= John Percy (metallurgist) =

English metallurgist (1817-1889)

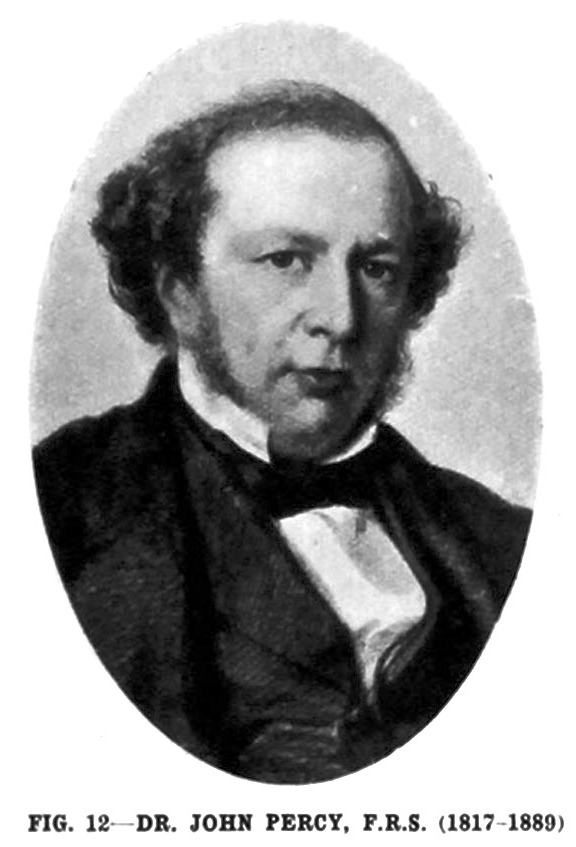
- John Percy (1817-1889)

John Percy FRS (23 March 1817 – 19 June 1889) was an English metallurgist.

== Life ==
The third son of Henry Percy, a solicitor, he was born at Nottingham on 23 March 1817. He went to a private school at Southampton, and then returned to Nottingham, where he attended chemical lectures by a Mr. Grisenthwaite at the local school of medicine. He wished to become a chemist; but his father's wish was that he should graduate in medicine, and in April 1834 he was taken by his brother Edmund to Paris to begin his medical studies. While in Paris he attended the lectures of Joseph Louis Gay-Lussac and Louis Jacques Thénard on chemistry, and of Antoine Laurent de Jussieu on botany.

In 1836 Percy went for a tour in Switzerland and the south of France, and made a collection of mineralogical and botanical specimens. He went on to Edinburgh, where he became a pupil of Sir Charles Bell and a friend of Edward Forbes. In 1838 he graduated M.D. in the university, and received a gold medal for a thesis on the presence of alcohol in the brain after poisoning by that substance. In 1839 he was elected physician to the Queen's Hospital, Birmingham, but, having private means, did not practise.

Local industry excited his interest in metallurgy. In 1846 he worked with David Forbes and William Hallowes Miller on crystallised slags. In 1847 he became a Fellow of the Royal Society, and served on the council from 1857 to 1859. In 1851 he was elected Fellow of the Geological Society, and was appointed lecturer on metallurgy at the newly founded Metropolitan School of Science in London, under Sir Henry Thomas de la Beche; the post was later made a professorship. Percy exerted influence, while holding this position, on metallurgy as a discipline, and through his pupils. The silver process was the only metallurgical one he actually invented, but his work suggested others; and the Gilchrist–Thomas process for making Bessemer steel from iron ores containing phosphorus was an outcome of his work, and was discovered by pupils.

In 1851 he undertook to superintend the analysis of a large number of specimens of iron and steel collected by his friend Samuel Holden Blackwell (which went to the Jermyn Street Museum). His results were an early attempt at a survey of national resources of iron ore.

Percy was appointed lecturer on metallurgy to the artillery officers at Woolwich, around 1864, and retained this post till his death. He was appointed superintendent of ventilation, etc., of the Houses of Parliament on 6 February 1865. He was also a member of the Secretary for War's commissions on the application of iron for defensive purposes (1861), and on "Gibraltar" shields (1867), and of the royal commissions on coal (1871), and on the spontaneous combustion of coal in ships (1875). In 1876 he was awarded the Bessemer medal of the Iron and Steel Institute, of which he was president during 1885 and 1886. In December 1879 the government decided to complete the removal of the Royal School of Mines from the Museum of Practical Geology in Jermyn Street to South Kensington. Objecting strongly, Percy twice offered to rebuild the metallurgical laboratory in Jermyn Street; but his offer was refused, and in December 1879 he resigned. Percy circulated a pamphlet containing his views on the subject In 1887 he was awarded the Millar prize of the Institute of Civil Engineers.

In 1889 Percy received the Albert Medal of the Society of Arts on his deathbed, with the words, "My work is done". He died on 19 June 1889. He had married, in 1839, Grace, daughter of John Piercy of Warley Hall, near Birmingham; she died in 1880.

Percy frequented the Athenæum Club and Garrick Club, and wrote letters to The Times, under the signature "Y"; and he denounced the Home Rule movement in his presidential address to the Iron and Steel Institute in 1886. His collection of water-colour drawings and engravings was dispersed by sale in 1890; the manuscript catalogue of the water-colour drawings was bought by the British Museum. Percy's collection of metallurgical specimens went to the South Kensington Museum.

He is buried at Kensal Green Cemetery in London, UK.

== Works ==
- Experiments [on] the Presence of Alcohol in the Ventricles of the Brain after Poisoning by that Liquid [1839].
- On the Importance of Special Scientific Knowledge to the Practical Metallurgist (government publication), 1852.
- On the Metallurgical Treatment and Assaying of Gold Ores, 1852; 2nd edition, 1853.
- A Treatise on Metallurgy, including vol. i. On Fuel, Copper, Zinc, and Brass; vol. ii. On Iron and Steel, 1864, 2nd edition 1875; vol. iii. On Lead, 1870; and vol. iv. On Silver and Gold, 1880. His 1851 survey resulted were embodied in the volume on Iron and Steel. This treatise was the first work of its kind written in modern times. It remained uncompleted, but contained over 3,500 terse pages of describing metallurgical processes, discussion of the chemical problems they involve, often based on the author's original research, and of suggestions for future investigation. The book was translated into French and German, and became a classic. It included work on alloys, Percy's discovery of aluminium bronze, and his view that in many places the Iron Age preceded the Bronze Age.
- On the Manufacture of Russian Sheet-Iron, 1871.

The Royal Society's Catalogue (vols. iv. viii. and x.) listed 21 papers published by Percy singly, one with W. H. Miller, and one with R. Smith. Besides these he published two presidential addresses to the Iron and Steel Institute in their Journal (1885, i. 8, and 1886, i. 29), and an article On Steel Wire of High Tenacity (1886, i. 162). In 1848 he contributed a paper to The Chemist (vol. i. p. 248) on a mode of extracting silver from its ores (depending on the solubility of the chloride in sodium thiosulphate), led to the Von Patera process, used at Joachimsthal, and the Russell process, used in the western United States.
