= Zarine Kharas =

British businesswoman, co-founder of Justgiving (born 1951)

Dame Zarine Kharas DBE
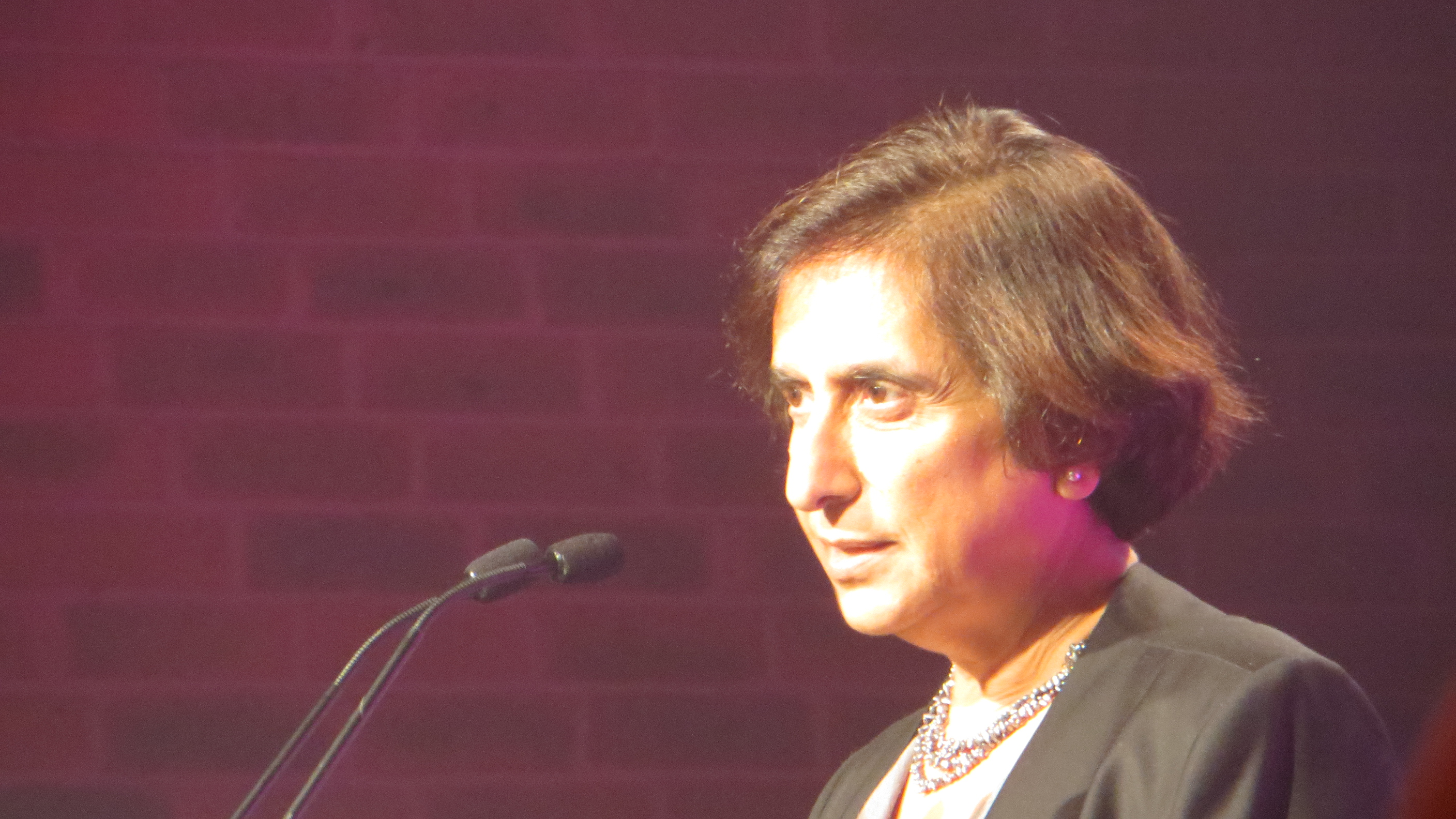
- Zarine Kharas at JustGiving Awards 2016
- Born: June 1951 (age 74); Karachi, Pakistan
- Education: University of Cambridge
- Occupations: Co-founder, Justgiving

Dame Zarine Kharas DBE (born June 1951) is a British businesswoman, and the co-founder, with Anne-Marie Huby and Uday Khemka, of Justgiving, an online giving platform.

== Biography ==
Kharas was born on 14 June 1951, in a Parsi family and grew up in Karachi, Pakistan, the daughter of a civil engineer father, Cursetjee and mother, Parin Kharas. She attended Karachi Grammar, Pakistan then went to the UK, in the late 1970's to study law at Girton College, Cambridge.

She graduated with a BA (Hons) in Law and began work for Lawrence Graham and Linklaters & Paines, both solicitor firms specialising in corporate and financial law. She then joined Credit Suisse First Boston (CSFB). When the head of CSFB, Hans-Joerg Rudloff, left to start his own investment banking operation, MC Securities, she followed him, becoming responsible for strategy and operations in Warsaw. Later she went back to her law firm roots, working with Simmons & Simmons.

She lives in Maida Vale, London

== Just Giving ==
In 1999, she began her idea of a charity fundraising platform run by a profit-making company. Kharas met Anne-Marie Huby at Médecins Sans Frontières in 2000 where they discussed the concept, Huby left her post and the pair then set up JustGiving and launched the website in February 2001. In October 2017, Justgiving was bought by Blackbaud. When Blackbaud took over the company, Kharas left the company.

== Honours ==
In 2009 she was awarded the Royal Society of Arts Albert Medal for “democratising fundraising and technology for charities.” In 2015, she was made a Dame Commander of the Order of the British Empire.
