= Albert Medal (Royal Society of Arts) =

- Awarded for: Achievements in the arts
- Country: United Kingdom
- Presented by: Royal Society of Arts
- First award: 1864
- Website: thersa.org

The Albert Medal of the Royal Society of Arts (RSA) was instituted in 1864 as a memorial to Prince Albert, who had been President of the Society for 18 years. It was first awarded in 1864 for "distinguished merit in promoting Arts, Manufactures and Commerce". In presenting the Medal, the Society now looks to acknowledge individuals, organizations and groups that lead progress and create positive change within contemporary society in areas that are linked closely to the Society's broad agenda.

Through the Albert Medal, the Society acknowledges the creativity and innovation of those that work to tackle some of the world's intractable problems. Each year, the RSA identifies issues by asking the Society's Fellowship to suggest problems and subjects linked to the Society's programme. These proposals are reviewed and recommendations made to the Trustees and Council, who are responsible for selecting one upon which the Fellowship will be asked to nominate worthy recipients.

== Full list of medalists ==
- 1864: Sir Rowland Hill KCB FRS 'for his great services to Arts, Manufactures and Commerce, in the creation of the penny postage, and for his other reforms in the postal system of this country, the benefits of which have, however, not been confined to this country, but have extended over the civilised world'
- 1865: The Emperor of the French (Napoleon III) 'for distinguished merit in promoting, in many ways, by his personal exertions, the international progress of Arts, Manufactures and Commerce, the proofs of which are afforded by his judicious patronage of Art, his enlightened commercial policy, and especially by the abolition of passports in favour of British subjects'
- 1866: Michael Faraday DCL FRS 'for his discoveries in electricity, magnetism, and chemistry, which in their relation to the industries of the world have so largely promoted Arts, Manufactures, and Commerce'
- 1867: William Fothergill Cooke and Charles Wheatstone FRS 'in recognition of their joint labours in establishing the first electric telegraphy'
- 1868: Joseph Whitworth LLD FRS 'for the invention and manufacture of instruments of measurement and uniform standards by which the production of machinery has been brought to a state of perfection hitherto unapproached to the great advancement of Arts, Manufactures and Commerce'
- 1869: Baron Justus von Liebig Associate of the Institute of France ForMembRS Chevalier of the Legion of Honour etc. 'for his numerous valuable researchers and writings, which have contributed most importantly to the development of food economy and agriculture, to the advancement of chemical science, and to the benefits derived from that science by Arts, Manufactures and Commerce'
- 1870: Ferdinand, Viscount de Lesseps Member of Institute of France HonGCSI 'for services rendered to Arts, Manufactures and Commerce, by the realisation of Suez Canal'.
- 1871: Henry Cole 'for his important services in promoting Arts, Manufactures and Commerce, especially in aiding the establishment and development of International Exhibitions, the Department of Science and Art, and the South Kensington Museum'
- 1872: Henry Bessemer FRS 'for the eminent services rendered by him to Arts, Manufactures and Commerce, in developing the manufacture of steel
- 1873: Michel Eugène Chevreul ForMembRS Member of the Institute of France 'for his chemical researches, especially in reference to saponification, dyeing, agriculture, and natural history, which for more than half a century have exercised a wide influence on the industrial arts of the world'
- 1874: Carl Wilhelm Siemens DCL FRS 'for his researches in connection with the laws of heat, and the practical applications of them to furnaces used in the Arts; and for his improvements in the manufacture of iron; and generally for the services rendered by him in connection with the economisation of fuel in its various applications to Manufactures and the Arts'
- 1875: Michel Chevalier 'the distinguished French statesman, who, by his writings and persistent exertions, extending over many years, has rendered essential services in promoting Arts, Manufactures and Commerce'
- 1876: Sir George Biddell Airy KCB FRS, Astronomer Royal 'for eminent services rendered to Commerce by his researches in nautical astronomy and in magnetism, and by his improvements in the application of the mariner's compass to the navigation of iron ships
- 1877: Jean-Baptiste Dumas ForMembRS Member of the Institute of France 'the distinguished chemist, whose researchers have excised a very material influence on the advancement of the Industrial Arts'
- 1878: William Armstrong (later The Lord Armstrong) CB DCL FRS 'because of his distinction as an engineer and as a scientific man, and because by the development of the transmission of power – hydraulically – due to his constant efforts, extending over many years, the manufactures of this country have been greatly aided, and mechanical power beneficially substituted for most laborious and injurious manual labour'
- 1879: William Thomson (later The Lord Kelvin) OM LLD DCL FRS 'on account of the signal service rendered to Arts, Manufactures and Commerce, by his electrical researches, especially with reference to the transmission of telegraphic messages over ocean cables'
- 1880: James Prescott Joule LLD DCL FRS 'for having established, after most laborious research, the true relation between heat, electricity and mechanical work, thus affording to the engineer a sure guide in the application of science to industrial pursuits'
- 1881: August Wilhelm von Hofmann MD LLD FRS, Professor of Chemistry in the University of Berlin 'for eminent services rendered to the Industrial Arts by his investigations in organic chemistry, and for his successful labour in promoting the cultivation of chemical education and research in England'
- 1882: Louis Pasteur Member of the Institute of France ForMembRS 'for his researches in connection with fermentation, the preservation of wines, and the propagation of zymotic diseases in silkworms and domestic animals, whereby the arts of wine making, silk production and agriculture have been greatly benefited'
- 1883: Sir Joseph Dalton Hooker KCSI CB MD DCL LLD FRS 'for the eminent services which, as a botanist and scientific traveller, and as Director of the National Botanical Department, he has rendered to the Arts, Manufactures and Commerce by promoting an accurate knowledge of the floras and economic vegetable products of our several colonies and dependencies of the Empire'
- 1884: Captain James Buchanan Eads 'the distinguished American engineer, whose works have been of such great service in improving the water communications of North America, and have thereby rendered valuable aid to the commerce of the world'
- 1885: Henry Doulton 'in recognition of the impulse given by him to the production of artistic pottery in this country'
- 1886: Samuel Lister (later The Lord Masham) 'for the services he has rendered to the textile industries, especially by the substitution of mechanical wool combing for hand combing, and by the introduction and development of a new industry – the utilisation of waste silk'
- 1887: The Queen (Queen Victoria) 'in commemoration of the progress of Arts, Manufactures and Commerce throughout the Empire during the fifty years of her reign'
- 1888: Professor Hermann von Helmholtz ForMembRS 'in recognition of the value of his researches in various branches of science and of their practical results upon music, painting and the useful arts'
- 1889: John Percy LLD FRS 'for his achievements in promoting the Arts, Manufactures and Commerce, though the worldwide influence which his researches and writings have had upon the progress of the science and practice of metallurgy'
- 1890: William Henry Perkin FRS 'for his discovery of the method of obtaining colouring matter from coal tar, a discovery which led to the establishment of a new and important industry, and to the utilisation of large quantities of a previously worthless material'
- 1891: Sir Frederick Abel Kt KCB DCL DSc FRS 'in recognition of the manner in which he has promoted several important classes of the Arts and Manufactures by the application of Chemical Science, and especially by his researches in the manufacture of iron and of steel, and also in acknowledgement of the great services he has rendered to the State in the provision of improved war material, and as Chemist to the War Department'
- 1892: Thomas Edison 'in recognition of the merits of his numerous and valuable inventions, especially his improvements in telegraphy, in telephony, and in electric lighting, and for his discovery of a means of reproducing vocal sounds by the phonograph'
- 1893: Sir John Bennet Lawes Bt FRS and Sir Henry Gilbert PhD FRS 'for their joint services to scientific agriculture, and notably for the researches which, throughout a period of fifty years, have been carried on by them at the Experimental Farm, Rothamsted'
- 1894: Sir Joseph Lister Bt FRS 'for the discovery and establishment of the antiseptic method of treating wounds and injuries by which not only has the art of surgery been greatly promoted, and human life saved in all parts of the world, but extensive industries have been created for the supply of materials required for carrying the treatment into effect.'
- 1895: Sir Lowthian Bell Bt FRS 'in recognition of the services he has rendered to Arts, Manufactures and Commerce, by his metallurgical researches and the resulting development of the iron and steel industries'
- 1896: Professor David Edward Hughes FRS 'in recognition of the services he has rendered to Arts, Manufactures and Commerce, by his numerous inventions in electricity and magnetism, especially the printing telegraph and the microphone'
- 1897: George James Symons FRS 'for the services he has rendered to the United Kingdom by affording to engineers engaged in the water supply and the sewage of towns, a trustworthy basis for their work, by establishing and carrying on during nearly forty years systematic observations (now at over 3000 stations) of the rainfall of the British Isles, and by recording, tabulating and graphically indicating the results of these observations in the annual volumes published by himself'
- 1898: Professor Robert Bunsen MD ForMembRS 'in recognition of his numerous and most valuable applications of Chemistry and Physics to the Arts and Manufactures'
- 1899: Sir William Crookes FRS 'for his extensive and laborious researches in chemistry and in physics, researches which have in many instances developed into useful practical applications in the Arts and Manufactures'
- 1900: Henry Wilde FRS 'for the discovery and practical demonstration of the indefinite increase of the magnetic and electric forces from quantities indefinitely small, a discovery now used in all dynamo machines; and for its application to the production of the electric search-light, and to the electro-deposition of metals from their solutions'
- 1901: The King (Edward VII) 'in recognition of the aid rendered by His Majesty to Arts, Manufactures and Commerce, during thirty-eight years' presidency of the Society of Arts, by undertaking the direction of important exhibitions in this country and the executive control of British representation at International Exhibitions abroad, and also by many other services to the cause of British Industry'
- 1902: Professor Alexander Graham Bell 'for his invention of the Telephone'
- 1903: Sir Charles Augustus Hartley Kt KCMG 'in recognition of his services, extending over forty-four years, as Engineer to the International Commission of the Danube, which have resulted in the opening up of the navigation of that river to ships of all nations, and of his similar services, extending over twenty years, as British Commissioner on the International Technical Commission of the Suez Canal'
- 1904: Walter Crane 'in recognition of the services he has rendered to Art and Industry by awakening popular interest in Decorative Art and Craftsmanship, and by promoting the recognition of English Art in the form most material to the commercial prosperity of the country'
- 1905: The Lord Rayleigh OM DCL ScD FRS 'in recognition of the influence which his researches, directed to the increase of scientific knowledge, have had upon industrial progress, by facilitating amongst other scientific applications, the provision of accurate electrical standards, the production of improved lenses and the development of apparatus for Sound Signaling at Sea'
- 1906: Sir Joseph Swan MA DSc FRS 'for the important part he took in the invention of the incandescent electric lamp, and for his invention of the carbon process of photographic printing'
- 1907: The Earl of Cromer GCB OM GCMG KCSI CIE PC FRS 'in recognition of his pre-eminent public services in Egypt, where he has 'imparted security to the relations of this country with the East, has established justice, restored order and prosperity, and, by the initiation of great works, has opened up new fields for enterprise'
- 1908: Sir James Dewar MA DSc LLD FRS 'for his investigations into the liquefaction of gases and the properties of matter at low temperatures, investigations which have resulted in the production of the lowest temperatures yet reached, the use of vacuum vessels for thermal isolation, and the application of cooled charcoal to the separation of gaseous mixtures and to the production of high vacua'
- 1909: Sir Andrew Noble Bt KCB DSc DCL FRS 'in recognition of his long-continued and valuable researches into the nature and action of explosives, which have resulted in the greater development and improvement of modern ordnance'
- 1910: Marie Curie 'for the discovery of Radium'
- 1911: The Hon Sir Charles Algernon Parsons KCB LLD DSc FRS 'for his experimental researches into the laws governing the efficient action of steam in engines of the turbine type, and for his invention of the reaction type of steam turbine, and its practical application to the generation of electricity and other purposes'
- 1912: The Lord Strathcona and Mount Royal GCMG GCVO LLD DCL FRS 'for his services in improving the railway communications, developing the resources, and promoting the commerce and industry of Canada and other parts of the British Empire'
- 1913: The King (George V) 'for nine years President, and now Patron of the Society, in respectful recognition of His Majesty's untiring efforts to make himself personally acquainted with the social and economic condition of the various parts of his Dominions, and to promote the progress of Arts, Manufactures and Commerce in the United Kingdom and throughout the British Empire'
- 1914: Chevalier Guglielmo Marconi LLD DSc 'for his services in the development and practical application of wireless telegraphy'
- 1915: Professor Sir J. J. Thomson OM DSc LLD FRS 'for his researches in physics and chemistry, and their application to the advancement of Arts, Manufactures and Commerce'
- 1916: Professor Élie Metchnikoff ForMemRS 'in recognition of the value of his investigations into the causes of immunity in infective diseases, which have led to important changes in medical practice, and to the establishment of principles certain to have a most beneficial influence on the improvement of public health'
- 1917: Orville Wright 'in recognition of the value of the contributions of Wilbur and Orville Wright to the solution of the problem of mechanical flight'
- 1918: Sir Richard Glazebrook CB ScD FRS 'for his services in the application of science to the industries of peace and war, by his work as Director of the National Physical Laboratory since 1899, and as Chairman of the Advisory Committee for Aeronautics'
- 1919: Sir Oliver Lodge DSc LLD FRS 'in recognition of his work as the pioneer of wireless telegraphy'
- 1920: Professor Albert Abraham Michelson 'whose optical inventions have rendered possible the reproduction of accurate metric standards, and have provided the means of carrying out measurements with a minute precision hitherto unobtainable'
- 1921: Professor John Ambrose Fleming FRS 'in recognition of his many valuable contributions to electrical science and its applications, and specially of his original invention of the thermionic valve, now so largely employed in wireless telegraphy and for other purposes'
- 1922: Sir Dugald Clerk KBE DSc LLD FRS 'in recognition of his important contributions, both theoretical and practical to the development of the internal combustion engine, who in its latter forms has rendered aerial navigation possible, and is also extensively employed in the motor car, and in the submarine and for many other purposes'
- 1923: Major-General Sir David Bruce Kt KCB DSc LLD FRCP FRS and Colonel Sir Ronald Ross KCB KCMG DSc LLD MD FRS FRCS 'in recognition of the eminent services they have rendered to the Economic Development of the World by their achievements in Biological Research and the Study of Tropical Diseases'
- 1924: The Prince of Wales (later Edward VIII) 'in recognition of Services rendered to the Arts, Manufactures and Commerce as President of the British Empire Exhibition, and by his visits to the Dominions and Colonies'
- 1925: Lieut-Colonel Sir David Prain CMG CIE ME LLD FRS 'for the application of Botany to the development of raw materials of the Empire'
- 1926: Professor Paul Sabatier Member of the Institute of France ForMembRS 'in recognition of his distinguished work in science and of the eminent services to industry rendered by his renowned researches in Physics and Chemistry, which laid the foundation of important industrial processes'
- 1927: Sir Aston Webb Kt GCVO CB PRA PRIBA FSA LLD 'for distinguished services to Architecture'
- 1928: Sir Ernest Rutherford OM LLD DSc FRS 'for his pioneer researches into the structure of matter'
- 1929: Sir James Alfred Ewing KCB LLD FRS 'for his work in magnetism and his services to technical education'
- 1930: Professor Henry Edward Armstrong LLD DSc FRS 'for his discoveries in Chemistry and his services to Education'
- 1931: The Duke of Connaught and Strathearn 'in grateful appreciation of his presidency of the Society since 1911'
- 1932: Frank Brangwyn RA 'for his services to decorative and commercial art'
- 1933: Sir William Llewellyn GCVO PRA 'for his encouragement of Art in Industry'
- 1934: Sir Frederick Gowland Hopkins LLD DSc PRS 'for his researches in Biochemistry and the Constituents of Foods'
- 1935: Sir Robert Hadfield Bt Kt DSc FRS 'for his researches in Metallurgy and his services to the Steel Industry'
- 1936: The Earl of Derby Bt KG GCB GCVO PC 'for the advancement of Commerce and Arts, especially in Lancashire'
- 1937: William Nuffield OBE 'for services to industry, transport and medical science'
- 1938: Queen Mary 'in recognition of Her Majesty's unremitting interest in arts and manufactures, to the great benefit of British industry and commerce'
- 1939: Sir Thomas Henry Holland KCSI KCIE DSc LLD FRS 'for services to the mineral industries'
- 1940: John Alexander Milne CBE 'for services to Industrial Art'
- 1941: President Franklin D. Roosevelt 'in recognition of his pre-eminent services to humanity as the fearless and resolute champion of the ideals of freedom and individual liberty'
- 1942: Field Marshal Rt Hon Jan Smuts OM CH FRS 'Statesman. Soldier. Scientist. Philosopher'
- 1943: Sir John Russell OBE DSc FRS 'for his researches and leadership in agricultural science and his services to husbandry in many lands'
- 1944: Sir Henry Tizard KCB DCL FRS 'for his achievements in applying scientific principles to aeronautics and his services to advanced Technical Education'
- 1945: Rt Hon Winston Churchill CH FRS MP 'whose foresight, faith and fortitude led free men to victory'
- 1946: Sir Alexander Fleming FRS and Sir Howard Florey FRS
- 1947: Sir Robert Robinson MA DSc LLD FRS 'for his outstanding contributions to the advancement of organic chemistry'
- 1948: Sir William Reid Dick KCVO RA 'for National Memories in Living Stone'
- 1949: Sir Giles Gilbert Scott OM 'Builder of a lasting heritage for Britain'
- 1950: Sir Edward Victor Appleton GBE KCB MA DSc ScD LLD FRS 'for outstanding services to science and industrial research'
- 1951: The King (George VI) 'in respectful recognition of His Majesty's lifelong concern for the progress of industry and for industrial welfare'
- 1952: Air Commodore Sir Frank Whittle KBE CB FRS 'for his development of the continuous-combustion gas turbine and jet propulsion'
- 1953: Dr Edgar Adrian OM MD PRS 'for his outstanding contribution to neuro-physiology'
- 1954: Sir Ambrose Heal 'for his services to industrial design'
- 1955: Dr Ralph Vaughan Williams OM 'for his eminent service to music'
- 1956: Sir Henry Hallett Dale OM GBE MD FRS 'for eminent service to science, particularly physiology'
- 1957: Sir Christopher Hinton Kt KBE FRS 'for his outstanding leadership in nuclear power development'
- 1958: The Queen (Elizabeth II) 'to mark Her Majesty's personal service to arts, manufactures and commerce, at home and abroad'
- 1959: Vincent Massey CH 'for his distinguished encouragement of the arts and sciences'
- 1960: Sir Frederick Handley Page CBE
- 1961: Professor Walter Gropius DrIng FIAA HonRDI 'for his contributions to architectural and industrial design'
- 1962: Sir Sydney Gordon Russell CBE MC RDI FSIA 'for his services to industrial design'
- 1963: The Duke of Edinburgh 'for distinguished merit in promoting arts, manufactures and commerce'
- 1964: Dame Ninette de Valois DBE 'for her services to the art of ballet'
- 1965: Sir Leon Bagrit 'for his work in the application of automation to industry'
- 1966: Christopher Cockerell CBE 'for his work in the invention and technical development of the hovercraft'
- 1967: Sir Edward Lewis 'for his contribution to the electronics industry'
- 1968: Sir Barnes Wallis 'in recognition of his contributions to the development of aeronautical science and engineering'
- 1969: Sir Allen Lane 'for his contribution to publishing and education'
- 1970: Peter Scott CBE 'for his work in the conservation of wild life'
- 1971: Sir William Glock CBE 'for his outstanding services to music'
- 1972: Sir George Edwards OM CBE FRS 'for services to aeronautical science and aviation'
- 1973: Sir John Betjeman CBE 'for his contribution to poetry and the appreciation of architecture'
- 1974: Queen Elizabeth the Queen Mother 'in recognition for Her Majesty's outstanding support and patronage of the arts, manufactures & commerce'
- 1975: Sir Nikolaus Pevsner CBE 'for his distinguished services to Britain's industrial heritage'
- 1976: The Lord Olivier (the actor Laurence Olivier) 'for his service to the Drama and the British Theatre'
- 1977: The Lord Robens of Woldingham PC 'for his contribution to industrial progress in Britain'
- 1978: Sir John Charnley 'for his contributions to orthopaedic surgery'
- 1979: Sir Robert Mayer CH 'for his services to music, and in particular his generous and practical encouragement of young musicians and of young people learning to appreciate music'
- 1980: The Baroness Jackson of Lodsworth (the economist Barbara Ward) 'for her work in the field of international co-operation in economic development'
- 1981: Yehudi Menuhin KBE 'for his contribution to music'
- 1982: Akio Morita 'for his contributions to technological and industrial innovation and management'
- 1983: Sir Arnold Alexander Hall 'for his outstanding contributions to the aeronautical industry, and in particular to aeronautical engineering'
- 1984: Sir Hugh Casson KCVO RIBA RDI 'for his contributions to art and design'
- 1985: The Prince of Wales 'for increasing recognition of the need for new – and often young – enterprise in industry, and for multiplying support, both corporate and private, for the arts'
- 1986: Sir Alastair Pilkington 'for his outstanding contribution to industrial innovation'
- 1987: Dr Francis Crick FRS 'for his contributions to molecular and cell biology'
- 1988: Sir Shridath Ramphal CMG QC 'for his outstanding contributions towards accord within the Commonwealth, and his promotion of the worldwide concept of or inseparable humanity'
- 1989: The Lord Sainsbury of Preston Candover 'for his outstanding contributions in the fields of business and the arts'
- 1990: Dr Jonathan Miller 'for his outstanding contribution he has made to both the arts and science and the way he has brought both to a larger audience'
- 1991: The Baroness Seear PC 'for her distinguished contribution to public life in the spheres of industrial relations and the development of the principles of human resources management in industry'
- 1992: The Lord Young of Dartington 'for his impact and achievement in a multiplicity of fields, especially education, consumer affairs and social services'
- 1993: Paul Hamlyn CBE 'for his contribution to the arts, manufactures and commerce as a businessman, publisher and philanthropist'
- 1994: Sir Ernest Hall OBE 'for his charitable enterprise founded on his achievements as a financial analyst'
- 1995: Sir Adrian Cadbury 'for his outstanding contribution to business and to corporate governance'
- 1996: Sir Claus Moser KCB CBE FBA 'for his contribution to social sciences and commitment to education, music and the arts'
- 1997: Sir Simon Rattle CBE 'for his outstanding contribution as a leading conductor and champion or orchestral involvement in a broad programme of education and community activity'
- 1998: The Baroness Warnock DBE 'in recognition of her national and international influence on the fields of education, ethics, human fertility, environmental issues and philosophy'
- 1999: Professor Stephen Hawking CH CBE FRS 'for making physics more accessible, understandable and exciting and opening the subject to a wider audience through his books and television programmes'
- 2000: The Princess Royal 'for her many years of enthusiastically promoting and encouraging arts, manufactures and commerce in her visit programme and her dedicated work for charities.
- 2001: Mary Robinson 'for her work as the main architect of the Global Compact on Corporate Social Responsibility.'
- 2002: Tim Berners-Lee OBE 'for his outstanding contribution to the World Wide Web.'
- 2003: Tim Smit CBE 'for developing the Eden Project which has broken new boundaries in tourism, ecology, education, enterprise and development partnership.'
- 2004: Karan Bilimoria CBE 'for meeting the RSA manifesto challenge to encourage enterprise'
- 2005: Dr Gro Harlem Brundtland 'for awaking the world to the environmental challenge'
- 2008: Dr Simon Duffy for social innovation
- 2009: Zarine Kharas, CEO of Justgiving 'for democratising fundraising'
- 2010: Jeremy Deller, contemporary visual artist 'for creating art that encourages public responses and creativity'.
- 2011: Albina Ruiz, of Ciudad Saludable, a sustainable development organisation based in Peru.
- 2013: Selwyn Image, of Emmaus UK, 'for setting up the UK branch of the international movement that gives homeless people a place to live and work.'
- 2014: Jos de Blok of Buurtzorg Nederland, for 'a transformational new model of community health care.'
- 2015: James Timpson OBE, of Timpson, 'for successfully uniting the commercial and social benefit aspects of business'
- 2016: Peter Tatchell, human rights campaigner for 'tireless campaigning on human rights & social equality'
- 2017: Robin Murray (posthumous), 'for pioneering work in social innovation'
- 2018: Neil Jameson of Citizens UK, 'for services to community organising for the common good'
- 2019: Paul Sinton-Hewitt CBE of parkrun, 'for building a global participation movement'
- 2021: Prof Dame Sarah Gilbert of University of Oxford for 'collaborative innovation for the global common good'
- 2022: Andrew Mawson and Sam Everington for their work on how local healthcare services support patients
- 2023: Christiana Figueres for creative leadership in the fields of nature and climate action.
