= Albert Medal =

Albert Medal may refer to:

- Albert Medal for Lifesaving, awarded for lifesaving
- Albert Medal (Royal Society of Arts), awarded by the Royal Society of Arts
