= Camden Square =

Town square in the London Borough of Camden

Coordinates: 51°32′42″N 0°7′55″W

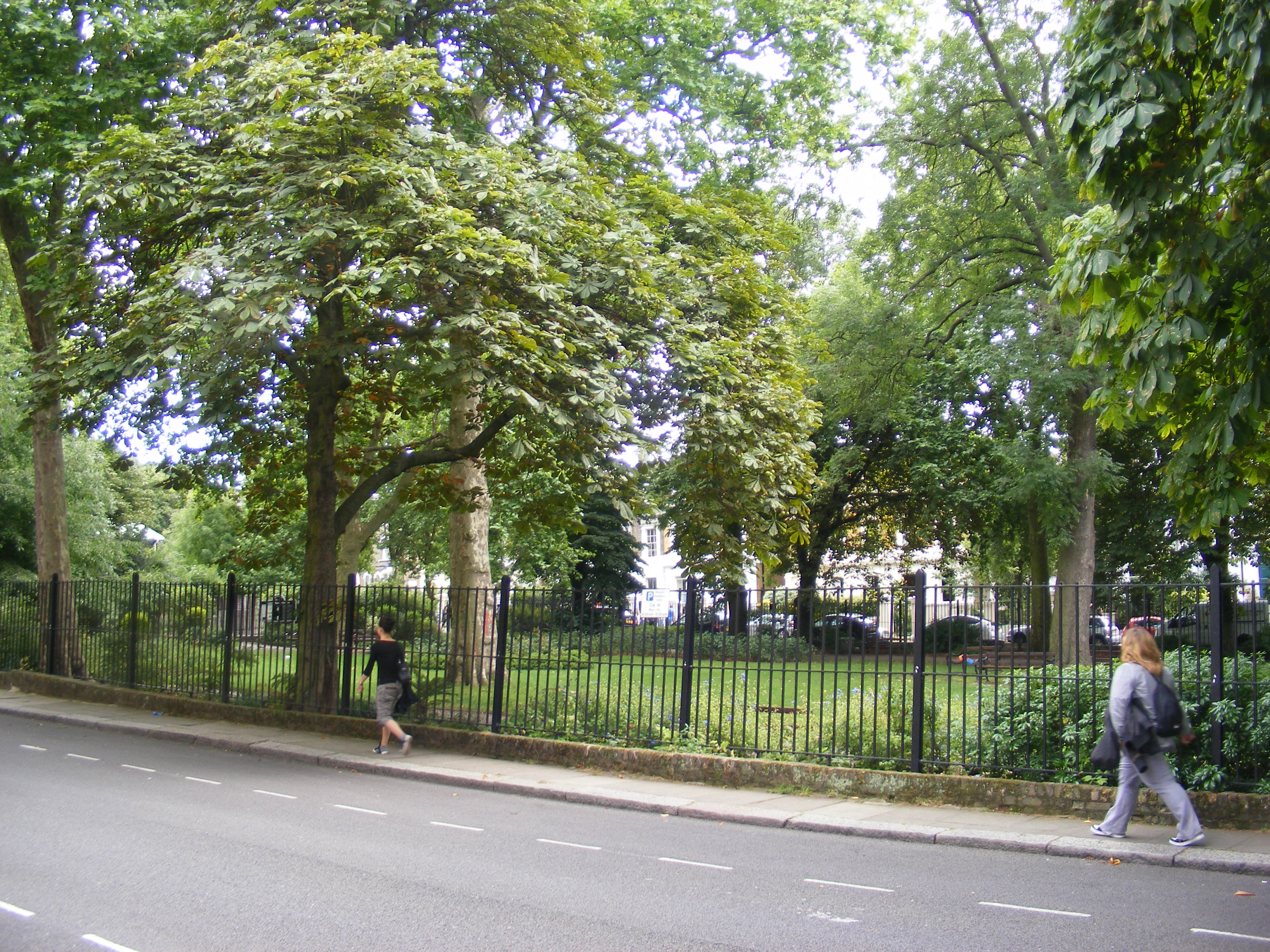
Camden Square

Camden Square is a rectangular town square in the London Borough of Camden running parallel to Camden Road north of central Camden. It has a playground and dog-walking area, and St Paul's Church is at the north end. It has a perimeter of 200 metres (660 ft). At the south end is the London Irish Centre, which has served the borough's Irish community for over sixty years. The square and adjacent mews form part of the Camden Square Conservation Area. Notable residents include the artist Lawrence Alma-Tadema, the sculptors Henry Hugh Armstead and William Turnbull, the meteorologist George James Symons, the Indian politician V. K. Krishna Menon and the singer Amy Winehouse.

== History ==
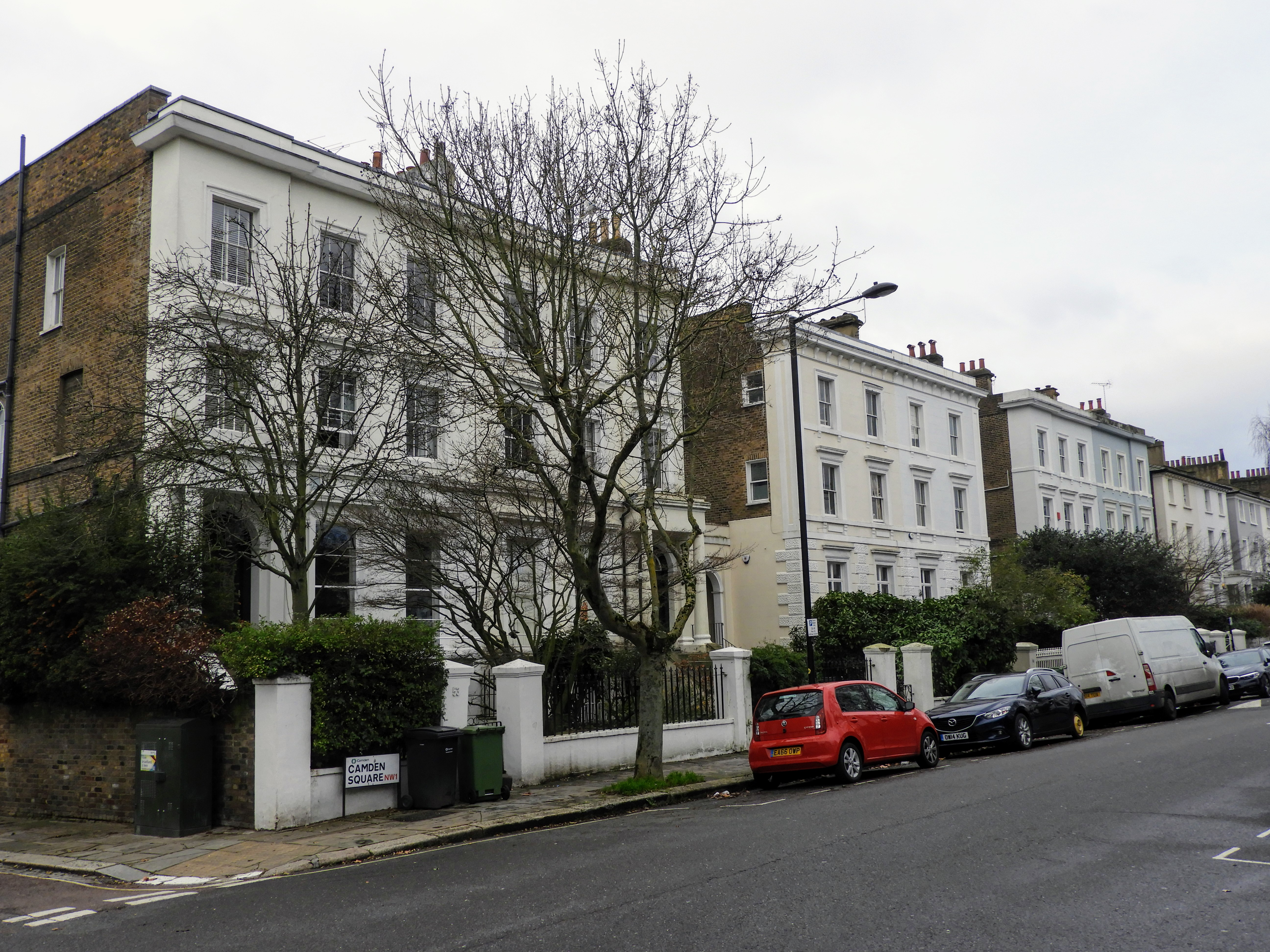
53–64 Camden Square

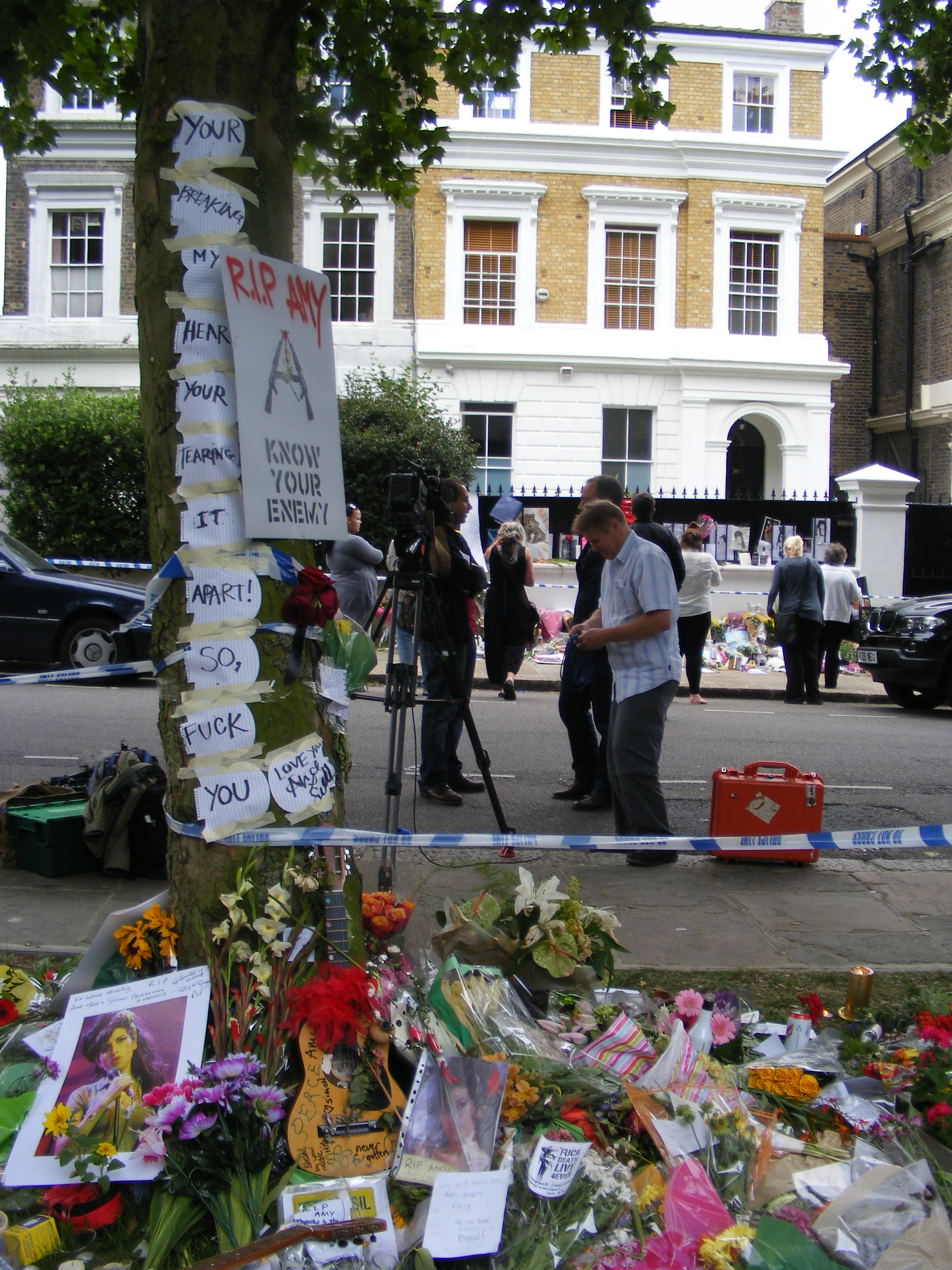
Amy Winehouse's home, and the tributes outside, in 2011

The square was developed from around 1845 to 1871, with St Paul's Church, by Frederick Webster Ordish and John Johnson, being started in 1847 and consecrated in 1849. The gardens were completed before the surrounding housing. Railway tunnelling under the square resulted in the demolition of some buildings during the 1860s and again in 1898. In the Second World War, the original railings surrounding the garden were removed and the square was severely damaged by bombing in 1940–41. St Paul's Church was particularly badly affected, and the original church building was demolished in 1956. The London Irish Centre was founded in 1955 and an adventure playground was built by the council in the gardens in the 1950s.

== Architecture ==
The majority of the square's architecture is Victorian. The building on the south-west corner has Corinthian pilasters; the villas on the eastern side are less decorated, but have arched tops to their windows. A substantial modern house at no. 66 by Peter Bell (1984–85) features "delicate timberwork". Starting in the 1960s, several houses in the adjacent mews were designed by architects for themselves, including houses by Ted Cullinan, Team 4, Richard Gibson and Tom Kay.

== Notable residents ==
Many artists have lived in the square. The most notable are probably Sir Lawrence Alma-Tadema OM, RA, who lived briefly at no. 4 in 1871, and the sculptors Henry Hugh Armstead and William Turnbull. For the period 1851 to 1901 seventy-five artists have been identified living in the square or nearby. The woodcut engraver Orlando Jewitt lived and died on the square. Another resident during the Victorian era was the meteorologist George James Symons, who lived at no. 62 in 1868–1900, and documented the weather there every day.

One of its houses once housed the West African Students' Union. Indian politician V. K. Krishna Menon lived at no. 57 from 1924 to 1947.

Amy Winehouse lived at no. 30 on the square, where she died in 2011. The following year, her house was put on the market for £2.7 million by her family. At that date there were tributes from fans around the trees and the fence to the gardens opposite the house. In the years since her death, at least fourteen 'Camden Square' street signs have been stolen by fans seeking memorabilia, which has cost Camden Borough Council over £4000 to replace.
