= Anne-Marie Huby =

Belgian businesswoman (born 1966)

- Born: Anne-Marie Paule Monique Huby; November 1966 (age 59); Belgium
- Occupations: Co-founder and MD of Justgiving

Anne-Marie Paule Monique Huby (born 17 November 1966) is a Belgian businesswoman, the co-founder, with Zarine Kharas, of Justgiving, a global online giving platform.

Beginning her career as a radio presenter, Huby had senior roles in Médecins Sans Frontières before co-founding JustGiving. She remained as chief executive until the company was purchased by Blackbaud.

Huby is now chair of My Tutor, Green Conservation and a trustee of the Anna Freud Centre.

== Career ==
Huby attended Athénée Royal de Malmedy school in Belgium followed by the Institut des Hautes Etudes des Communications Sociales in Brussels. She started her career as a radio journalist in Belgium in the 1980s, there she presented a current affairs show every day for a national audience. After a year, she took a job in the UK at the Birmingham Post. She studied English at Birkbeck, University of London while teaching French part time. Age 24, she founded a press office for the charity Médecins Sans Frontières in Zagreb, Croatia where she remained between 1991 and 1993 before moving on to become head of the UK arm of Médecins Sans Frontières. While at Medecins Sans Frontieres (UK) she worked providing medical facilities in countries such as former Yugoslavia and Rwanda.

Huby met Kharas at Médecins Sans Frontières in 2000 where they discussed the Justgiving concept which led to Huby leaving the organisation to start up the company and launch the website in February 2001. In October 2017, Justgiving was bought by Blackbaud. When Blackbaud took over the company, Huby stepped down as Chief Executive and took on the role as an executive on Blackbaud’s consumer business steering committee.

Living in Islington, Huby is the chair of an education business, MyTutor. She is also co-chair of Green Conservation, a group trying to change the laws regarding Grade II listed properties in conservation areas, to enable owners to make them more eco-friendly and energy efficient. Huby is also a trustee of the Anna Freud Centre.
