= George James Symons =

British meteorologist

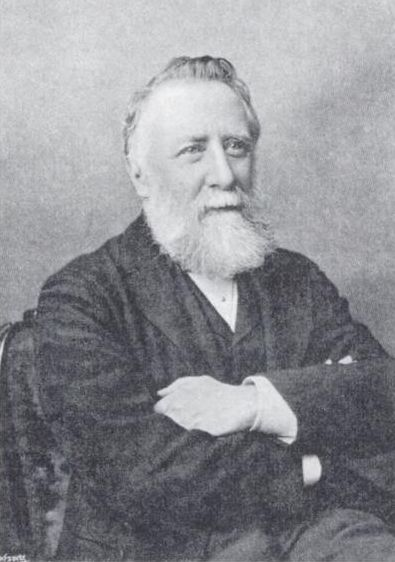
- George James Symons
- Born: 6 August 1838; London
- Died: 10 March 1900 (aged 61); London
- Awards: Albert Medal (1897)
- Scientific career
- Fields: Meteorology

George James Symons FRS (6 August 1838 – 10 March 1900) was a British meteorologist who founded and managed the British Rainfall Organisation, an unusually dense and widely distributed network of rainfall data collection sites throughout the British Isles.

== Life ==
He was the only child of Joseph Symons by his wife, Georgina Moon. He was born at Queen's Row, Pimlico, on 6 August 1838. His education, begun at St Peter's collegiate school, Eaton Square, was completed under private tuition at Thornton rectory, Leicestershire. He subsequently passed with distinction through the course at the Royal School of Mines, Jermyn Street.

From boyhood, he made observations on the weather with instruments of his own construction, and at the age of seventeen became a member of the Royal Meteorological Society. From 1863, he sat on the council, acted as secretary 1873-1879 and 1882–1899, and was elected president in 1880 and again in 1900. In 1857, he undertook, and continued to discharge until his death, the duties of meteorological reporter to the registrar-general, and was appointed by Robert FitzRoy in 1860 to a post in the meteorological department of the board of trade, which he held for three years. He resigned it owing to the growing exigencies of his rainfall observations. The first of a series of thirty-nine annual volumes containing statistics on the subject was published by him in 1860; it included records from 168 stations in England and Wales. In 1898, the number of stations had grown to 3,404, of which 436 were in Scotland and 186 in Ireland, and they were manned by an army of over three thousand volunteer observers. This unique organisation was kept by Symons under close personal supervision, and the upshot was the accumulation of a mass of data of standard value, unmatched in any other country. The sanitary importance of water-supply was a determining motive for its collection.

Symons began, in 1863, the issue of a monthly rain-circular, which developed in 1866 into the Monthly Meteorological Magazine,. He was a prominent member of various committees appointed by the British Association, and as secretary to the conference on lightning rods in 1878 shared largely in the four years' task of compiling its report. Elected in 1878 a fellow of the Royal Society, he acted as chairman of the committee on the eruption of Krakatoa in 1883, and edited the voluminous report published in 1888.

He sat on the council of the Social Science Association in 1878, and on the jury of the Health Exhibition in 1884; was registrar to the Sanitary Institute from 1880 to 1895, and drew up a report on the 1884 Colchester earthquake for the Mansion House committee. In 1876, he received the Telford premium of the Institution of Civil Engineers for a paper on Floods and Water Economy, and in 1897 the Albert medal of the Society of Arts for the 'services rendered to the United Kingdom' by his rainfall observations.

He was a member of the Scottish and Australasian Meteorological Societies, of the Royal Botanic Society, and of many foreign learned associations. Twice elected to the council of the Societe Météorologique de France, he frequently attended its meetings at Paris, and was made, in 1891, a chevalier of the Legion of Honour.

Struck with paralysis on 14 February, he died on 10 March 1900, and was buried in Kensal Green cemetery.

== Family ==
He married in 1866 Elizabeth Luke, who shared his labours until her death in 1884. Their only child died in infancy.

== Legacy ==
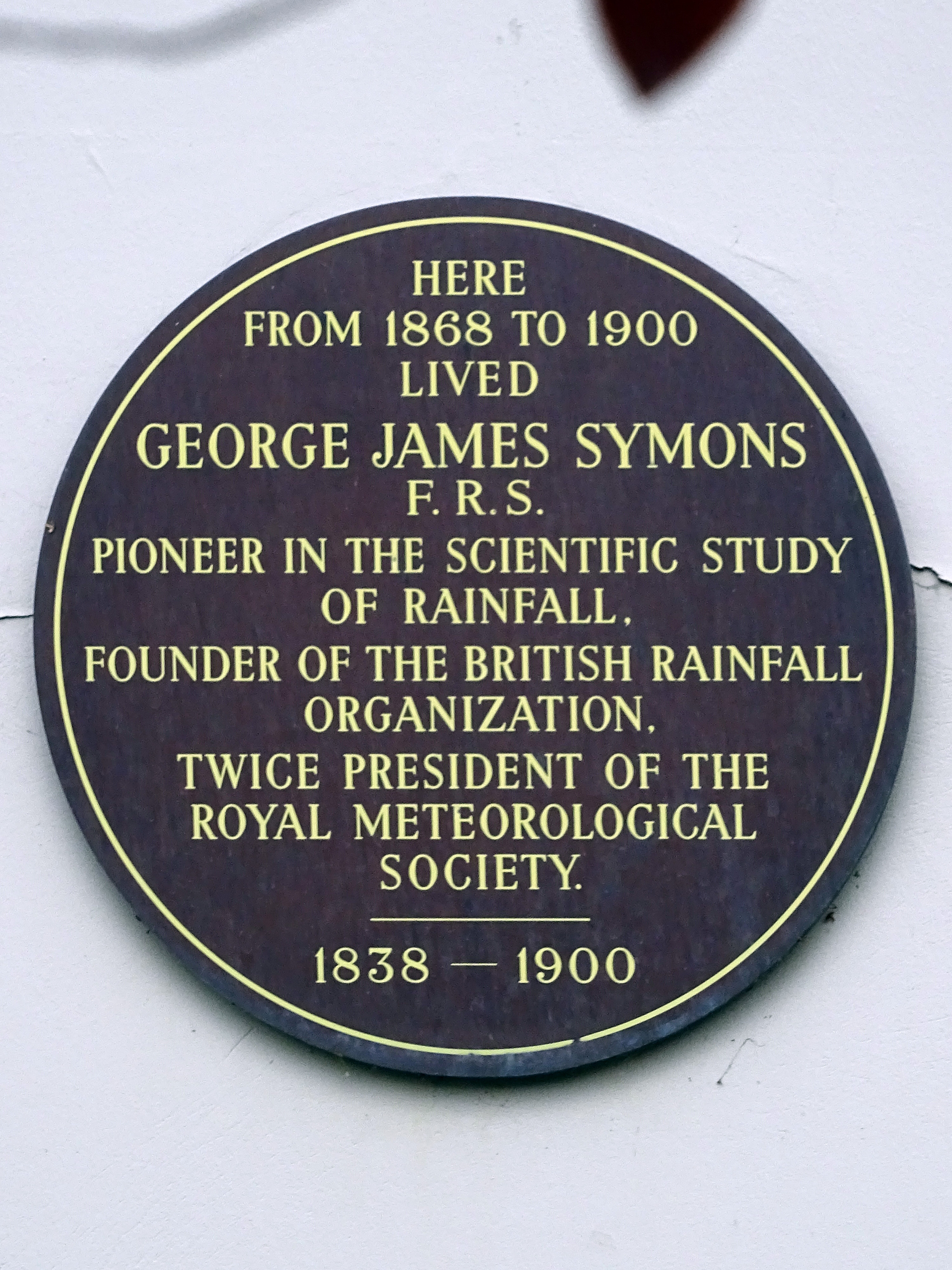
Commemorative plaque on Symons' house in Camden Square, London

An obituary was included in Symons British Rainfall 1899. His work on rainfall was continued by H. Sowerby Wallis, his coadjutor during thirty years. Retitled from British Rainfall 1900, annual editions were published until 1968.

A paper on The Wiltshire Whirlwind of October 1, 1889, prepared by Symons a few days before his last illness, was read to the Royal Meteorological Society on 16 May 1900. A gold medal (Symons Gold Medal) in his memory was founded by the same body, to be awarded for services to meteorological science. The record of weather kept by Symons at his house in Camden Square was maintained unbroken for forty-two years.

== Works ==
His library contained ten thousand volumes and pamphlets. Besides essays and reports, he wrote:

- Rain: how, when, where, why it is measured, London, 1867.
- Pocket Altitude Tables, London, 1876, &c., three editions.
- The Floating Island in Derwentwater, London, 1889.
- Merle's MS. Consideraciones Temperiei pro 7 Annis 1337-1344, reproduced under his supervision, London, 1891.
- Theophrastus on Winds and Weather Signs, edited from John George Wood's translation, London, 1894. Mr. Benjamin Daydon Jackson's 'Vegetable Technology,' London, 1882, was based upon a catalogue of works on applied botany published by Symons in the Colonies and India for 13 September 1879. A report drawn up by him in 1861 on the anemometry of Bermuda appeared in the eighth number of the meteorological papers issued by the board of trade.
