= Tolar =

Bohemian silver coin (1520–1672)

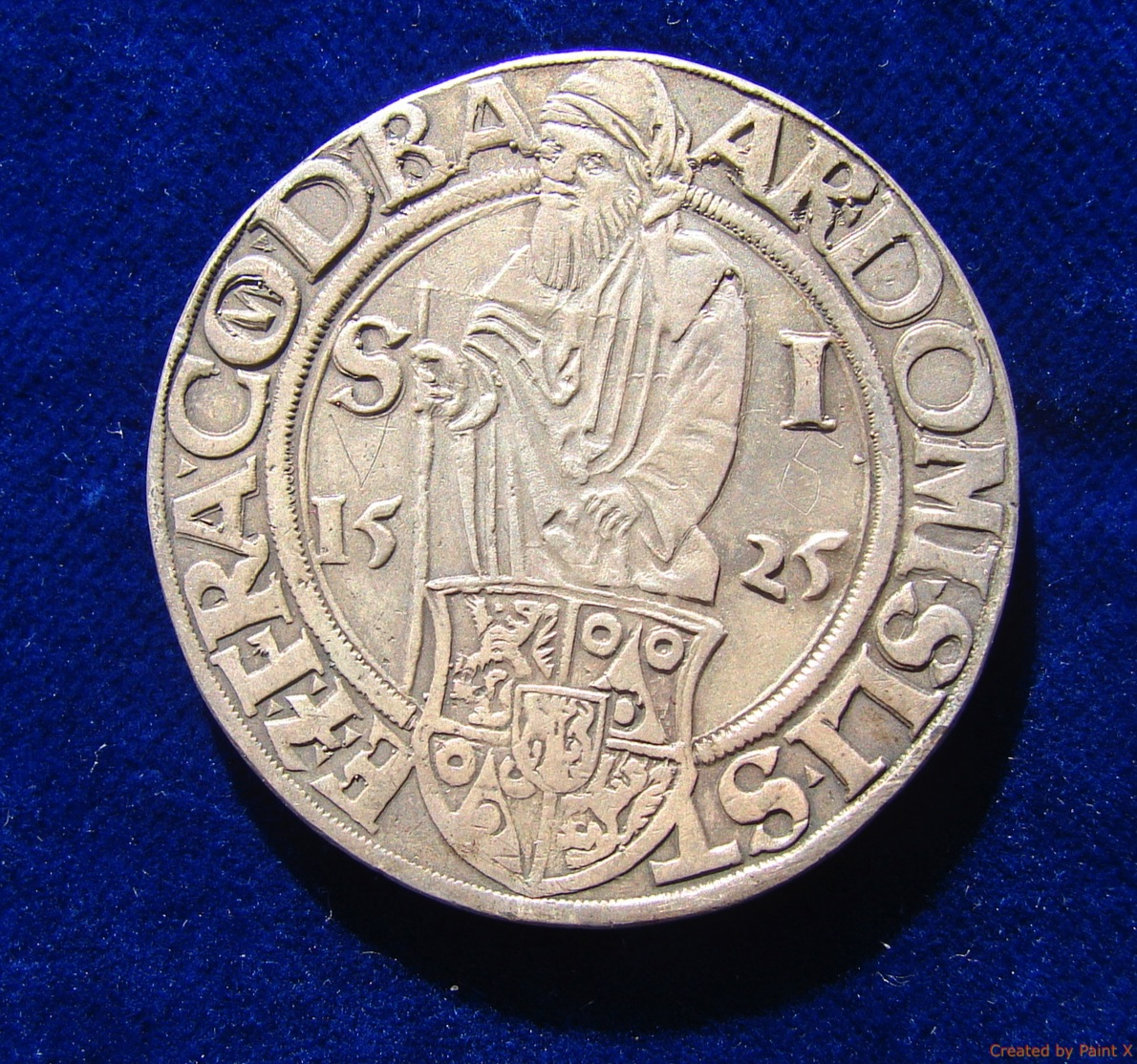
Bohemia, Joachimsthaler 1525. Obverse, picturing St. Joachim.

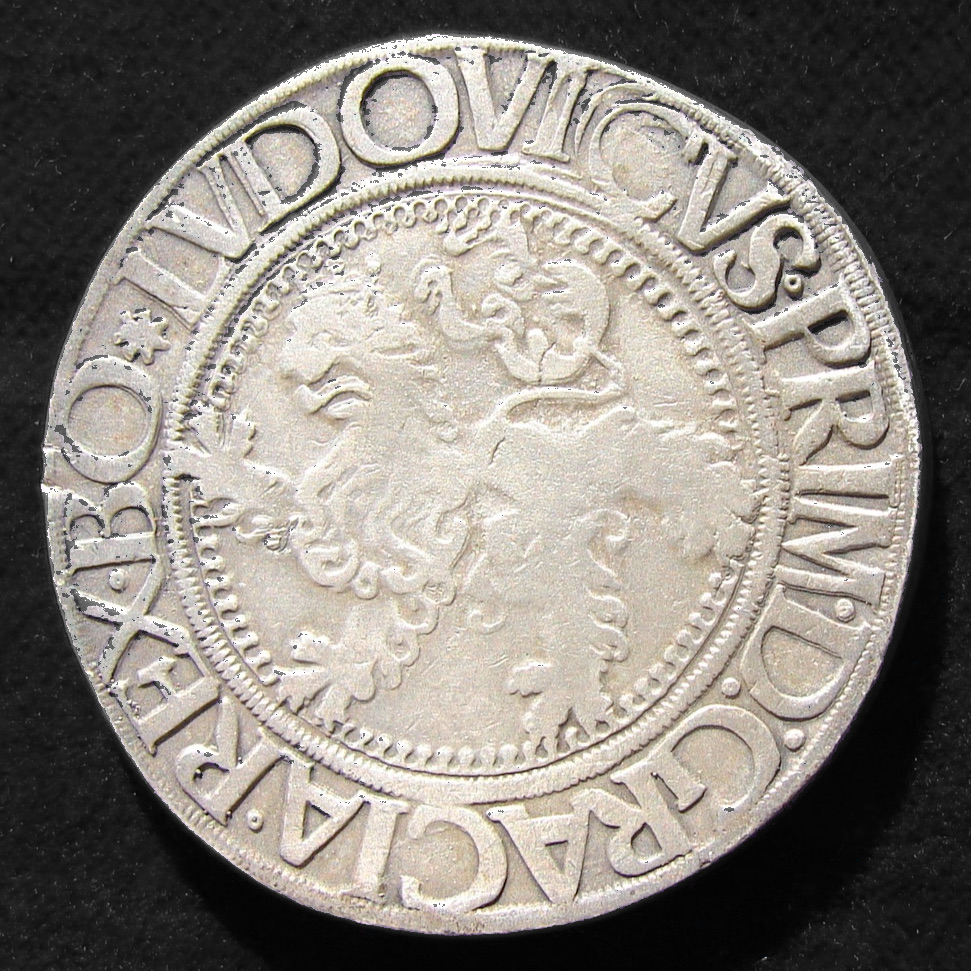
Bohemia, Joachimsthaler 1525. Reverse, picturing the Bohemian Lion.

The tolar (German: Thaler) or Jáchymovský tolar was a silver coin minted in the Kingdom of Bohemia from 1520 until 1672 in Jáchymov (German: Joachimsthal). The obverse of the coin depicts Saint Joachim with the coat-of-arms of the noble family Schlik, who founded the mint in the Ore Mountains, with the titles of the Schlik brothers in inscription: "STEPHANI:ET:FRATRVM: COMITVM:DE:BASSANO" (without abbreviations). The reverse side depicts the crowned Bohemian lion with the title of the Bohemian King Louis of the Jagiellonian dynasty: "LVDOVICVS DEI GRACIA REX BOHEMIAE" (without abbreviations).

The modern word dollar was derived from the Spanish dollar, so-called in the English-speaking world because they were of similar size and weight to the German Thalers. The German Thalers were so named because they were first minted from a silver mine in 1520 in Joachimsthal.

It was the main silver currency in Bohemia from 1520 to 1750.

== See also ==
- Slovenian tolar, the currency of Slovenia from 1991 to 2006.
