= Marc Chardon =

- Born: November 1, 1955 (age 70); Concord, New Hampshire, USA
- Education: Phillips Academy, Harvard University
- Occupations: entrepreneur, advisor
- Known for: Former CEO and President of Blackbaud, Inc.

Marc E. Chardon (born November 1, 1955) is an American-French dual national who was previously the CEO and President, Blackbaud, Inc., a software and services provider for the nonprofit sector, until August 31, 2013. He is currently an advisor at Genstar Capital.

Before joining Blackbaud in 2005, Chardon held the position of CFO for Microsoft Corp.'s Information Worker Business Group. In this role, he was responsible for developing a sustainable growth strategy and plan for the business, which includes Microsoft Office, Microsoft Project, LiveMeeting and other related products. He first joined Microsoft in August 1998 as general manager of Microsoft France. Prior to that, he was general manager of Digital France where he held a variety of international marketing and business roles within the company.

== Biography ==
=== Early life ===
Chardon was born in Concord, New Hampshire, the first of three children of Alain and Phoebe Chardon. He is the grandson of Clifford Warren Ashley, painter and author of several books including The Ashley Book of Knots, and great-grandson of Paul-Henri-Benjamin d'Estournelles de Constant. Chardon’s interest in technology was sparked in his early teens by a subscription to Popular Electronics. His first technology project was assembling a Heathkit short-wave radio.

=== Education ===
Chardon graduated cum laude from Phillips Academy in Andover in 1972. During his time at the Academy, he began programming in BASIC on a PDP-10 time-sharing machine, which led to a passion for computers. He went on to graduate magna cum laude with an economics degree from Harvard University, where he developed acumen in international business and strategic planning.

=== Philanthropy ===
Chardon’s first taste of philanthropy came during his teenage years when he worked to restore historic buildings in New Bedford, Massachusetts that were saved by Waterfront Historic Area LeaguE (WHALE), a nonprofit organization founded by his grandmother Sarah Delano.

Chardon later served on the board of U.S. Tech Corps , a group that mobilized information industry professionals to help schools with their networking needs. His work with the Concord Technical Advisory Committee led to the formation of a technology plan for the Concord, Massachusetts school system. Chardon also previously served as treasurer of his church’s prison outreach program and helped bring alternative to violence programs to Concord prisons. In addition, he served on the Council for Advancement and Support of Education (CASE) Industry Advisory Council (IAC)

Chardon is currently a member of the Board of Governors, College of Charleston School of Business and Economics and a founding partner and chairman of the Charleston Philanthropic Partnership (a social venture partnership). Through his philanthropic vision, Blackbaud was honored as the 2007 AFP Outstanding Business for its corporate commitment to philanthropy and community involvement. In 2010, he formalized the company's corporate citizenship program, directly overseeing many philanthropic initiatives.

=== Business ===
Chardon was Chief Executive Officer of Blackbaud until 2013 when he stepped down. When leaving in 2013, Chardon planned to spend time investing and advising tech start-ups.

Under Chardon's leadership, Blackbaud has earned many distinctions, including being ranked #54 on Forbes Best Small Companies in America list , being named to the InformationWeek 500 , and Software Magazine's Software 500 .
