= Convio =

US software company

- Type: Subsidiary
- Traded as: Nasdaq: CNVO
- Industry: Software
- Founded: November 1999; 27 years ago
- Founder: Vinay Bhagat; Dave Crooke
- Parent: Blackbaud

Convio was a software company based in Austin, Texas, in the US, with offices in Washington, DC, and Emeryville, California. Convio provided internet marketing and business management applications tailored specifically for non-profit organizations, and virtually all of its customers were charities, educational establishments, and political advocacy groups. Convio was acquired by Blackbaud in May 2012 for $325 million.

== History ==
Convio was founded in November 1999 by Vinay Bhagat and Dave Crooke, using venture capital funding led by Austin Ventures. The inspiration for the company was the inefficient pen and paper administration of telethons then used by PBS and NPR stations to raise funds from the public. In contrast to many of its then competitors, who focused merely on facilitating donations via credit card transactions on the internet, the vision for Convio was to empower the non-profit sector to make use of the internet by building a commoditized suite of software tools to allow charities and other non-profit organizations to cultivate relationships with their supporters and other constituents via the Internet, and with the goal that these tools could be used directly by the organizations' communications professionals, with the simplicity of desktop word processing software, rather than only being usable by webmasters and IT administrators. The original "placeholder" name of Convio was ShowSupport.com, to evoke the idea of people showing support for causes they believe in.

The name "Convio" (pronounced con-VEE-oh) is false Latin for "with vision" and was chosen to be abstract, short, memorable, and because the internet domain name convio.com was not previously registered. The company logo is intended to represent both a human eye for the concept of vision, and an enthusiastic caryatid with upraised arms for the concept of people giving their support.

Because of the high complexity of operating Internet server systems, and the relatively low levels of IT staffing that non-profit organizations can afford compared to commercial companies, Convio made the then-bold decision to be one of the first companies to operate its software products solely on its own infrastructure, a business model now known as "software as a service" (SaaS). Customers of SaaS companies do not receive copies of the software to run on their own computers, but instead access the software over the Internet using a web browser.

In January 2007, Convio acquired GetActive Software, then the second largest eCRM provider for non-profit organizations in the USA. GetActive Software was founded by Bill Pease, Sheeraz Haji, Tom Krackeler, Ken Leiserson and other former staff members at the Environmental Defense Fund who had been doing work within that organization to enable internet activism via the then nascent World Wide Web. They realized that many non-profit organizations could benefit from the same technology, and set up a spin-off commercial software company to further develop and distribute it, with Environmental Defense as a shareholder. The original "placeholder" name of GetActive was Locus Pocus, a pun on the concept of using address mapping technology to connect a visitor to a web site with the political representatives for their district.

Convio had its IPO on April 29, 2010, on the NASDAQ.

Convio was acquired by Blackbaud in May 2012 for $325 million.

== Controversy ==
From 2005 to 2007, Convio was the target of a boycott campaign led by well known left political bloggers John Aravosis and Markos Moulitsas on their respective blogs Americablog and Daily Kos because of the company's stance in serving clients with views from across the political spectrum.

At least one of the blogs may have softened its stance, with the Daily Kos blog linking to political advocacy campaigns powered by Convio's software.

== Acquisition ==
On January 17, 2012, Convio announced that it had entered into an agreement to be acquired by Blackbaud, Inc. (NASDAQ: BLKB) at a price of $16.00 per share, a 49% premium over its market price.

On May 7, 2012, the acquisition was completed, and Convio became fully owned by Blackbaud.
