= John Alexander Milne =

(1872–1918) farmer, agent and soldier

Lt. Col. John Alexander ("Jock") Milne DSO (1872-1918), began life in rural Aberdeenshire. He rose through the ranks of the Australian Imperial Force during the First World War, finally attaining the rank of Lieutenant Colonel. He served with distinction at both Gallipoli and on the Western Front. He is much celebrated in his adopted home town of Bundaberg, Queensland, earning a place in the Australian Dictionary of Biography.

== Early life ==
Milne was born at Woodside of Homhead, Braes of Cromar, near Logie Coldstone in the county of Aberdeenshire in Scotland on 23 March 1872, son of Alexander Milne, labourer and Jane McCombie, a dressmaker. He grew up in the nearby parish of Kincardine O'Neil, attending school in the village of Torphins, and for that reason is commemorated there on the parish war memorials in Tarland, Kincardine O'Neil and Torphins.

In 1890, aged 18, Milne emigrated to Australia. He found work as a farm labourer, miner, engine driver, farmer and commercial traveller in agricultural hardware. In 1898, he married Marie Elise May Bull at Kilkavian Junction, Queensland. They had three sons. He also had an interest in military matters, and by 1908 was an officer in the 1st Battalion of the Wide Bay Regiment.

== First World War ==
=== Gallipoli ===
Milne (then aged 42) enlisted in the Australian Imperial Force (9th Battalion) very shortly after the war broke out, on 20 August 1914. He was accorded the rank of Captain and dispatched to Gallipoli. The objective of this action was to capture a gun battery at Gaba Tepe. “A” and “B” companies of the 9th Battalion landing party having landed to the left of their intended objective, Captain Milne nevertheless led his isolated “C” company to the right, in a daring assault upon a strategically vital Turkish artillery battery, capturing it in the face of very heavy fire. In two separate incidents in the course of the day, he sustained serious wounds of the left hand and arm, resulting among other things in the amputation of the terminal phalanx of a finger, in hospital in Cairo a few days later. The wound then became infected.

Mrs Milne was informed in a telegram that her husband had been severely wounded. He was declared unfit for service for four months. A more favourable report was sent to her on 11 June 1915, but a week later Milne was shipped to England and admitted to the Royal Free Hospital in London. It was not until October 1915 that he returned to Egypt for duty.

Within a few weeks of his return, Capt. Milne was promoted to the rank of Major; but on 12 November er 1915, he took ill with paratyphoid fever and was again transferred to hospital. He wrote home from the !st Australian General Hospital in Heliopolis in terms which clearly alarmed Mrs Milne, talking of Mediterranean fever "caught too just as I was going to get a Temp. Lieut. Col. My luck is out. I am very sick so you must just let me say a Merry Xmas and H N Year to you and the boys and all at St M....I am sick and lonely". Mrs Milne forwarded this letter to the Base Records office on 30 December 1915, with a stamped addressed envelope for its return, complaining that she had not been informed of her husband’s illness and that her letters (“I send at least one by every mail”) were clearly not reaching him. She inquired as to his present condition and whereabouts. No doubt she was much cheered by a telegram on 11 January 1916, informing her that her husband was on his way back to Australia on the Ulysses (following certification by a medical board) for “three months change”.

=== Western Front ===
On his return home, Major Milne was enthusiastically received, made recruiting speeches, unveiled the honour board at St Andrews Presbyterian Church Bundaberg, and went on a fishing holiday at Urangan. In May 1916 he embarked again from Sydney, this time for France via England. A note in his record dated 5 September 1916 reads “Rejoined Unit from Cookery School Weymouth” (where there was an AIF command depot). He then proceeded to Le Havre from Southampton on 25 November. In February 1917 Major Milne was attached to the 36th Battalion, and in the following month granted the temporary rank of Lt. Col., the temporary promotion being made permanent in April. In May 1917, he had a week’s leave in England, after which he rejoined his unit. On 25 August 1917, Lt. Col. Milne was awarded the DSO (Distinguished Service Order) for gallantry at St Yves (a locale in Belgium significant in the Battle of Messines) 7–12 July 1917.

In November 1917, Milne was granted a week’s leave in Paris, during which he again received recognition for his gallant conduct, being mentioned in dispatches “for Distinguished and gallant Services & devotion to duty in the field during the period 26 February 1917 to midnight 20/21 September 1917”.

In January 1918 he was sent for a few days’ flying course in Belgium, followed by a month’s leave in the UK. During this time he was in Scotland and bought a shotgun, which Mrs Milne understood was to be given to his eldest son (also on active service) if anything happened to him. It was to be his last period of leave.

In March 1918, Mrs Milne, anxious for news as she had not heard from her husband since a cable of Christmas greetings on 16 December, wrote again to Base Records “I know he was not too well, result of being blown up by a gas shell but he was still in action Nov.28th”. A reply came back on 14 March 1918 reassuring her that no report of casualty had been received.

=== Villers-Bretonneux 4 April 1918 ===
March 1918 marked the beginning of a German offensive on the Western Front, masterminded by General Erich Ludendorff which aimed to attack, break through and separate French and British lines. On 21 March 1918, the Germans launched a major offensive against the British Fifth and Third armies between the Somme and Flanders. This forced the greatest retreat of the war by the British army. By the end of March, the allied line had been pushed back by about 20 miles. Casualties were massive on both sides. By 4 April 1918, a crucial point of allied communications at Amiens was under threat of imminent capture. The allies, under General Gough, had established defences at Villers-Bretonneux. The village was strategically vital, as capture by the enemy would bring their artillery within range of bombarding Amiens. On the afternoon of 4 April 1918, allied forces began to withdraw in the face of what seemed to be irresistible opposition. However, a small force of British and Australian reserves, with Col. Milne leading the 36th Australian Infantry Battalion, supported by a company of the 35thAustralians and soldiers of the 6th Battalion London Regiment made a resolute counter-attack, successfully pushed back the 9th Bavarians despite being outnumbered, and were able to hold an extended defensive line against difficult odds. This had the effect of rallying others, and inspired further counter-attacks.

By next evening it was clear that the assault on Villers-Bretonneux had failed. General Ludendorff wrote of this episode in his war memoirs: “It was an established fact that the enemy’s resistance was beyond our strength…In agreement with the commanders concerned, G.H.Q. had to take the extremely difficult decision to abandon the attack on Amiens for good…The battle was over by the 4th April…”.

Researchers in recent years under the sponsorship of the Returned & Services League of Australia, have argued that this action marked a fundamental turning point in the course of the war. Certainly, Col. Milne and those under his command played a key role in the action on that day.

== Death and aftermath ==
Eight days later, on 12 April 1918, Jock Milne’s brave and illustrious career came to an end at the age of 46. A report from Lieut. Dunn, Assistant Adjutant, records:

“Colonel Milne was badly mutilated by a shell that exploded right into Headquarters whilst he was dictating orders to the Adjutant. He was buried…about 20 yards from the spot at which he was killed. A suitable wooden cross was prepared and erected”.

When the news reached Bundaberg, flags were flown at half-mast as a mark of respect. The army forwarded to Mrs Milne the insignia of her husband’s DSO in January of 1919. Correspondence followed regarding his various belongings. In April Mrs Milne wrote enquiring, pointing out that a year had passed since her husband’s death, and was informed (the news lagging some considerable time after the event once again) that three packages, sent from England on the S.S Barunga the previous June, had gone down with the ship when it was lost in transit as a result of enemy action. Inventories of Milne’s belongings were preserved. They betray a more than passing interest in both fishing and the various accoutrements of smoking, but also included books and letters, mathematical instruments, a portable camera, photographs and map of Paris. His kit bag, retrieved from the field, contained “Scotch heather” – a souvenir perhaps of the trip to Scotland shortly before his death. According to the Australian Dictionary of Biography, drawing among other things on personal information, Milne was an excellent rifle-shot,

“Strong, broad-shouldered, seemingly fearless, with a powerful voice and marked Scotch accent, the sandy-haired Milne was well-liked and respected by his troops. A rugged individualist, with little respect for formality though a rigid disciplinarian, he was an eminently practical and competent soldier with a strong sense of duty”.
