= JustGiving =

Global online social platform for giving

Giving Limited
- Trade name: JustGiving
- Type: Limited company
- Founded: 2000; 26 years ago
- Founders: Zarine Kharas; Anne-Marie Huby
- Headquarters: Bankside, London, England, UK
- Key people: Dame Zarine Kharas (CEO); Anne-Marie Huby (managing director)
- Revenue: £14m (2011)
- Net income: £1.5m (2011)
- Number of employees: 160
- Website: justgiving.com

JustGiving is a British multinational online social platform for charity giving. The company was founded in 2000 and is headquartered in Bankside, London, England. JustGiving has been owned by Blackbaud since its acquisition in October 2017. As of September 2025, JustGiving has 25,700 charities using its platform and 22 million users globally.

== History ==
In 2000, Zarine Kharas and Anne-Marie Huby founded JustGiving (initially clickforaction.com), a company to provide online tools and processing services to enable the collection of charitable donations.

In 2002, JustGiving won the New Media Awards Grand Prix award and also Best Use of the Web award.

In 2004, JustGiving was recognised in the 2004 Charity Times annual Awards in their Fundraising & IT Services category. Charity Times said the company had "transformed the face of donating in the UK".

2006 was the firm's first profitable year. In June 2011, the firm claimed that it had provided its service for more than 9,000 UK registered charities and 1.9 million fundraising pages for users, collecting more than £770 million since launch. The cumulative total passed £1 billion in March 2012. The cumulative total passed £4 billion in June 2016.

== Fees ==
JustGiving charged a 5% fee on all donations to cover the cost of running the business until March 2019, when the fee was made voluntary. In 2008, The Guardian reported Kharas as acknowledging that "the commission charged by justgiving.com is controversial".

== Notable fundraisers ==
In January 2010, Charlie Simpson, aged seven, raised more than £210,000 (£145,000 in the first 48 hours) via his JustGiving page for the 2010 Haiti earthquake relief programme by UNICEF.

In March 2014, Christian Smith was killed in a crash with a car during a 24-hour charity bike ride for Mind. Donations via his JustGiving page rose to more than £68,000 after his death was covered in the media.

In April 2014, Stephen Sutton raised more than £4.5 million for the Teenage Cancer Trust, after help from celebrity backers including Jason Manford.

In April 2020, Captain Sir Tom Moore, by the end of a fundraising walk, had raised £32,796,155 (the most ever raised on the JustGiving platform) by completing one-hundred, 25 metres (82 feet) laps of his garden in Bedfordshire to raise funds for the UK National Health Service (NHS), to aid the NHS during the COVID-19 pandemic in the United Kingdom, and to mark his 100th birthday on 30 April 2020. The initial £1,000 goal was realised on 10 April and the target was increased to £100,000 and then to £500,000 as more people around the world donated. On completion, Moore said he would not stop and aimed to do a second hundred laps.

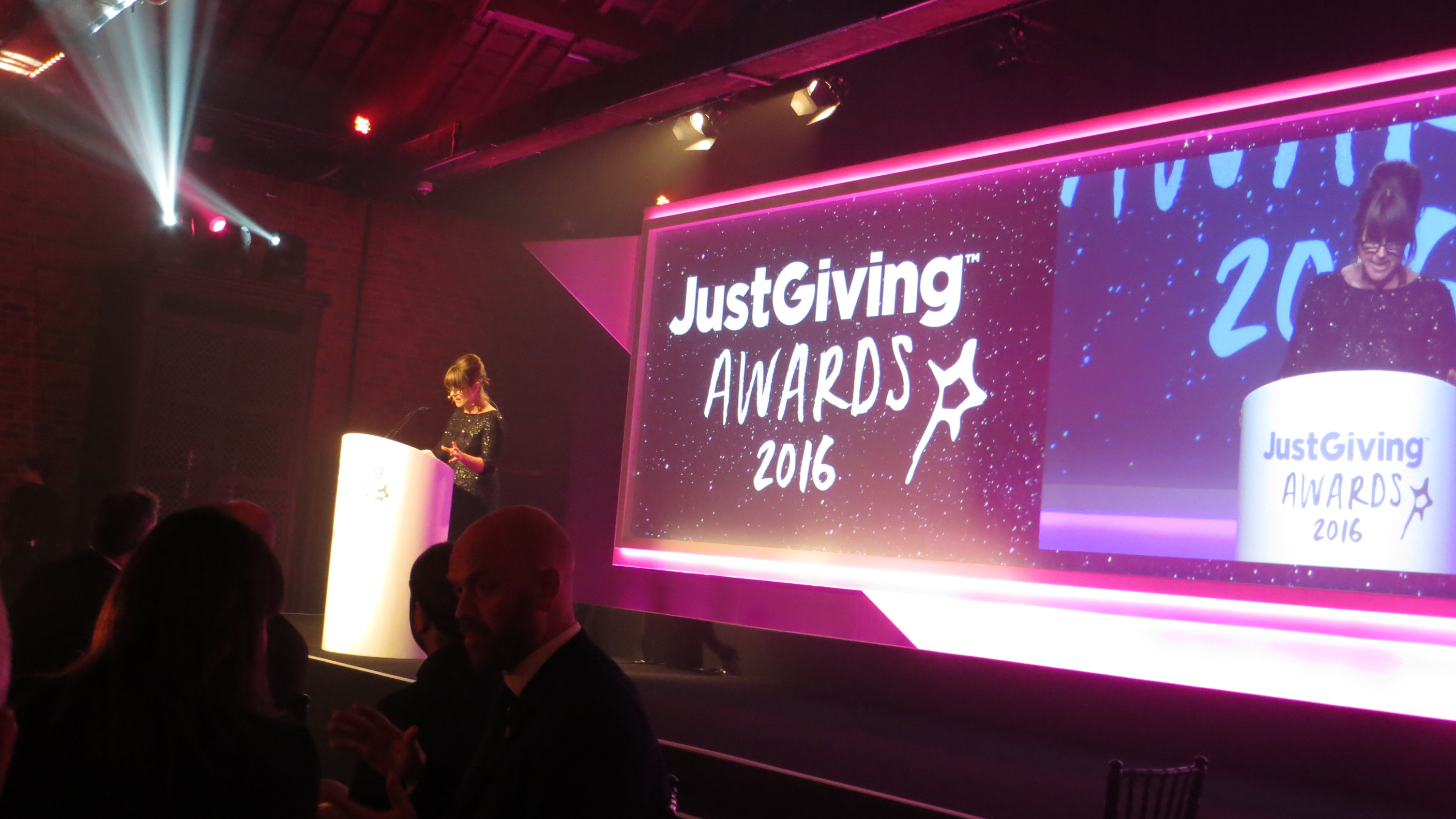
Caroline Jones presenting the JustGiving Awards 2016

== Corporate affairs ==
=== Ownership ===
JustGiving was acquired by U.S.-based Blackbaud, Inc. for £95 million in October 2017.

Blackbaud were criticised in the wake of the Robb Elementary School shooting for its links with the National Rifle Association of America.

=== International expansion and U.S. subsidiary sale ===
In 2003, JustGiving launched a subsidiary in the United States, changing its name to FirstGiving in 2005. FirstGiving is located in Somerville, Massachusetts. In 2010, The New York Times reported that FirstGiving.com was "among the best known" online fund-raising sites. In August 2012, FirstGiving was acquired by FrontStream Holdings, LLC.

=== Finances ===
In February 2017, JustGiving was reported to be taking more than £20 million from fundraisers while paying staff up to £200,000. It takes a cut from most donations and while some of the money is used for maintenance, product development and charity training, accounts show that more than £10 million was spent on staff costs in 2016. This includes an average salary of more than £60,000 for some directors, sales and administration workers, with the head of the firm having earned approximately £198,000. A charity chief executive had accused JustGiving of being greedy, saying the fees were "hard to stomach" and fundraisers had expressed their anger, labelling the site "JustTaking".
