= London Irish Centre =

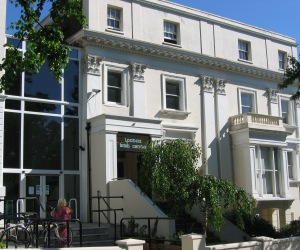
- Formation: 1955
- Founder: Catholic Church
- Type: Charity
- Registration no.: 1149787 (Charity Commission)
- Purpose: To provide support for young Irish emigrants in London
- Headquarters: Camden Square
- Location: Camden, London
- Coordinates: 51°32′38″N 0°7′57″W
- Staff: 34 (2023)

The London Irish Centre is a charity based in Camden, London, which has served the Irish community since 1955.

With a recession in Ireland in the mid-20th century, and Britain in need of workers in a number of industries and services, tens of thousands of Irish people migrated to Britain. The centre itself opened in 1955, providing accommodation (serving as a hostel in its early years), employment support and a starting point to those arriving. The Camden Square location was chosen for its proximity to Euston Station, where Irish people disembarked their trains from Holyhead Ferry Port. The London Irish Centre also became a hub of social activity, with dinners, dances and social functions. Throughout history, the Centre has become an iconic landmark for the Irish in London, hosting visits from Presidents of Ireland Mary Robinson (in 1993) and Michael D. Higgins (in 2012). As of 2023, the London Irish Centre's patrons include Ed Sheeran and Dermot O'Leary.

The charity provides a world-class programme of Irish arts and culture, as well as information, advice and community support. The London Irish Centre also run a cafe-bar and venue spaces available for hire.
