= Adolf Patera =

Bohemian chemist, mineralogist and metallurgist

- Born: July 11, 1819; Vienna, Austrian Empire
- Died: June 26, 1894 (aged 74)
- Education: Academy in Banská Štiavnica; 1839-1843
- Occupation: Chemist
- Known for: Utilisation of uranium in colour production in glass. Silver extraction from the mines at Joachimsthal.

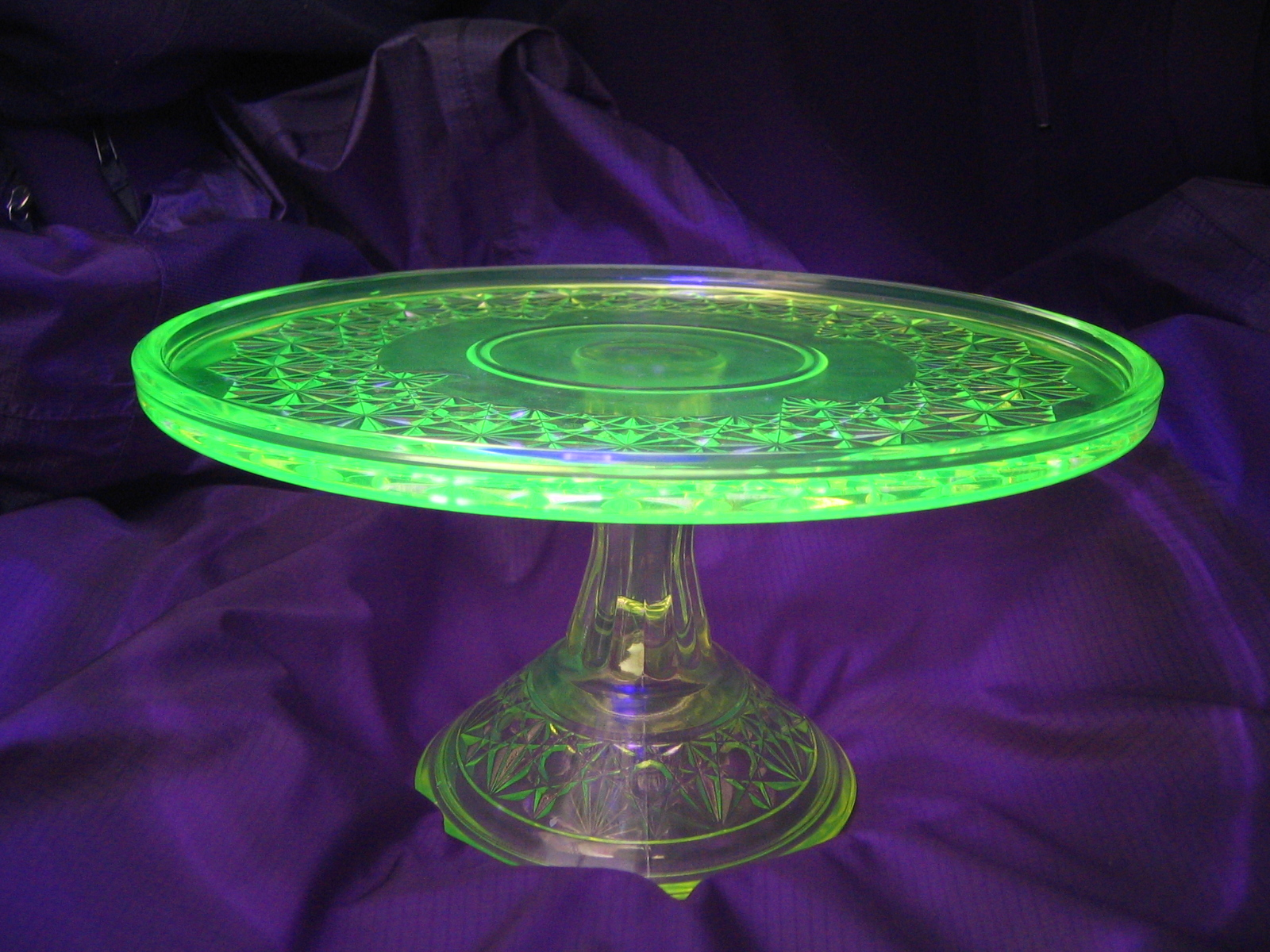
Uranium glass glowing under UV light

Adolf Patera (11 July 1819, in Vienna – 26 June 1894), was a Bohemian chemist, mineralogist and metallurgist, best known for the important role he played in the utilisation of uranium in colour production in glass, and associated with silver extraction from the mines at Joachimsthal, then part of the Austro-Hungarian Empire, now known as Jáchymov. Pateraite, supposedly a cobalt molybdate, is named after him.

Patera studied at the Academy in Banská Štiavnica between 1839 and 1843.

Toward the mid-19th century the rich silver ore of Joachimsthal had been almost exhausted and instead miners encountered a heavy black mineral which they named "Pechblende". Martin Heinrich Klaproth, a chemist, found that it could be used in dye industry. This happened shortly after the discovery of Uranus and Klaproth dubbed the black uranium oxide powder "uranium", mistakenly believing it to be an element. Adolf Patera was asked to examine the commercial possibilities of the new substance, and he presented a paper on the use of uranium to the Imperial Academy of Science in 1847, also describing a method of vanadium extraction from the uranium ores.

This led to the construction of a new factory which started production in 1853 of uranium pigments (sodium, potassium and ammonium diuranates, uranium oxides) for the production of uranium glass from high-grade pitchblende in a process developed by Patera. The process resulted in waste with a high radium content and was used by Pierre and Marie Curie in their separation of radium. The lustrous fire-resistant dyes coming in so many shades of yellow, black, orange and green became extremely popular and they were used as a matter of course for Czech glass and porcelain decoration, with burgeoning exports to Great Britain and France. Uranium glass is considered to be harmless and only marginally more active than background radiation.
