= Jáchymov =

- Town
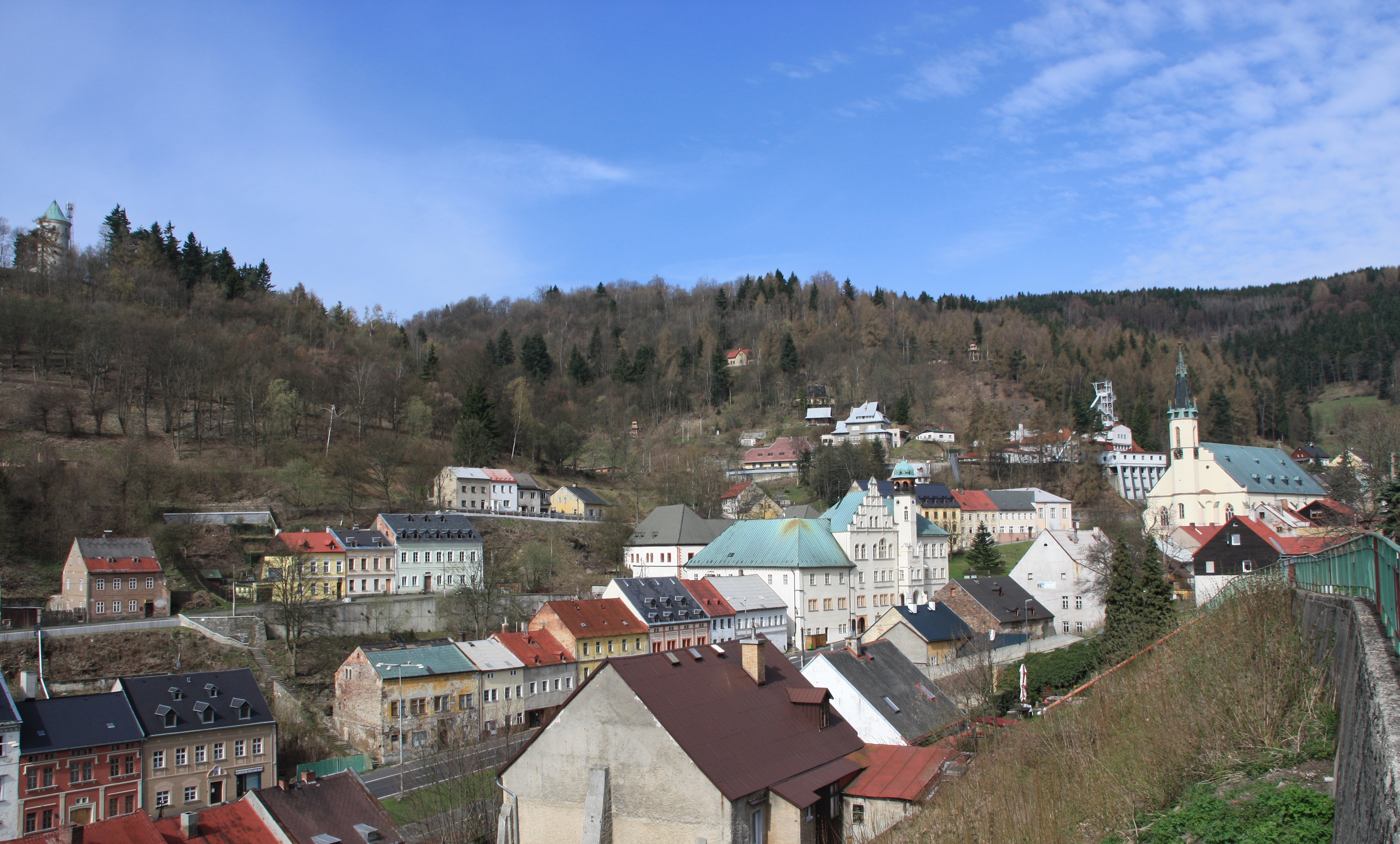
- Upper Jáchymov

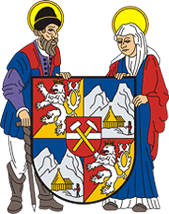
- Flag Coat of arms

- Location in the Czech Republic
- Coordinates: 50°21′58″N 12°55′24″E
- Country: Czech Republic
- Region: Karlovy Vary
- District: Karlovy Vary
- Founded: 1516

Government
  - Mayor: Jiří Kaucký

Area
  - Total: 50.77 km^{2} (19.60 sq mi)
- Elevation: 672 m (2,205 ft)

Population (2026-01-01)
  - Total: 2,248
  - Density: 44.28/km^{2} (114.7/sq mi)
- Time zone: UTC+1 (CET)
  - Summer (DST): UTC+2 (CEST)
- Postal codes: 362 51, 363 01
- Website: www.mestojachymov.cz

UNESCO World Heritage Site
- Part of: Erzgebirge/Krušnohoří Mining Region
- Criteria: Cultural: (ii)(iii)(iv)
- Reference: 1478-018
- Inscription: 2019 (43rd Session)

Jáchymov (Czech pronunciation: [ˈjaːxɪmof]; German: Sankt Joachimsthal or Joachimsthal) is a spa town in Karlovy Vary District in the Karlovy Vary Region of the Czech Republic. It has about 2,200 inhabitants. The town is located in the Ore Mountains.

Jáchymov has a long mining tradition, thanks to which it used to be the second most populous town in the Kingdom of Bohemia in 1534. At first silver was mined here. The silver Joachimsthaler coins minted here since the 16th century gave their name to the Thaler and the dollar. After the Wieliczka Salt Mine ceased industrial exploitation in 2007, the Svornost mine (1525) became the oldest mine still in use in Europe. It was also the first (and for a long time the only) place in the world where radium was mined.

The mining cultural landscape of Jáchymov is a UNESCO World Heritage Site as a part of the Ore Mountain Mining Region. The historic centre of the town is well preserved and protected as an urban monument zone.

== Administrative division ==
Jáchymov consists of five municipal parts (in brackets population according to the 2021 census):

- Jáchymov (1,853)
- Mariánská (230)
- Nové Město (52)
- Suchá (69)
- Vršek (3)

== Etymology ==
The town was founded in a nameless valley called in German just Thal (i.e. "valley"). Later it was named Sankt Joachimsthal after Saint Joachim, meaning "Saint Joachim's Valley". It later developed into the Czech name Jáchymov.

== Geography ==
Jáchymov is located about 15 kilometres (9 mi) north of Karlovy Vary, on the border with Germany. It lies in the Ore Mountains. The municipal territory includes the summit of the highest mountain of the whole mountain range, Klínovec at 1,244 metres (4,081 ft), and the third largest mountain, Božídarský Špičák at 1,115 m (3,658 ft). The town proper is situated in a valley at an altitude of 733 m (2,405 ft) above sea level.

== History ==
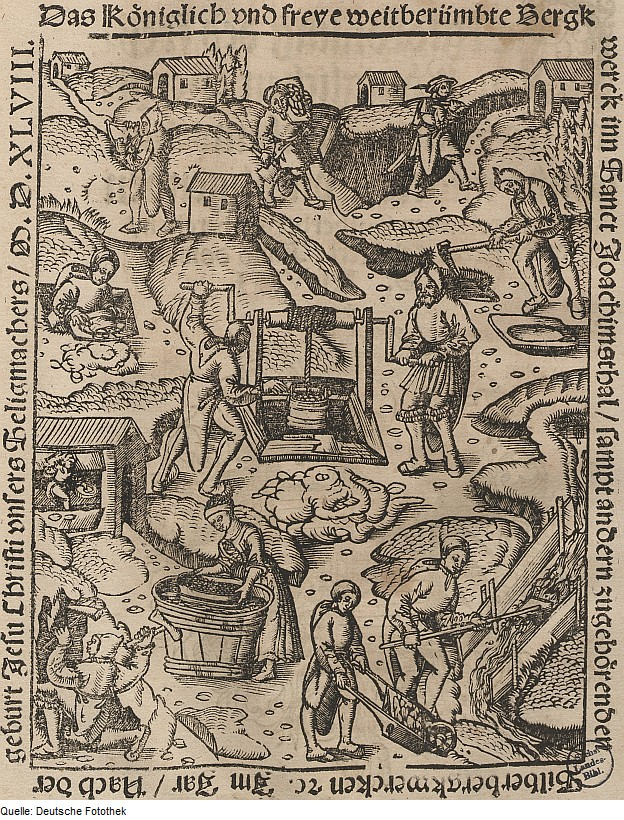
Silver mining in Jáchymov, 1548

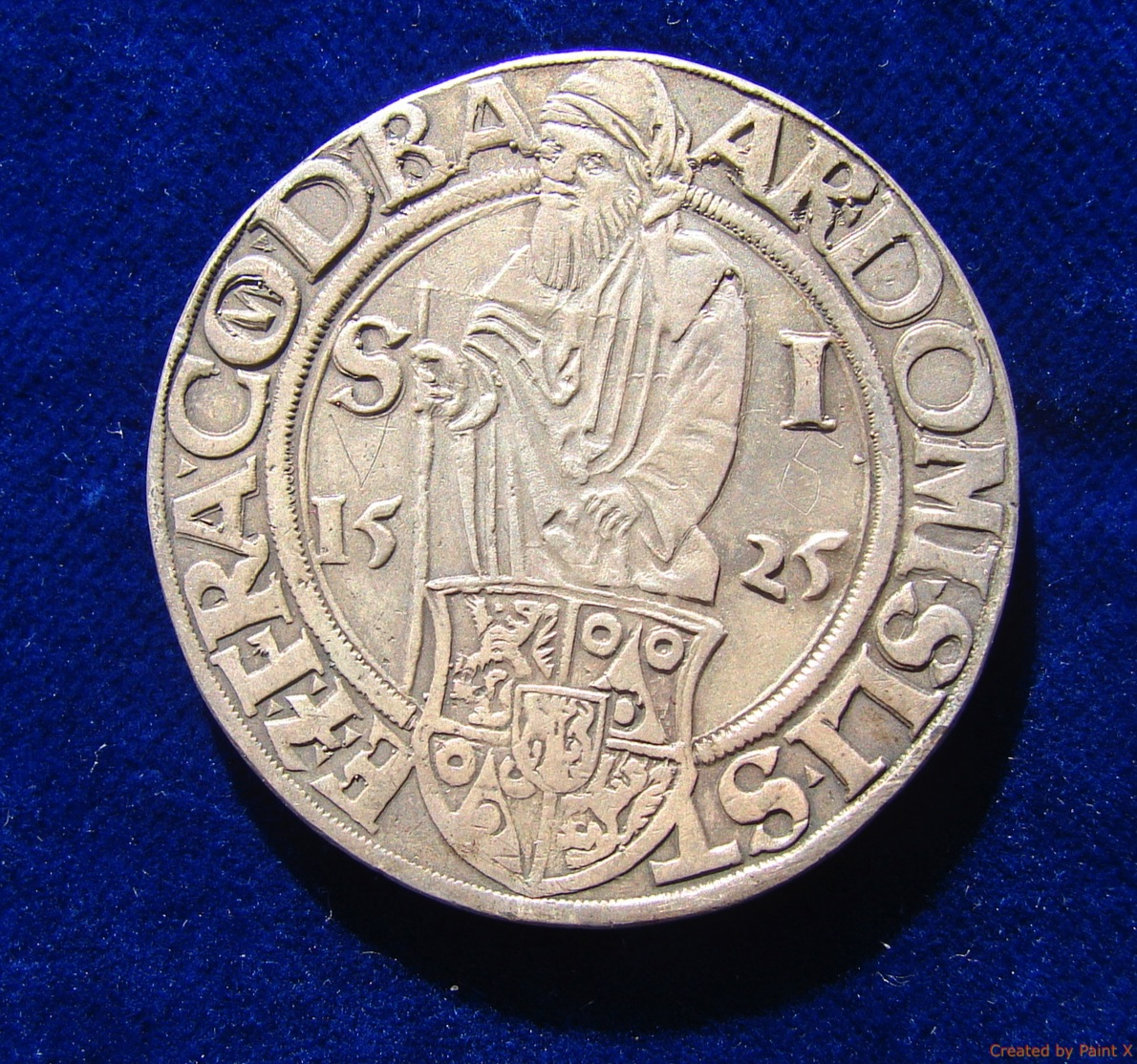
Jáchymovský tolar, obverse picturing St. Joachim (1525)

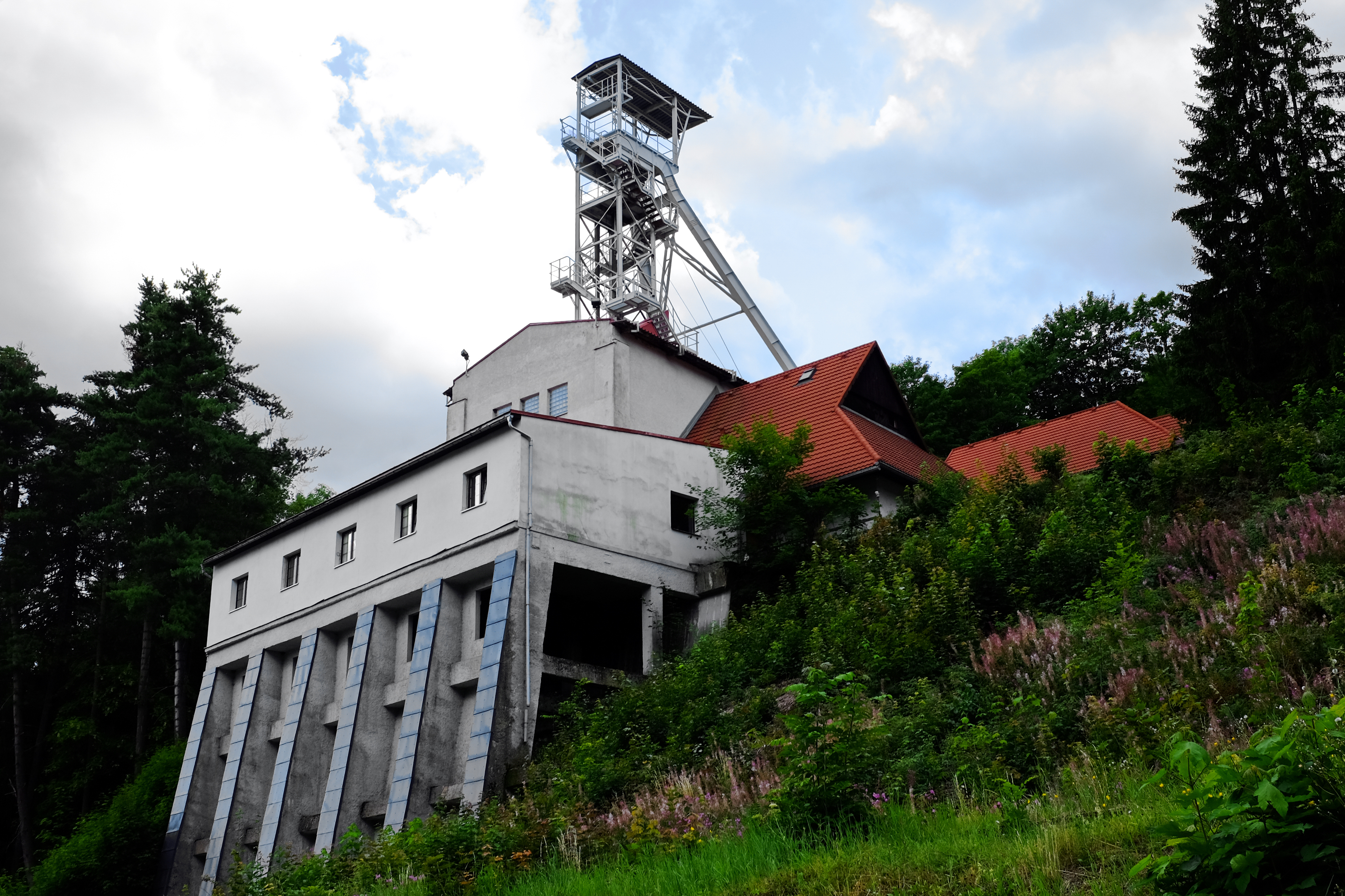
Svornost Mine, the oldest mine still in use in Europe

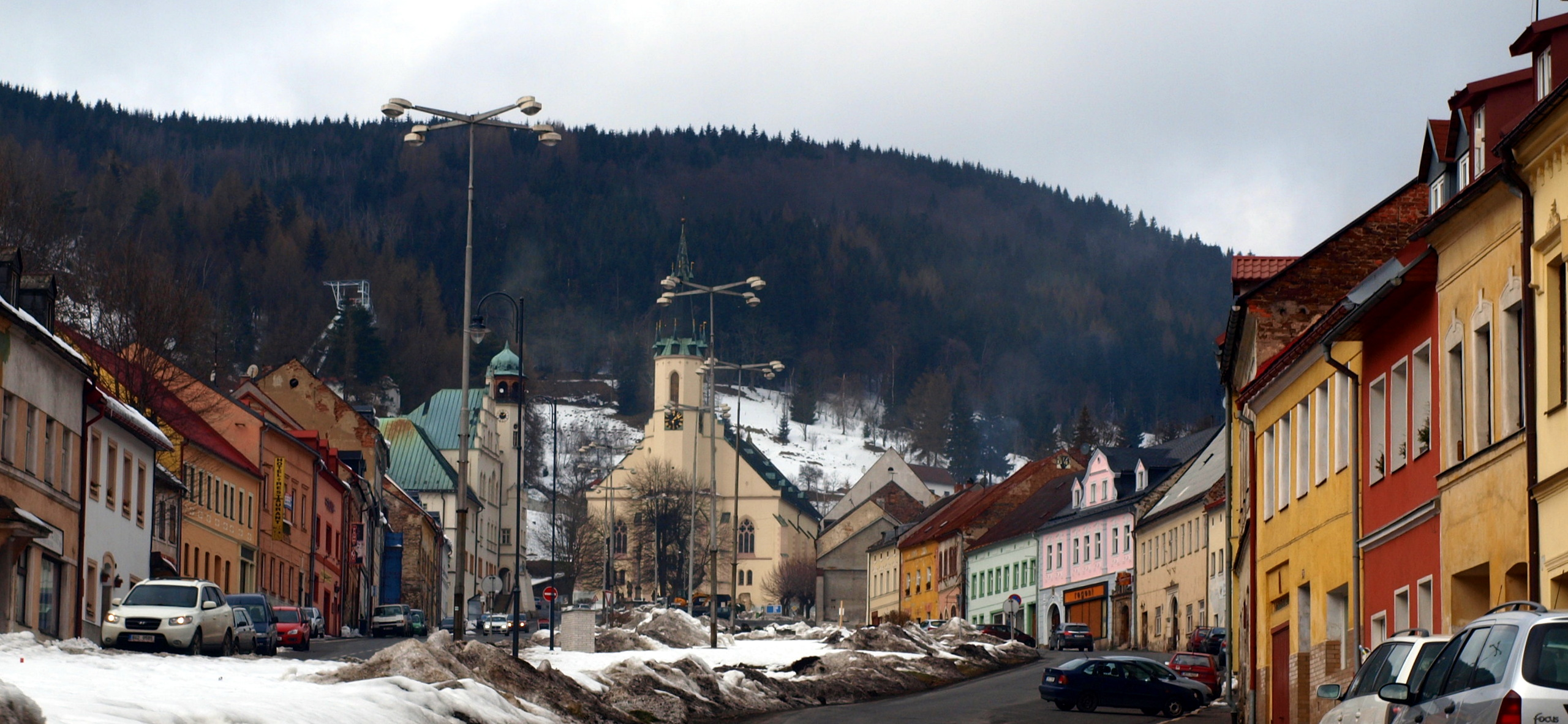
The square Náměstí Republiky

=== 16th–17th centuries ===
In 1512, silver was found in the area. The village of Jáchymov was founded by Steffan Schlick in 1516 under its German name Joachimsthal. The silver caused the population to grow rapidly, and made the Counts of Schlick, whose possessions included the town, one of the richest families in Bohemia. In 1528, Ferdinand I seized the right of mining, and the Schlick family lost their profitable business.

Since 1520, the Schlicks had silver coins minted, which were called Joachimsthalers. They became known in German as Thaler and as tolar in Czech, which via the Dutch daalder or daler is the etymological origin of the currency name "dollar".

The fame of Jáchymov for its ore mining and smelting works attracted the scientific attention of the doctor Georg Bauer (better known by the Latin form of his name, Georgius Agricola) in the late 1527–1531, who based his pioneering metallurgical studies on his observations made here.

In 1534, Jáchymov was the second most populous town in the Kingdom of Bohemia with about 20,000 people, behind Prague.

In 1523, the Protestant Reformation began. In the Schmalkaldic War (1546–1547) Jáchymov was occupied for a time by Saxon troops. When in 1621 the Counter-Reformation and re-Catholicisation took effect in the town, many Lutheran citizens and people from the mountains migrated to nearby Saxon White Serbia. The war, plus the lack of pumps needed to remove water from the deep mines, made it unable to compete with cheap Spanish silver from the Spanish American colonies.

=== 18th–20th centuries ===
In the late 18th century, with Jáchymov's population shrinking due to the decline of silver mining, Martin Heinrich Klaproth discovered that pitchblende, a uranium-rich ore common in the area and long thought to be worthless, could be used to give glass a brilliant yellow colour with green fluorescence. This changed the town's economic fortunes. Klaproth discovered a new element in 1781 and named it "uranium".

In 1851, Adolf Patera found a procedure for preparing "uranium yellow" pigment. A plant was built in 1854 next to the silver smelting factories to process pitchblende into pigment, which was kept secret to protect the monopoly of Bohemian glass manufacturers.

In the 18th century, mining was significant in the town. In addition to silver ore, other ores were mined here: nickel, bismuth, lead, arsenic and cobalt, and near the town also tin. In the 19th century, uranium ore was also extracted in Jáchymov.

There were also other industries than mining: in 1856 and 1860, a uranium paint factory and a tobacco factory were opened. In 1873, the town was badly damaged by a large fire and lost its face. Since the silver operation was also unprofitable, the government of the Austrian Empire decided to close all mines. The town was about to become a ghost town again. At the end of the 19th century, Becquerel discovered that uranyl potassium sulfate could fog photographic papers wrapped inside opaque paper. Marie Skłodowska-Curie and Pierre Curie believed this to be a new element, more radioactive than uranium. The Austrian government sent 100 kg of the waste material from the Joachimsthal uranium-based pigment factory to the Curies, and they discovered uraninite containing the element radium. Until World War I, this was the foremost source of radium in the world. In 1929, Dr. Löwy of Prague discovered that "mysterious emanations" in the mine led to a form of cancer. Ventilation and watering measures were introduced, miners were given higher pay and longer vacations, but death rates remained high.

Following the Munich Agreement in 1938, Jáchymov was annexed by Nazi Germany and administered as part of the Reichsgau Sudetenland. Most of the German population was expelled in 1945–1946 according to the Beneš decrees.

==== Uranium mining ====
Jáchymov was one of the first places of the world where uranium mining began. Mining in uranium mines took place here from 1856. From 1939, uranium was mined for nuclear projects of Nazi facilities. It was proven that the uranium mined here was used in the German nuclear weapons program in their ultimately unsuccessful quest to build a nuclear reactor.

In times of Nazi occupation and Communism, large prison camps were established in the town and around it. Uranium mining began on a large scale after World War II, when the consumption for the production of nuclear weapons and later for the production of electricity in nuclear power plants increased. A total of 7,500 tonnes of uranium ore were mined here, 6,900 of which in the years 1946–1964. Almost all the uranium from Jáchymov was exported to the Soviet Union. In the 1950s, Czechoslovakia became one of the largest producer of uranium in the world, but it caused death of many involuntary miners. The labor camps for uranium mines mainly employed prisoners of war, forcibly recruited citizens of Czechoslovakia from the Sudetenland, political prisoners and opponents of the communist regime. At the peak of mining in 1955, over 46,000 people worked here, 20% of whom were involuntary (but the number of involuntary workers in 1953 exceeded 34%). Uranium mining ceased in 1964.

== Demographics ==
Historical population

Year	Pop.	±%
1869	6,668	—
1880	6,709	+0.6%
1890	7,133	+6.3%
1900	7,487	+5.0%
1910	7,627	+1.9%

Year	Pop.	±%
1921	7,173	−6.0%
1930	7,404	+3.2%
1950	6,659	−10.1%
1961	4,608	−30.8%
1970	3,289	−28.6%

Year	Pop.	±%
1980	3,375	+2.6%
1991	2,716	−19.5%
2001	2,830	+4.2%
2011	2,838	+0.3%
2021	2,207	−22.2%

Source: Censuses

== Spa ==
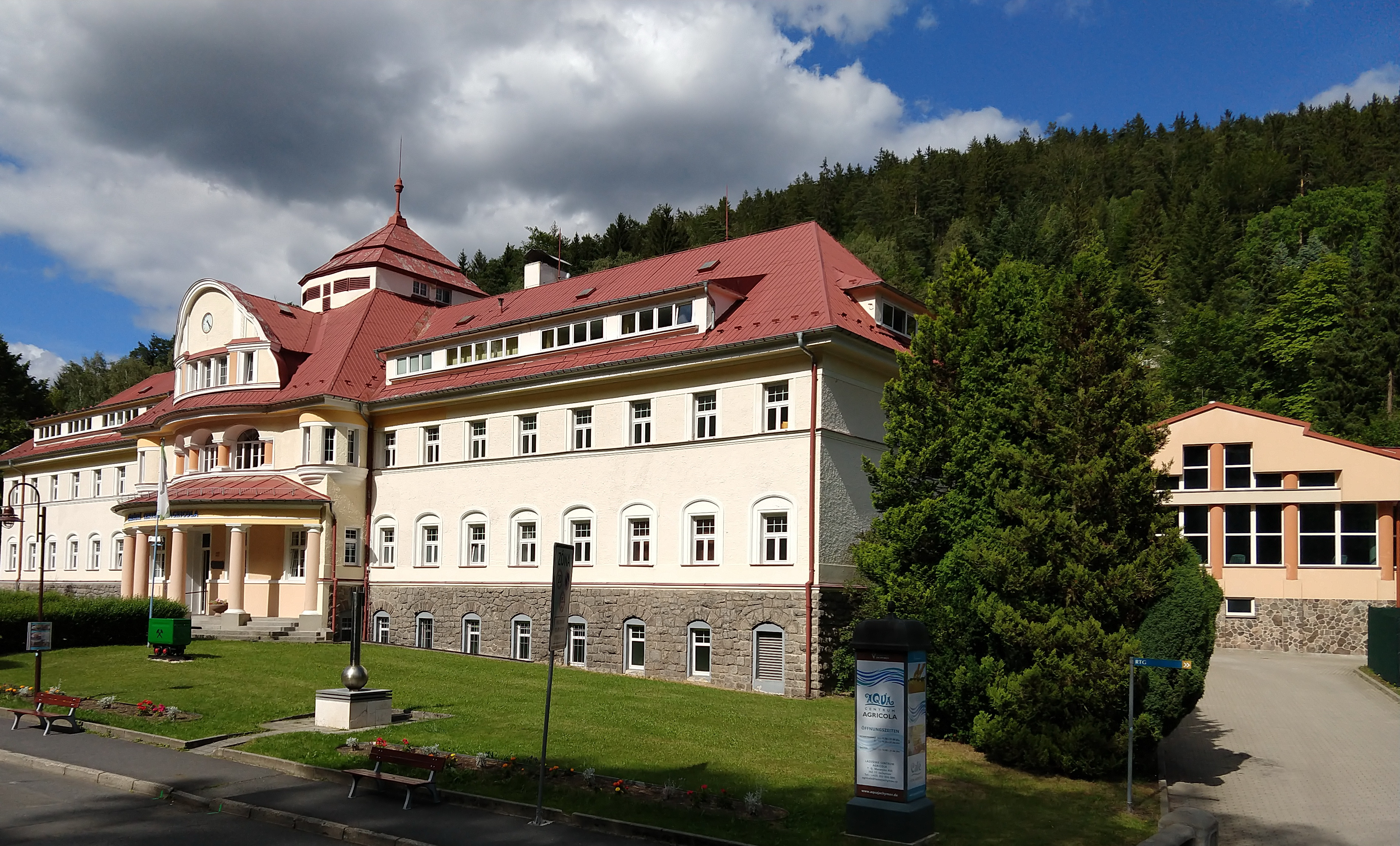
Agricola Spa Centre

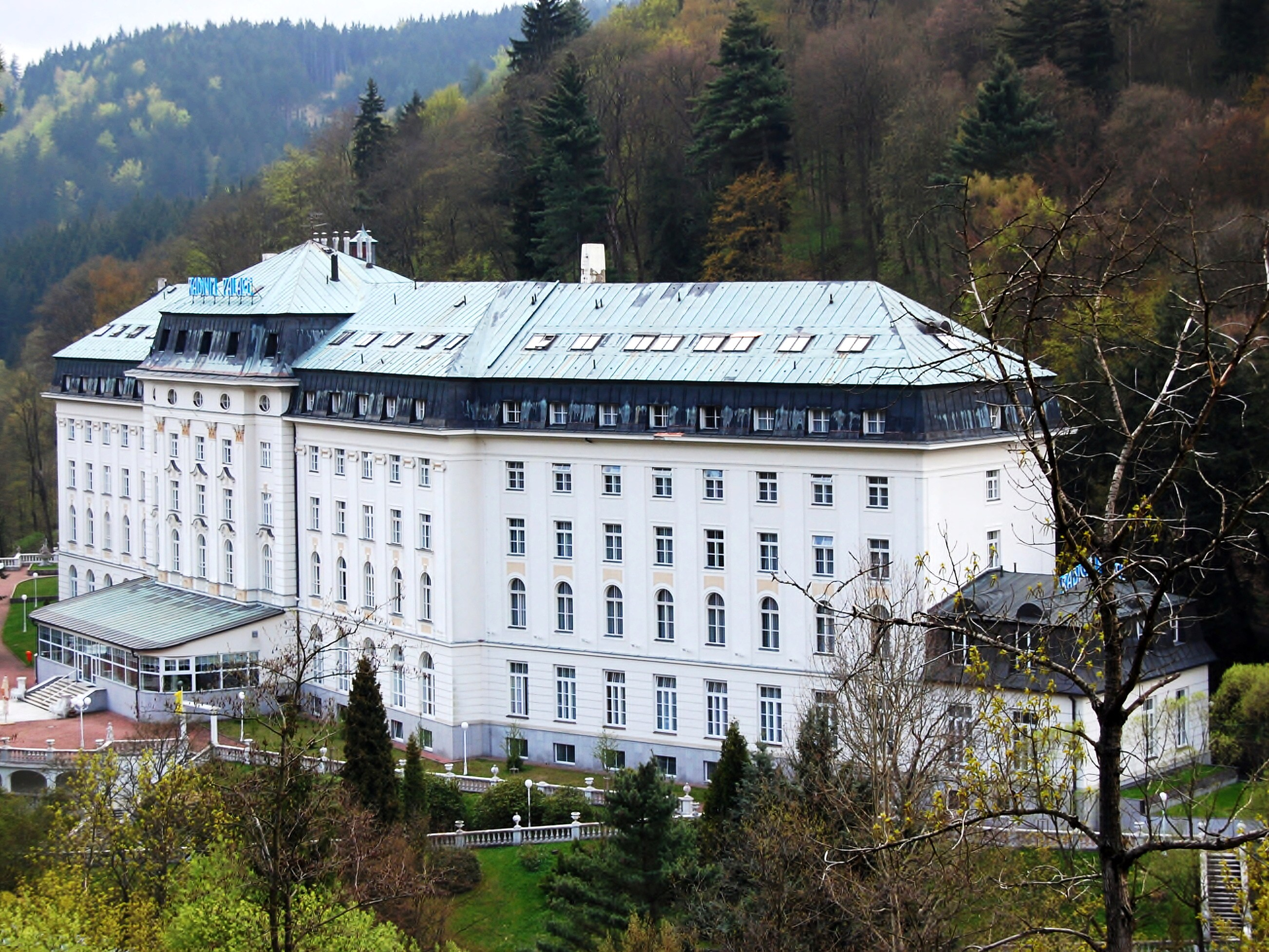
Radium Palace Hotel

In 1864, a spring of radon-rich water was discovered in Jáchymov. The world's first radon spa was founded in Jáchymov in 1906, joining the existing spas of the region such as Karlovy Vary, Františkovy Lázně and Mariánské Lázně.

The facility offers treatments for a range of medical conditions, based on the controversial theory of radiation hormesis. The treatments offered cover a range of neurological disorders and skin diseases, as well as various musculoskeletal conditions such as osteoarthritis and ankylosing spondylitis. The radon baths are further alleged to improve conditions of patients with diabetes, gout and conditions arising from complications of injuries and operations.

== Transport ==
There is no railway to the town. The most important connection is the road I/25 leading from Ostrov to the Czech–German border. The bus line connects Jáchymov with Karlovy Vary.

== Sport ==
Jáchymov is the centre of winter sports. There are three ski areas with ski lifts in the municipal territory: Novako, Klínovec and Klínovec-Neklid. In the vicinity of the town is the Eduard biathlon complex, which offers several kilometres of cross-country trails.

The town has a water park that bears the name of Georgius Agricola.

== Sights ==
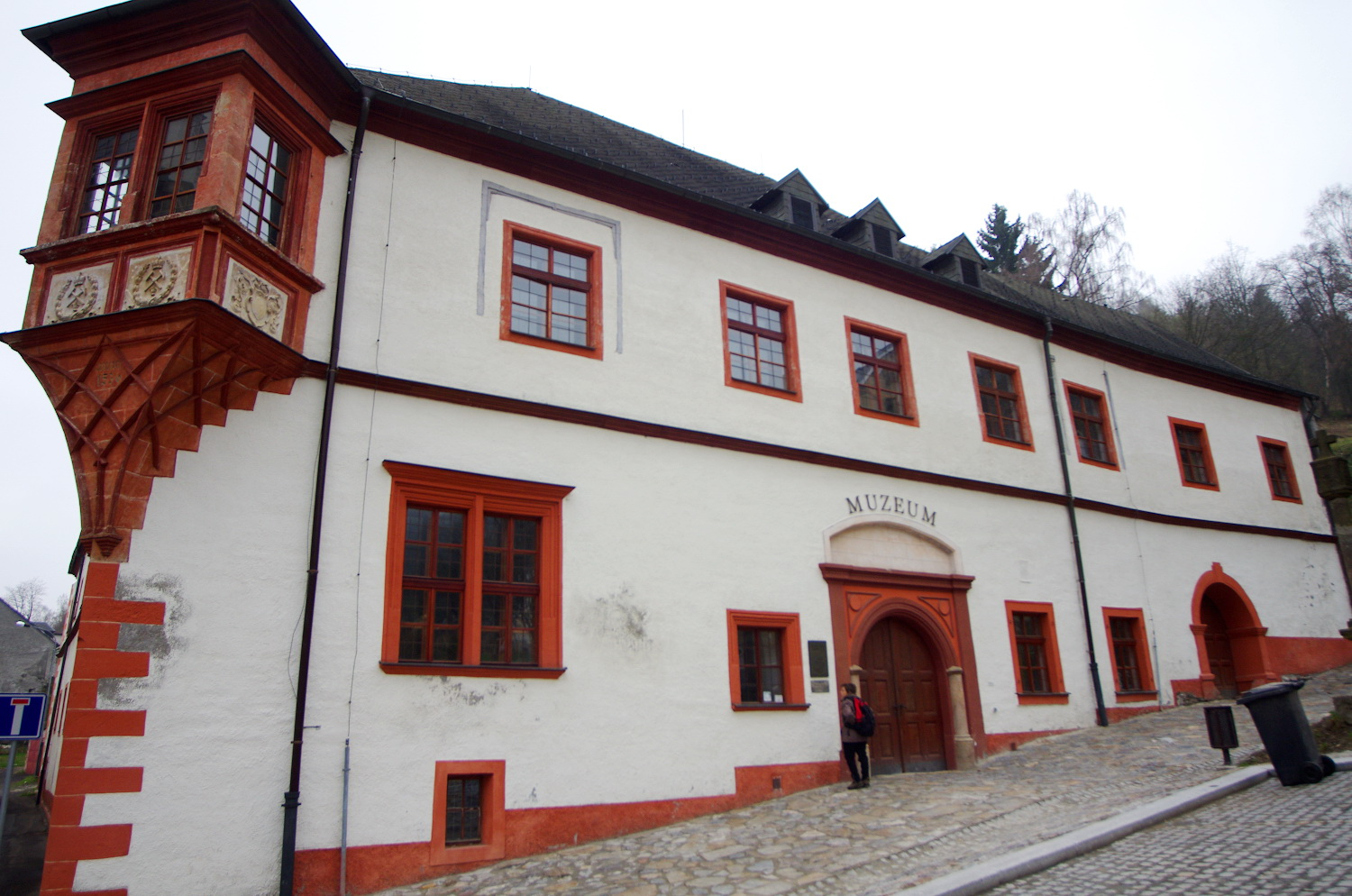
Royal Mint Jáchymov Museum

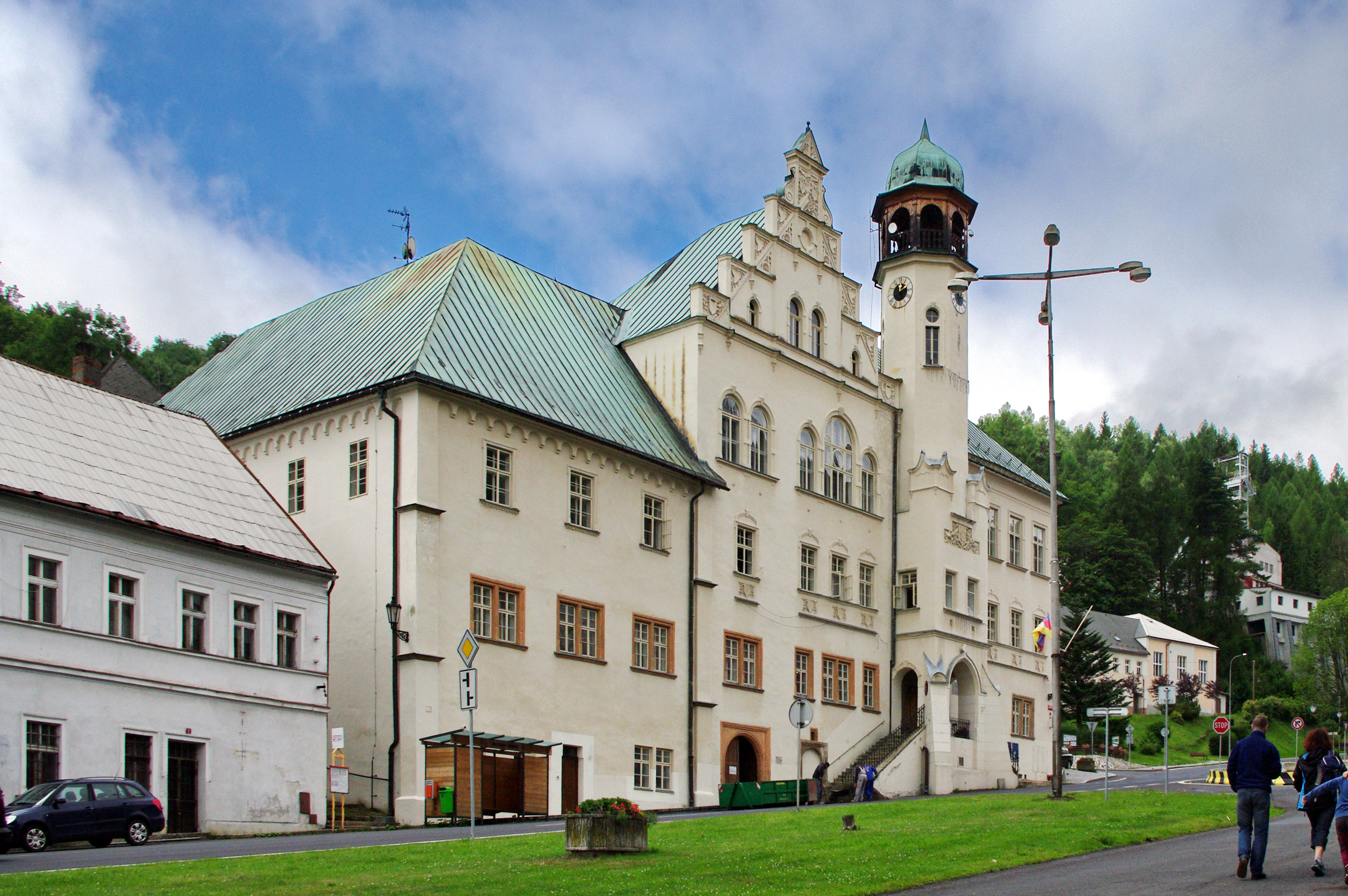
Town hall

The town with the surrounding area forms the Jáchymov Mining Landscape, which is a UNESCO World Heritage Site as part of Ore Mountain Mining Region. There are many technical monuments associated with mining activities, including the Svornost Mine, old mines, landscaping and architecture created as a result of mining.

The historic centre of the town from the 16th century is well preserved and protected as an urban monument zone. It is a comprehensive set of burgher houses and patrician houses with unique portals. Those that have not been preserved in the original Renaissance style have a Renaissance core and have been rebuilt mostly in the Baroque and Neoclassical style. The oldest pharmacy in what is today the Czech Republic was located in the patrician house No. 131. It was opened around 1520.

The history of mining in the area is together with the history of the town is documented in Royal Mint Jáchymov Museum, housed in the former royal mint on the town square. The mint was built in 1533–1536 and its present form is the result of several reconstructions due to fires.

Next to the mint is the town hall. It was originally the house of Hieronymus Schlick, bought by the town in 1531. It was extended in 1538–1544 and rebuilt to its present form with Art Nouveau elements in 1901–1902. in the basement of the town hall there is a unique collection of the Latin school library from the early 16th century.

In the middle of the town square is the Holy Trinity Column dating from 1703.

The Freudenstein Castle (also called Schlick's Castle) was built like most of the town around 1520. Its purpose was the protection of mining and the town. This was probably the last castle in the Czech Republic built as a defensive element and not as an aristocratic residence. In 1634, it completely burned down and remained a ruin. Two towers with part of the fortifications have survived to this day. The so-called Schlick's tower served the town as a signal tower. The second tower, called Prachárna, served the miners as an ammunition store.

=== Sacral monuments ===
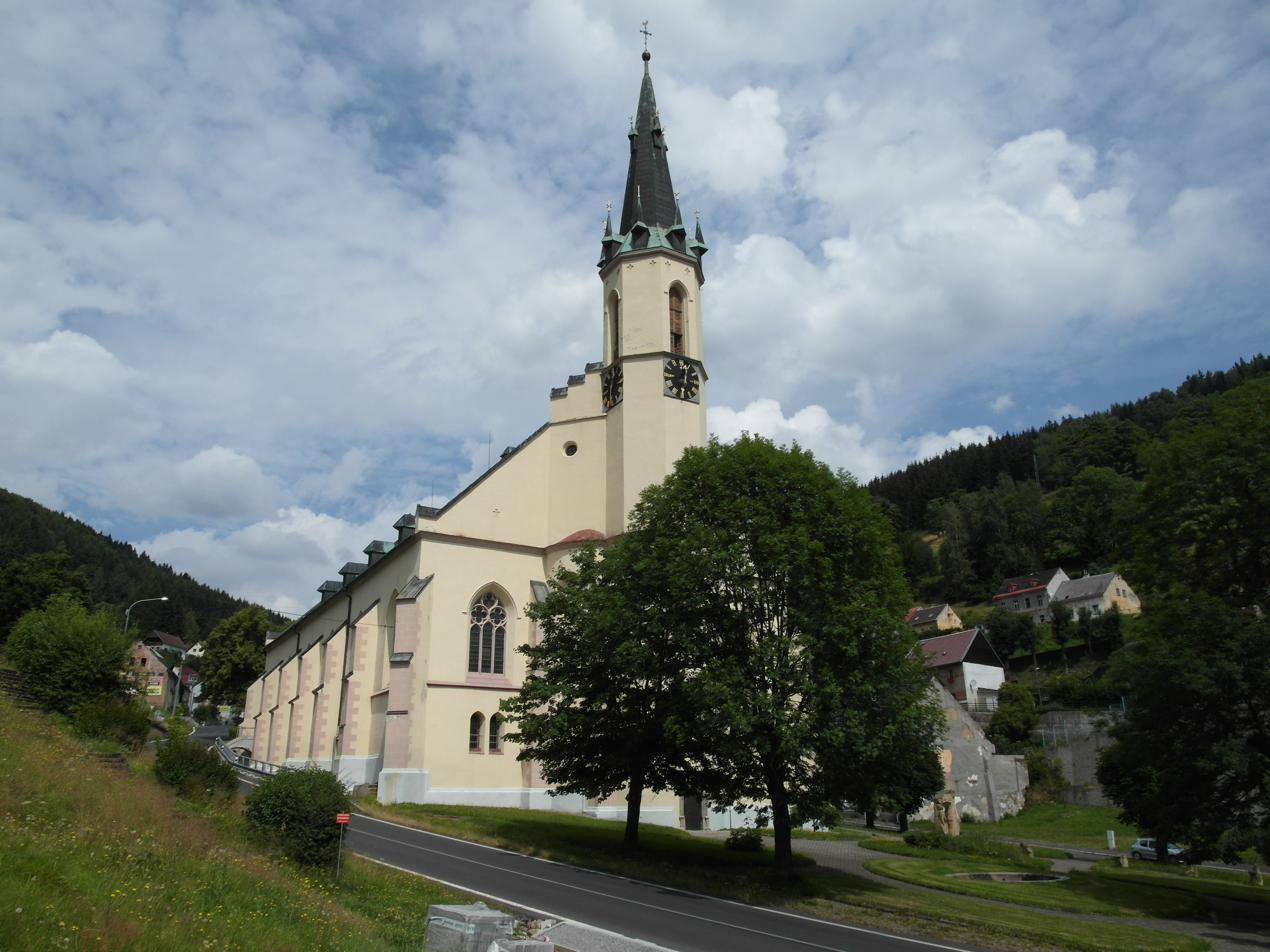
Church of Saint Joachim

The Church of All Saints was built in the early Renaissance style in 1520. It is a valuable building that is partially half-timbered.

The Church of Saint Joachim was built in 1534–1540. It was the first Lutheran church in the Kingdom of Bohemia. From 1624, it was a Roman Catholic church. In 1764–1785, the originally Renaissance building was rebuilt in the Baroque style. After it was damaged by a fire, it was reconstructed in 1874-1876 in the pseudo-Gothic style.

The Evangelical church was built in the pseudo-Renaissance style in 1904 and is also a cultural monument.

=== Spa architecture ===
The oldest spa building is Agricola Spa Centre, built in 1906–1911. One of the landmarks of Jáchymov is the Neoclassical building of Radium Palace Hotel. It dates from 1912. It was one of the most modern hotels of its time, whose guests included Richard Strauss, Tomáš Garrigue Masaryk and Fuad I.

The Monument to Maria Skłodowska-Curie and Pierre Curie was created by sculptor Karel Lidický in 1966. The text on it recalls the discovery of radium in this area.

== Notable people ==
- Georgius Agricola (1494–1555), German scholar, mineralogist and metallurgist
- Johannes Mathesius (1504–1565), German minister and a Lutheran reformer

== Twin towns – sister cities ==
Jáchymov is twinned with:

- Schneeberg, Germany

== See also ==
- Kutná Hora – another Bohemian silver mining town
