= Blackbaud =

American cloud computing provider

Blackbaud, Inc.
- Type: Public
- Traded as: Nasdaq: BLKB; S&P 600 component
- Industry: Software publishing
- Founded: 1981; 45 years ago, in New York City
- Founder: Anthony Bakker
- Headquarters: Charleston, South Carolina, U.S.
- Area served: London, England; Sydney, Australia; Toronto, Canada
- Key people: Mike Gianoni (CEO)
- Revenue: ▲US$1.06 billion (2022)
- Operating income: ▼US$−28 million (2022)
- Net income: ▼US$−45 million (2022)
- Total assets: ▲US$2.99 billion (2022)
- Total equity: ▲US$744 million (2022)
- Number of employees: c. 3,200 (2022)
- Website: www.blackbaud.com

Blackbaud, Inc. is an American cloud computing provider that supports nonprofits, foundations, corporations, education institutions, healthcare organizations, religious organizations, and individual change agents. Its products focus on fundraising, website management, CRM, analytics, financial management, ticketing, and education administration.

Blackbaud's flagship product is a fundraising SQL database software, Raiser's Edge. Revenue from the sale of Raiser's Edge and related services accounted for thirty percent of Blackbaud's total revenue in 2012. Other products and services include Blackbaud Enterprise CRM, Altru, Financial Edge, Education Edge, Blackbaud NetCommunity, eTapestry, Luminate Online, Luminate CRM, Friends Asking Friends. In addition, Blackbaud offers consultancy services to nonprofit organizations.

Blackbaud was founded in 1981 by Anthony Bakker. The company is headquartered in Charleston, South Carolina. Blackbaud went to a remote-first approach for employees in 2021, closing all of its regional offices while keeping its Charleston headquarters.

Mike Gianoni is Blackbaud's CEO.

== History ==
Blackbaud's history traces back to 1981, when Blackbaud founder Anthony Bakker developed a computerized billing system for the Nightingale-Bamford School in Manhattan, New York City. By 1982, Bakker's expanded client list allowed him to quit his day job as a banker, and he incorporated Blackbaud Microsystems. Bakker's new company was headquartered in New York City. Blackbaud's first product was Student Billing, an accounts receivable system geared toward private grade schools. The company's flagship product, The Raiser's Edge, was developed from its Student Billing product.

The company had 75 employees in 1989, when it decided to relocate from New York City due to high operational costs. Blackbaud relocated to Mount Pleasant, South Carolina, with the help of a $750,000 business loan. Of the company's original 75 employees, 30 remained in a support and training office in New York City and 15 relocated to Blackbaud's new South Carolina headquarters. In 1992, the company outgrew its Mount Pleasant headquarters and relocated to North Charleston, South Carolina.

In 1994, Blackbaud converted its software from MS-DOS to Windows 95. This decision led to a sales increase from $19 million in 1995 to $26 million in 1996. During this time Blackbaud acquired multiple MS-DOS-based competitors, including ACOMS of Burlington, Massachusetts; Master Systems Inc. of Pinole, California; and Blackbaud's "chief challenger", Master Software of Indianapolis, Indiana. Blackbaud's acquisition of Master Software doubled its customer base.

Blackbaud began using value-added resellers in 1998, which further expanded the company's customer base. In 2000, Robert Sywolski became CEO of Blackbaud. Sywolski had previously served as CEO of North American operations for Cap Gemini, an international consulting firm.

Blackbaud successfully completed its initial public offering in 2004. Sixteen months later, in November 2005, Marc Chardon replaced Sywolski as Blackbaud CEO. Chardon had previously served as chief financial officer of Microsoft's information worker group, which developed Microsoft Office among other products.

Blackbaud acquired Campagne Associates in 2006. The company added both Target Software and Target Analysis Group in 2007. Target Software developed large-scale database management solutions, while the Target Analysis Group focused primarily on data mining for nonprofits. Later that year, Blackbaud also acquired eTapestry, an online donor management tool.

Blackbaud acquired Kintera in 2008. In 2012, the company acquired Convio.

In early 2013, Blackbaud announced that CEO Marc Chardon would leave the company by the end of that year. Anthony Boor became Blackbaud's interim CEO in August 2013. Boor joined Blackbaud as the company's chief financial officer in 2011. He was credited with leading Blackbaud's acquisition of Convio.

Mike Gianoni was named the new president and CEO for Blackbaud in November 2013.

Blackbaud acquired MicroEdge in 2014 for $160 million. MicroEdge was a software provider to foundations, with about 2,000 customers.

In October 2017, Blackbaud completed a £95m, about $127.4 million, purchase of JustGiving.

In April 2018, Blackbaud acquired Reeher, a St. Paul, Minnesota-based predictive modeling platform for colleges and universities, for $40 million.

In January 2019, Blackbaud acquired YourCause, a software as a service (SaaS) provider focused on increasing corporate giving and volunteering for nonprofits and causes.

In 2022, Blackbaud acquired the education and social impact tech firm EverFi for $750 million.

In December 2025, Blackbaud announced a partnership with Anthropic to provide a fundraising connector for Claude for Nonprofits, an initiative aimed at enhancing how nonprofit organizations use artificial intelligence to increase their impact.

=== Cyber attack ===
In May 2020, Blackbaud fell victim to a cyber attack. Customer data was stolen, and Blackbaud paid the criminals a ransom in exchange for "credible confirmation" that the stolen data was deleted. Blackbaud never verified, however, that the hacker actually deleted the stolen data, according to the FTC complaint.

Over 13,000 customers were affected, including at least twenty universities and charities based in the United Kingdom, the United States, the Netherlands and Canada. Blackbaud externally disclosed the incident in July 2020, weeks after the company learned about the attack. Blackbaud received criticism for paying the hackers' ransom, failure to confirm the deletion of stolen data, and its delay in disclosing the attack, as large data breaches must be reported to data authorities within 72 hours of learning about an incident under European General Data Protection Regulations.

In a September 29, 2020 Form 8-K filing, Blackbaud CFO Tony Boor admitted, contrary to earlier claims, that Blackbaud customer "bank account information, social security numbers, usernames and/or passwords" were compromised.

In their quarterly filing to the SEC in August 2020, the company failed to disclose that donor bank account information and Social Security numbers had been accessed by the attacker. In March 2023, the SEC fined Blackbaud $3 million for this omission.

In October 2023, Blackbaud settled claims arising from the 2020 ransomware attack with 49 US states (excluding California) and the District of Columbia for $49.5M. The agreement also mandates enhanced breach notification processes, extra cybersecurity training, improved encryption, and external compliance evaluations.

In February 2024, the FTC announced a settlement with Blackbaud to improve its data handling. According to Samuel Levine, Director of the FTC’s Bureau of Consumer Protection, the originating complaint was caused by "Blackbaud’s shoddy security and data retention practices which allowed a hacker to obtain sensitive personal data about millions of consumers." The settlement included establishing a data retention policy and deleting unneeded personal information, and to update its data protection practices.

Blackbaud faces class actions from clients in South Carolina and Massachusetts.

== Products ==
Blackbaud creates and acquires software meant to help nonprofits with Customer Relationship Management (CRM), marketing campaigns, fundraising, finance and accounting, and analytics.

Blackbaud offers several distinct CRM products serving nonprofit organizations of varying sizes and operational complexity. These include The Raiser's Edge NXT, Blackbaud CRM, and Luminate CRM. The Raiser's Edge NXT is a cloud-based fundraising CRM focused on donor management and engagement.

Blackbaud also provides Financial Edge NXT, a cloud-based fund accounting system.

== Philanthropy ==
Blackbaud has an extensive corporate citizenship and philanthropy program. Volunteer for Vacation is an employee initiative, where the company gives paid vacation to employees who participate in volunteer community service. The company's Reward your Passion initiative allows employees to apply for company-funded grants that help a charity of their choice. In 2013, the company expanded its grant program to include locations beyond its Charleston, South Carolina headquarters. Later that year, Blackbaud launched Business Doing Good, a website that is focused on providing information for small and medium-sized businesses to create their own corporate philanthropy programs. The company also hosts volunteer fairs and other community service events throughout the year.
