= Mining community =

Community that houses miners

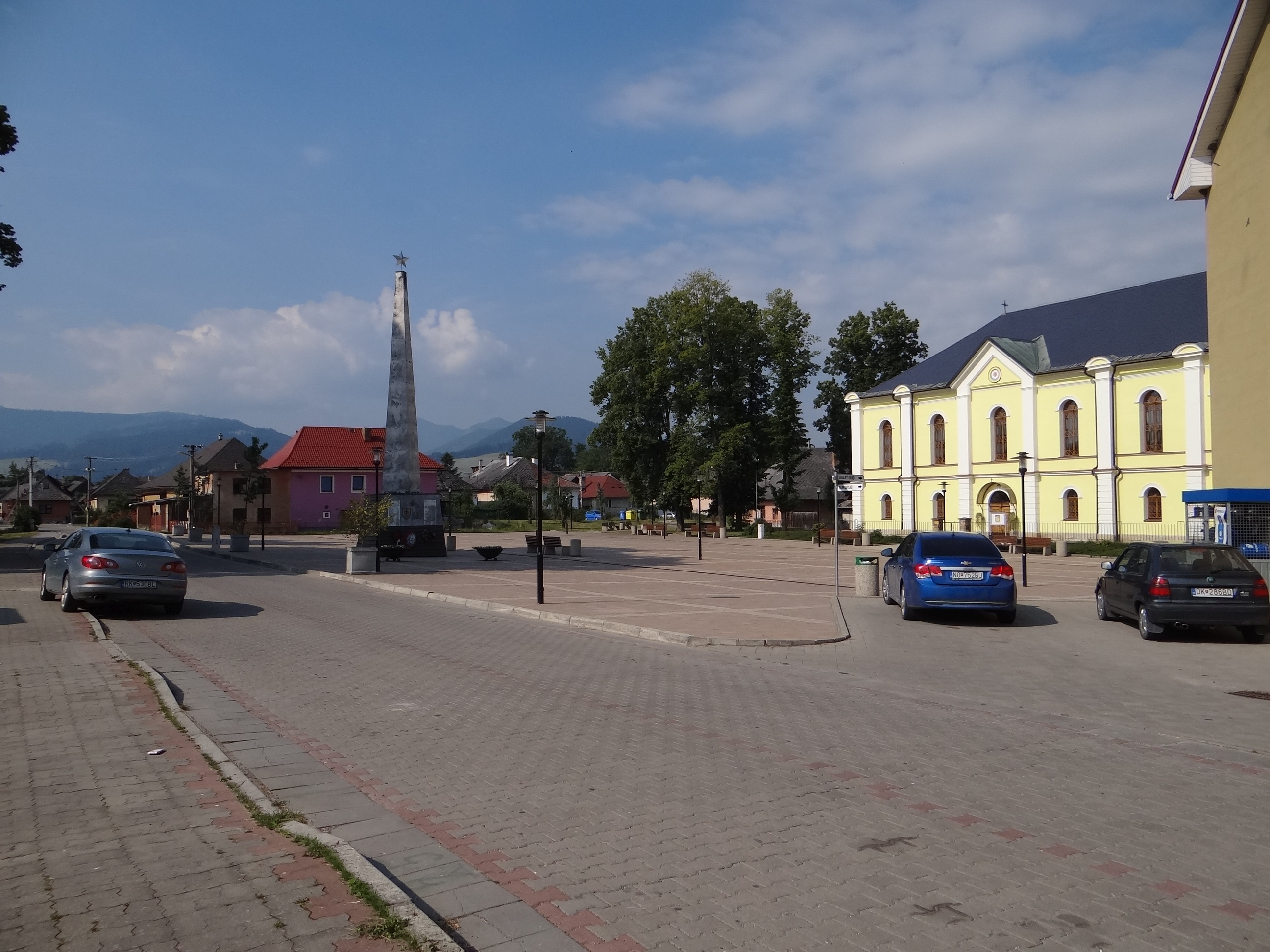
Partizánska Ľupča in Slovakia. Now a village with 1300 inhabitants but in 14th-19th centuries an important mining town with more than 4000. Several houses still have an urban character.

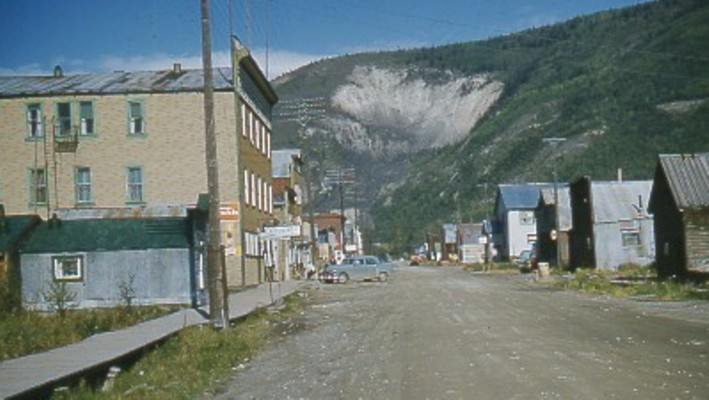
Dawson City, Yukon, Canada, in 1957.

A mining community, also known as a mining town or a mining camp, is a community that houses miners. Mining communities are usually created around a mine or a quarry.

== Historical mining communities ==
=== Australia ===
- Ballarat, Victoria
- Bendigo, Victoria
- Kalgoorlie, Western Australia
- Menzies, Western Australia

=== Austria-Hungary ===
Austrian Lands

- Idrija, today in Slovenia
- Eisenerz in Styria
- Hall in Tirol in Tyrol
- Schwaz in Tyrol

Lower Hungarian mining towns

- Kremnitz, today Kremnica in Slovakia
- Schemnitz, today Banská Štiavnica in Slovakia
- Neusohl, today Banská Bystrica in Slovakia
- Königsberg, today Nová Baňa in Slovakia
- Libethen, today Ľubietová in Slovakia
- Pukkanz, today Pukanec in Slovakia
- Dilln, today Banská Belá in Slovakia

Upper Hungarian mining towns

- Göllnitz, today Gelnica in Slovakia
- Rosenau, today Rožňava in Slovakia
- Zipser Neudorf, today Spišská Nová Ves in Slovakia
- Schmöllnitz, today Smolník in Slovakia
- Jossau, today Jasov in Slovakia
- Ruda, today Rudabánya in Hungary
- Telken, today Telkibánya in Hungary

Other Hungarian mining towns

- Deutsch Liptsch, today Partizánska Ľupča in Slovakia

=== Bosnia and Herzegovina ===
- Banovići
- Kakanj
- Tuzla
- Zenica

=== Canada ===
- Cobalt, Ontario
- Glace Bay, Nova Scotia
- Dawson City, Yukon
- Lynn Lake, Manitoba
- Red Lake, Ontario
- Thompson, Manitoba
- Timmins, Ontario
- Flin Flon, Manitoba

=== Czech Republic ===
(German name in parentheses)

- Abertamy (Abertham)
- Adamov (Adamstadt)
- Andělská Hora (Engelsberg)
- Boží Dar (Gottesgab)
- Branná (Goldenstein)
- Hartmanice (Hartmanitz)
- Hora Svaté Kateřiny (Sankt Katharinaberg)
- Hora Svatého Šebestiána (Sebastiansberg)
- Horní Blatná (Platten)
- Horní Město (Bergstadt)
- Horní Slavkov (Schlaggenwald)
- Hrob (Klostergrab)
- Hůrky (Adamsfreiheit), today part of Nová Bystřice
- Jáchymov (Sankt Joachimsthal, Joachimsthal)
- Janov (Johannesthal)
- Jihlava (Iglau)
- Jílové u Prahy (Eule)
- Jiřetín pod Jedlovou (Sankt Georgenthal)
- Kašperské Hory (Bergreichenstein)
- Krajková (Gossengrün)
- Krásno (Schönfeld)
- Krupka (Graupen)
- Kutná Hora (Kuttenberg)
- Litrbachy (Lauterbach) – in the area of Rovná, no longer exists
- Loučná pod Klínovcem (Böhmisch Wiesenthal)
- Měděnec (Kupferberg)
- Místo (Platz)
- Nové Město pod Smrkem (Neustadt an der Tafelfichte)
- Oloví (Bleistadt)
- Pernink (Bärringen)
- Planá (Plan)
- Přebuz (Frühbuß)
- Přísečnice (Preßnitz) – in the area of Kryštofovy Hamry, no longer exists
- Rejštejn (Unterreichenstein)
- Rudolfov (Rudolfstadt)
- Staré Město (Goldeck, Altstadt)
- Stříbrné Hory (Silberberg), today part of Nalžovské Hory
- Stříbro (Mies)
- Vodňany (Wodnian)
- Výsluní (Sonnenberg)
- Zlaté Hory (Zuckmantel)

=== Finland ===
- Pargas

=== Germany ===
In Germany, a Bergstadt refers to a settlement near mineral deposits vested with town privileges, Bergregal rights and tax exemption, in order to promote the economic development of the mining region.

==== Baden-Württemberg ====
- Freudenstadt
- Prinzbach

==== Bavaria ====
- Auerbach in der Oberpfalz
- Pegnitz (town)
- Bodenmais
- Lam
- Fichtelberg (Upper Franconia)

==== Lower Saxony ====
- Altenau
- Bad Grund
- Clausthal
- Zellerfeld
- Lautenthal
- Obernkirchen
- Sankt Andreasberg
- Wildemann

==== North Rhine-Westphalia ====
- Lüdenscheid

==== Saxony ====
- Altenberg
- Annaberg
- Buchholz
- Berggießhübel
- Bleiberg (near Frankenberg/Sa.) (town no longer exists)
- Brand
- Ehrenfriedersdorf
- Eibenstock
- Elterlein
- Ernstthal
- Freiberg
- Geyer
- Glashütte (Saxony)
- Hohenstein
- Johanngeorgenstadt
- Lengefeld
- Lößnitz
- Marienberg, Saxony
- Neustädtel
- Oberwiesenthal
- Oederan
- Scheibenberg
- Schneeberg
- Schwarzenberg/Erzgeb.
- Thum
- Voigtsberg
- Wolkenstein
- Zschopau
- Zwönitz

==== Saxony-Anhalt ====
- Eisleben
- Sangerhausen

==== Thuringia ====
- Ilmenau
- Ruhla
- Suhl
- Sondershausen

=== Hong Kong ===
- Ma On Shan Village

=== Indonesia ===
- Sawahlunto
- Sorowako
- Tanjung Enim
- Tembagapura

=== Nigeria ===
- Enugu
- Jos

=== Norway ===
- Kongsberg (formerly)
- Røros

=== Poland ===
- Georgenberg (now Miasteczko Śląskie)
- Goldberg, (now Złotoryja)
- Groß Salze, (now Wieliczka)
- Nikolstadt, (now Mikołajowice)
- Salzberg, (now Bochnia)
- Wilhelmstal, (now Bolesławów)

=== Slovenia ===
- Idrija
- Velenje
- Trbovlje

=== South Korea ===
- Gangwon Province
  - Jeongseon County
  - Taebaek City
  - Samcheok City
  - Yeongwol County
- North Gyeongsang Province
  - Sangju City
  - Mungyeong City
  - Uljin County
  - Yeongju City
  - Bonghwa County

=== United States ===
==== Alaska ====
- Juneau
- Skagway

==== Arizona ====
- Bisbee
- Cerro Colorado
- Christmas
- Contention City
- Jerome
- Klondyke
- Ruby
- Tombstone
- Tumacacori

==== California ====
- Calico, San Bernardino Co.
- Columbia

==== Colorado ====
- Central City
- Cripple Creek
- Denver
- Idaho Springs
- Leadville
- Tercio
- Victor

==== Idaho ====
- Custer
- Idaho City

==== Iowa ====
- Buxton
- Centerville
- Coalville
- Confidence
- Lucas
- Everist
- Muchakinock
- Mystic
- Numa
- Seymour
- What Cheer

==== Michigan ====
- Bessemer
- Calumet
- Houghton
- Ironwood
- Ishpeming
- Negaunee
- Wakefield
- White Pine

==== Minnesota ====
- Aurora
- Babbitt
- Biwabik
- Bovey
- Buhl
- Calumet
- Chisholm
- Coleraine
- Crosby
- Cuyuna
- Ely
- Eveleth
- Gilbert
- Hibbing
- Hoyt Lakes
- Ironton
- Keewatin
- Kinney
- Marble
- McKinley
- Mountain Iron
- Nashwauk
- Riverton
- Soudan
- Taconite
- Trommald
- Virginia

==== Montana ====
- Bannack (ghost town)
- Butte
- Colstrip
- Virginia City

==== Nevada ====
- Austin
- Eureka
- Goldfield
- Jarbidge
- Pioche
- Tonopah
- Virginia City

==== New Mexico ====
- Pinos Altos
- Silver City

==== South Dakota ====
- Deadwood

==== Utah ====
- Dragon
- Eureka
- Frisco
- Park City
- Silver Reef
- Spring Canyon

==== Wisconsin ====
- Hurley

== See also ==
- Boomtown
- Coal town
- Man camp – temporary housing for resource extraction
- Mission (station)
- Pit village

== Citations ==
- Sherman, James E; Barbara H. Sherman (1969). Ghost Towns of Arizona. University of Oklahoma Press. ISBN 0-8061-0843-6. Book features pg. 147 about what is necessary for a settlement to have in order to be considered a "mining town".
