= Ostrov (administrative district) =

District of Karlovy Vary, Czech Republic

Administrative district of the municipality with extended powers of Ostrov Správní obvod obce s rozšířenou působností Ostrov
- Administrative district of municipality with extended powers
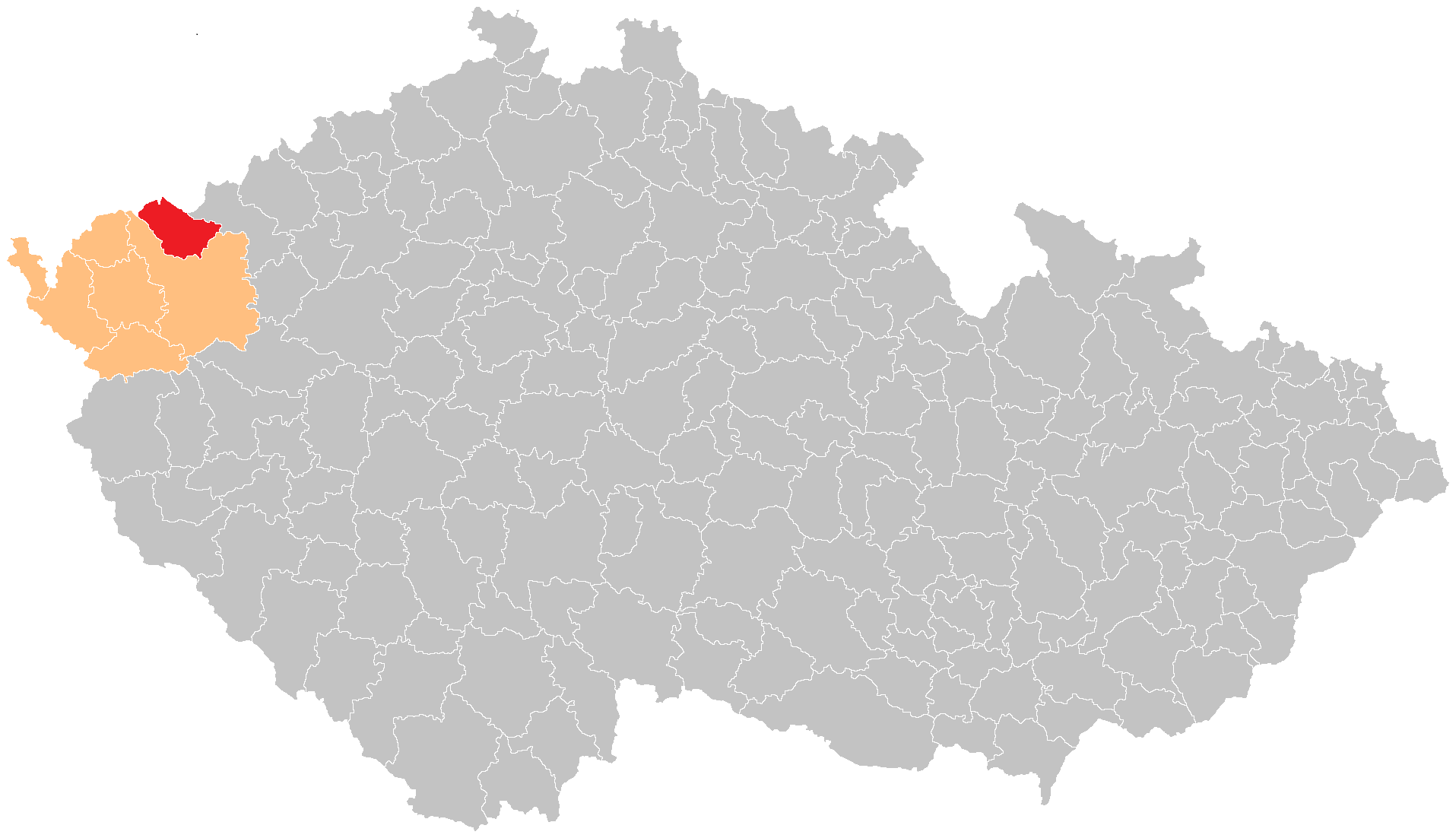
- Location in the Karlovy Vary Region within the Czech Republic
- Coordinates: 50°20′N 12°56′E
- Country: Czech Republic
- Region: Karlovy Vary
- District: Karlovy Vary
- Municipality with extended powers: Ostrov

Area
  - Total: 339.29 km^{2} (131.00 sq mi)

Population (2024)
  - Total: 26,512
  - Density: 78.140/km^{2} (202.38/sq mi)
- Time zone: UTC+1 (CET)
  - Summer (DST): UTC+2 (CEST)
- Municipalities: 15
- * Cities and towns: 6
- * Market towns: 0

The administrative district of the municipality with extended powers of Ostrov (abbreviated AD MEP Ostrov; Czech: Správní obvod obce s rozšířenou působností Ostrov, SO ORP Ostrov) is an administrative district of municipality with extended powers in Karlovy Vary District in the Karlovy Vary Region of the Czech Republic. It has existed since 1 January 2003, when the districts were replaced administratively. It includes 15 municipalities which have a combined population of over 26,000.

== Municipalities ==
Cities and towns are in bold.

Municipality	Population	Area (km^{2)}	Density
**Abertamy**	848	8.70	97
**Boží Dar**	263	37.91	6.9
Doupovské Hradiště	162	20.90	7.8
Hájek	643	8.75	73
**Horní Blatná**	382	5.63	68
**Hroznětín**	2,107	23.79	89
**Jáchymov**	2,361	50.77	47
Krásný Les	347	22.71	15
Merklín	871	23.41	37
**Ostrov**	15,825	50.41	313
Pernink	595	15.71	38
Potůčky	427	32.00	13
Stráž nad Ohří	560	29.24	19
Velichov	496	2.35	211
Vojkovice	625	7.03	89

== Demographics ==
Historical population

Year	Pop.	±%
1869	31,057	—
1880	33,135	+6.7%
1890	34,721	+4.8%
1900	37,553	+8.2%
1910	39,462	+5.1%

Year	Pop.	±%
1921	35,201	−10.8%
1930	37,933	+7.8%
1950	22,717	−40.1%
1961	31,646	+39.3%
1970	30,148	−4.7%

Year	Pop.	±%
1980	30,600	+1.5%
1991	27,684	−9.5%
2001	28,536	+3.1%
2011	29,316	+2.7%
2021	26,865	−8.4%

Source: Censuses
