= Myslivny =

- Locality
- Interactive map of Myslivny
- Coordinates: 50°24′54″N 12°52′09″E
- Country: Czech Republic
- Region: Karlovy Vary
- District: Karlovy Vary
- Municipality: Boží Dar
- Elevation: 969 m (3,179 ft)

Myslivny (German: Försterhäuser) is a locality within the territory of Boží Dar in the Czech Republic. It is formed by few scattered houses and the Myslivny Reservoir.

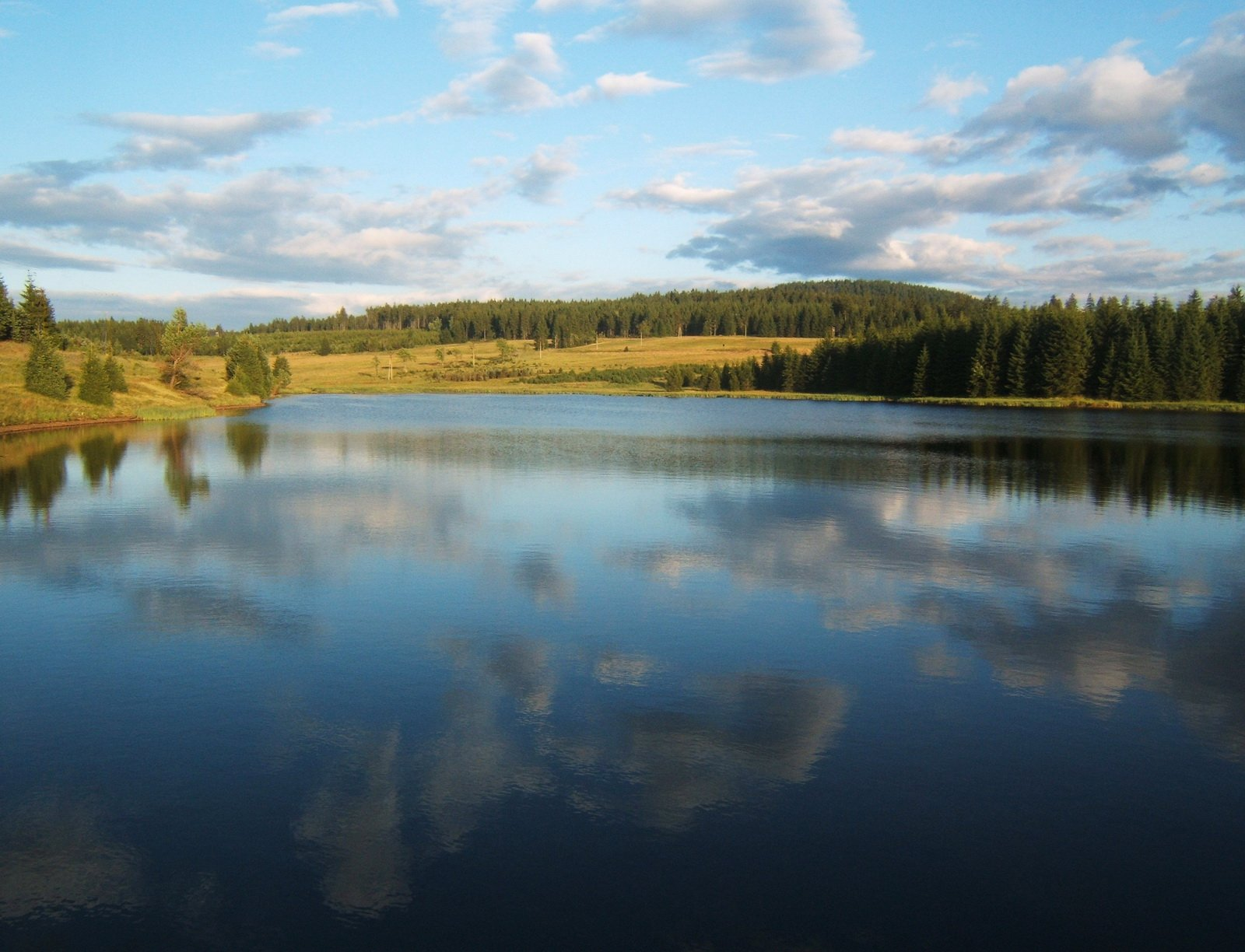
Myslivny Reservoir

== Location ==
Myslivny lies at a height of 950–970 metres above the sea level on the highlands of the upper Ore Mountains. The locality, which is 2 kilometres northwest of the Božídarský Špičák mountain on the Černá creek between Boží Dar and Horní Blatná is surrounded by high forest and was formerly a popular summer retreat and winter sports resort.

== History ==
Until the 16th century, the place belonged to Barony of Schwarzenberg.

The population made their living by farming, forestry and bobbin lacemaking. Between 1929 and 1932, Greek writer Nikos Kazantzakis and his second wife stayed for several months, vacationing and writing. Following the expulsion of German-speaking people in 1946, many houses were torn down.

== Literature ==
- Bruno Wähner: Führer durch die nähere und weitere Umgebung von Gottesgab, Böhm.-Leipa, o.J., pp. 37–38.
