= Herta Lindner =

German member of the resistance to Nazism (1920–1943)

Herta Lindner

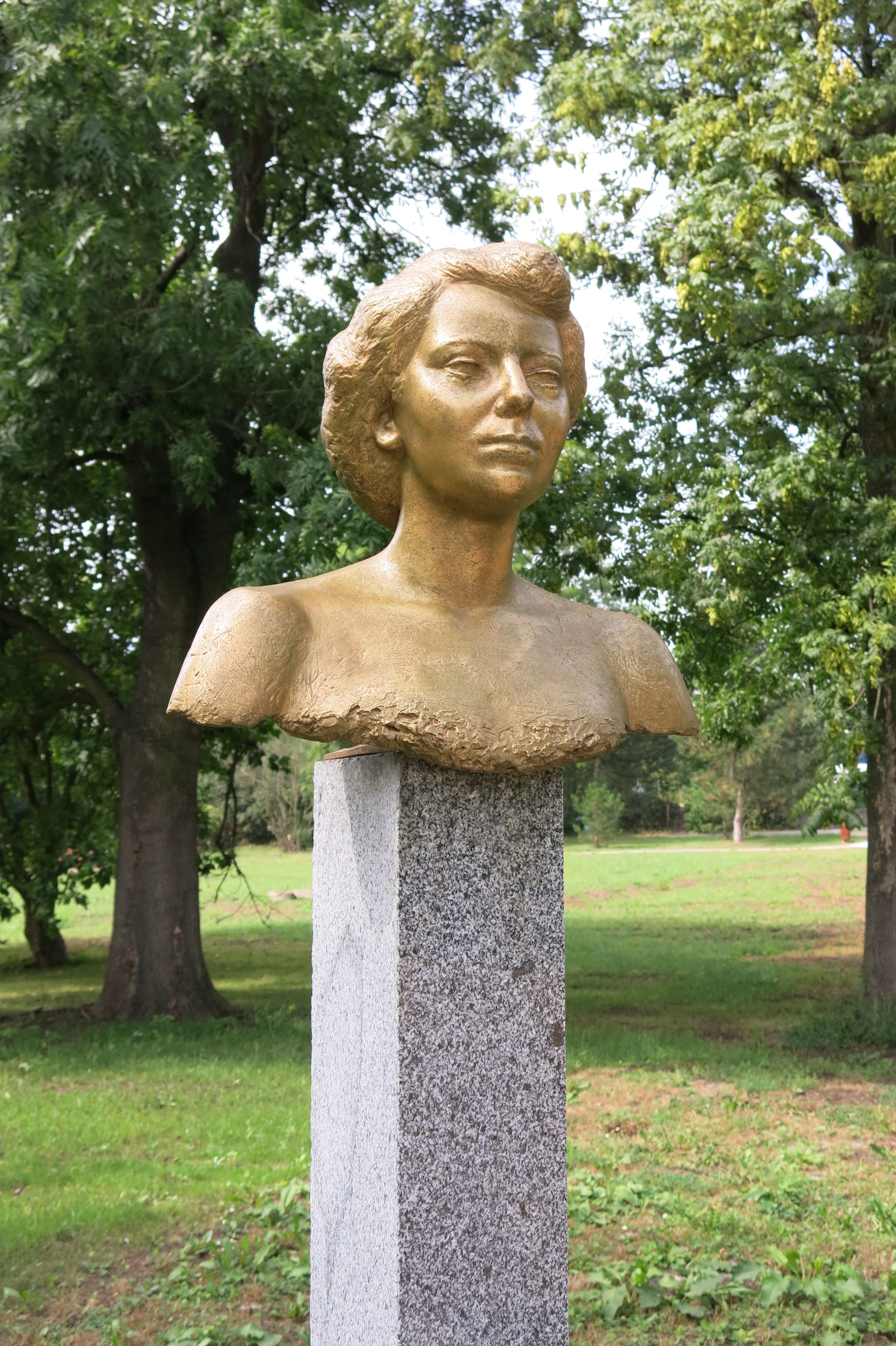
Bust of Herta Lindner in Bohosudov by sculptor Pavel Karták

Herta Lindner (3 November 1920 – 29 March 1943) was a member of the German resistance against Nazism in occupied Czechoslovakia.

== Biography ==
Lindner was born on 3 November 1920 to a German father and Czech mother in Bohosudov, Czechoslovakia (now part of Krupka in the Czech Republic). She joined the Socialist Youth of Germany – Falcons at a young age. Lindner and her family opposed the Sudeten German Party.

During the German occupation of Czechoslovakia Lindner lived in Prague and Dresden but returned in 1941 to her family. She worked as salesclerk in Teplice. Lindner was a founding member of the Lindenbrüder Hohenstein climbing club, which served as a cover for illegal anti-Nazi activities.

Herta Lindner and her father were arrested by the SS on 27 November 1941 for their political activities. They were held in Most and later brought to Berlin, where Herta was sentenced to death for high treason in November 1942. She was executed at Plötzensee Prison on 29 March 1943. Her father was executed two weeks later.
