= Pernink =

- Municipality
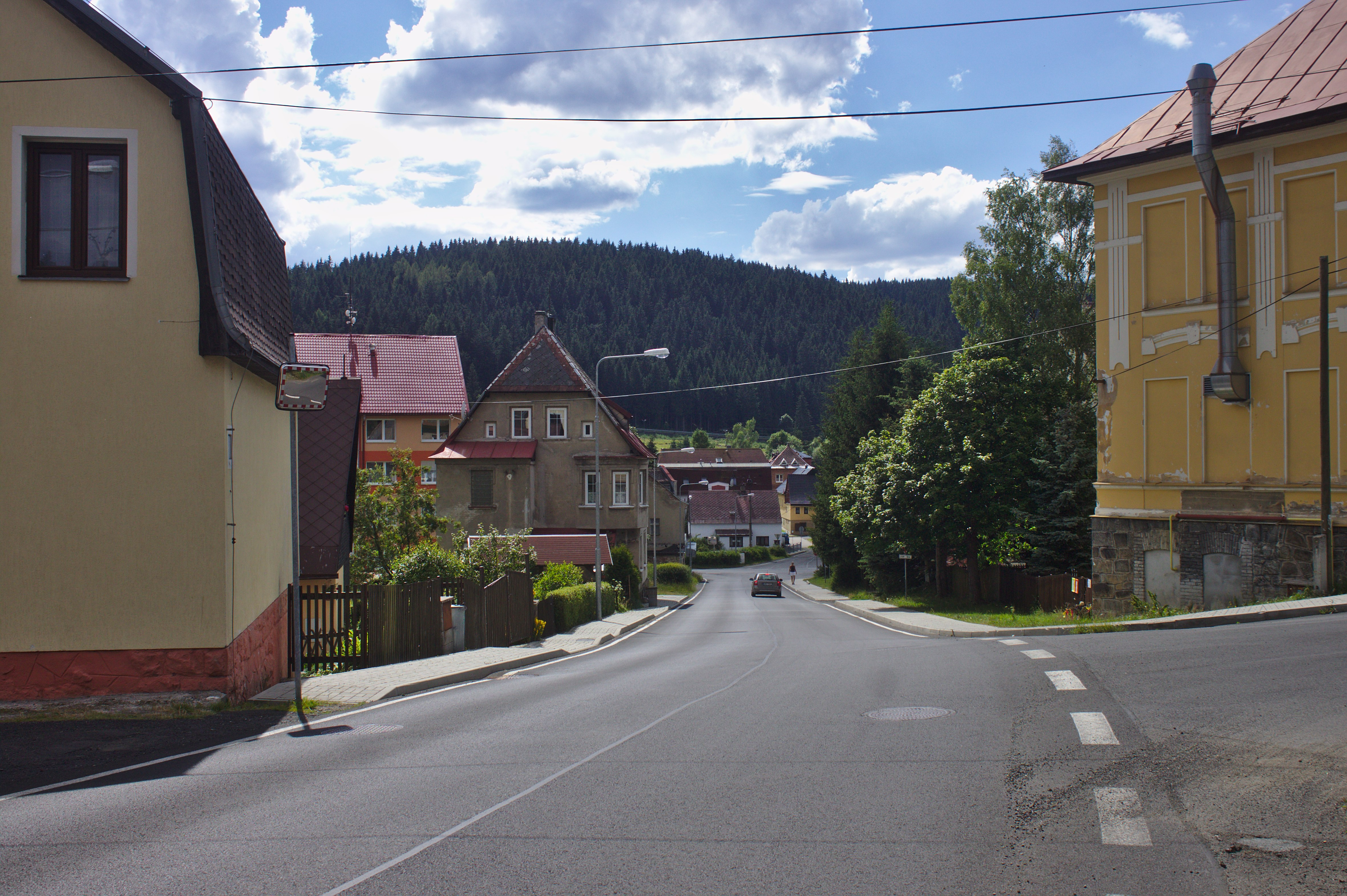
- Main street

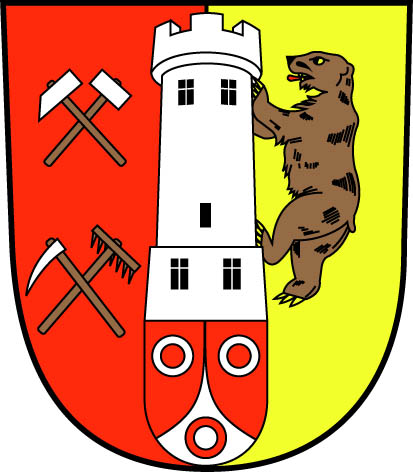
- Flag Coat of arms

- Location in the Czech Republic
- Coordinates: 50°21′57″N 12°47′2″E
- Country: Czech Republic
- Region: Karlovy Vary
- District: Karlovy Vary
- First mentioned: 1532

Area
  - Total: 15.71 km^{2} (6.07 sq mi)
- Elevation: 840 m (2,760 ft)

Population (2026-01-01)
  - Total: 581
  - Density: 37.0/km^{2} (95.8/sq mi)
- Time zone: UTC+1 (CET)
  - Summer (DST): UTC+2 (CEST)
- Postal code: 362 36
- Website: www.pernink.eu

Pernink (German: Bärringen) is a municipality and village in Karlovy Vary District in the Karlovy Vary Region of the Czech Republic. It has about 600 inhabitants.

== Administrative division ==
Pernink consists of three municipal parts (in brackets population according to the 2021 census):

- Pernink (589)
- Bludná (0)
- Rybná (8)

== Etymology ==
The name Pernink was derived from the initial German name of the settlement, which was Peringer. The village was named after someone with the surname Peringer. The surname denoted someone who came from a place called Peringen or Beringer. In the 19th century, the settlement began to be called Bärringen in German.

== Geography ==
Pernink is located about 15 kilometres (9 mi) north of Karlovy Vary. It lies in the Ore Mountains. The highest point is at 1,033 m (3,389 ft) above sea level. The village is situated in the valley of the Bílá Bystřice Stream.

== History ==
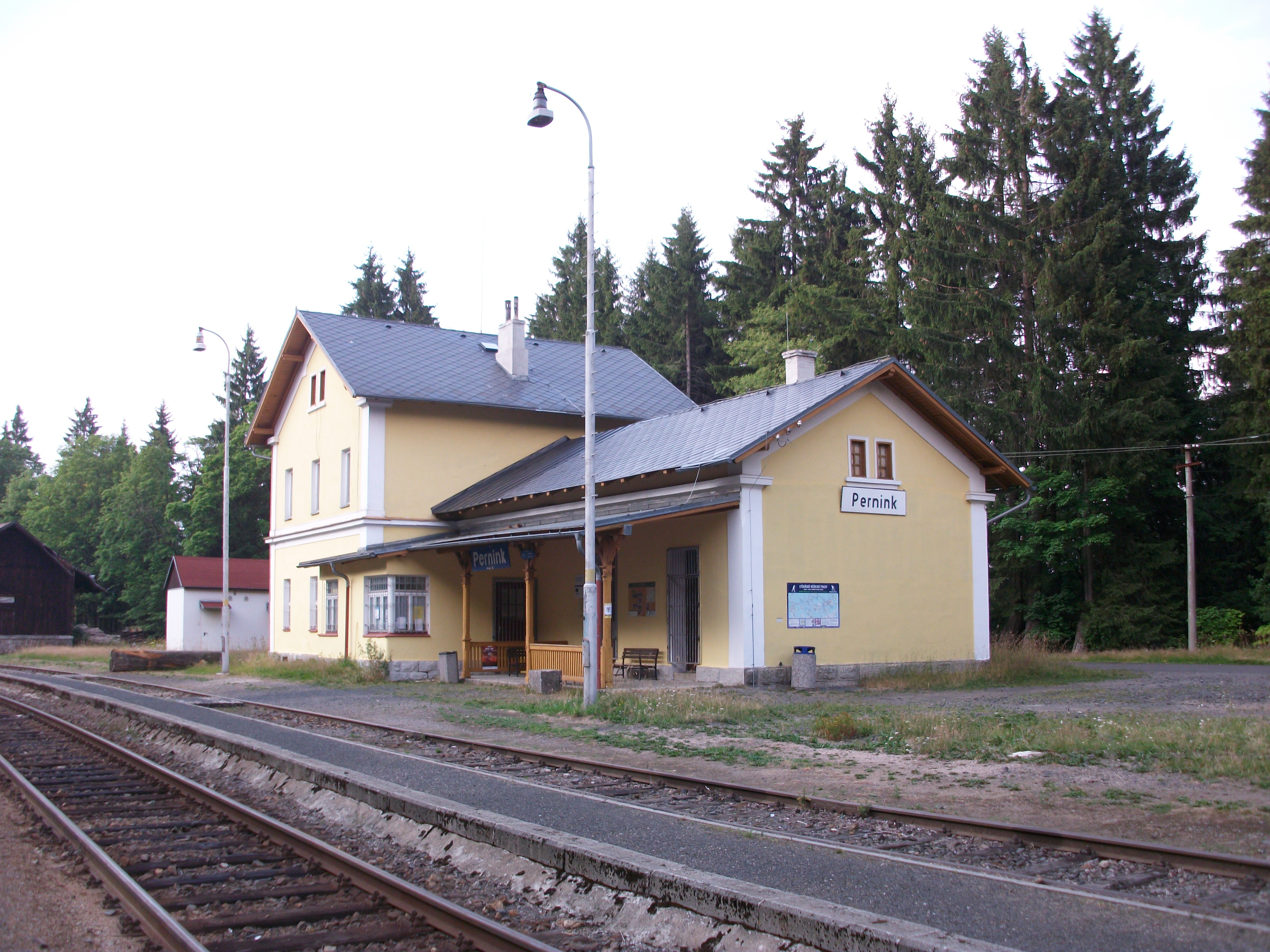
Railway station

At the beginning of the 16th century, mining pioneers settled in the area which was dominated by dense forest at the time. According to legend, a bear found ore here. The legend is preserved in the coat of arms and also in the German name (Bär = 'bear'). In 1532, the settlement was promoted to a mining town by the then owner of the estate, Jindřich Schlick. The town received further privileges in 1559 and 1562.

The predominant industry was the mining of silver and tin. The area between Pernink, Abertamy and Horní Blatná used to be called "silver triangle". Following the Thirty Years' War, most of the Protestant miners left to neighbouring Saxony. Mining was gradually replaced by forestry and crafts.

In the first half of the 19th century, Adalbert Meinl founded a textile factory. Small workshops for the manufacturing of wooden and iron products were established. In 1843, the town had almost 1,800 residents living in 207 houses. The economic situation was bolstered by the opening of the railway in 1899. In the inter-war period, the number of residents rose to approximately 3,500.

From 1938 to 1945, it was annexed by Nazi Germany and administered as part of the Reichsgau Sudetenland. After World War II, the German-speaking inhabitants were expelled (almost 90% of the population). The area was resettled with hundreds of new Czech settlers in 1946. Following the closure of uranium mines in Jáchymov, the number of residents decreased.

== Demographics ==
Historical population

Year	Pop.	±%
1869	2,219	—
1880	2,444	+10.1%
1890	2,544	+4.1%
1900	2,860	+12.4%
1910	3,019	+5.6%

Year	Pop.	±%
1921	2,506	−17.0%
1930	3,023	+20.6%
1950	1,376	−54.5%
1961	1,253	−8.9%
1970	927	−26.0%

Year	Pop.	±%
1980	794	−14.3%
1991	709	−10.7%
2001	904	+27.5%
2011	722	−20.1%
2021	597	−17.3%

Source: Censuses

== Economy ==
Today, Pernink lives mainly from tourism. The municipality is a centre of winter and summer sports.

== Transport ==
Pernink is located on the Karlovy Vary–Johanngeorgenstadt railway. The local railway station is the second highest in the Czech Republic with an elevation of 902 metres (2,959 ft).

== Sights ==
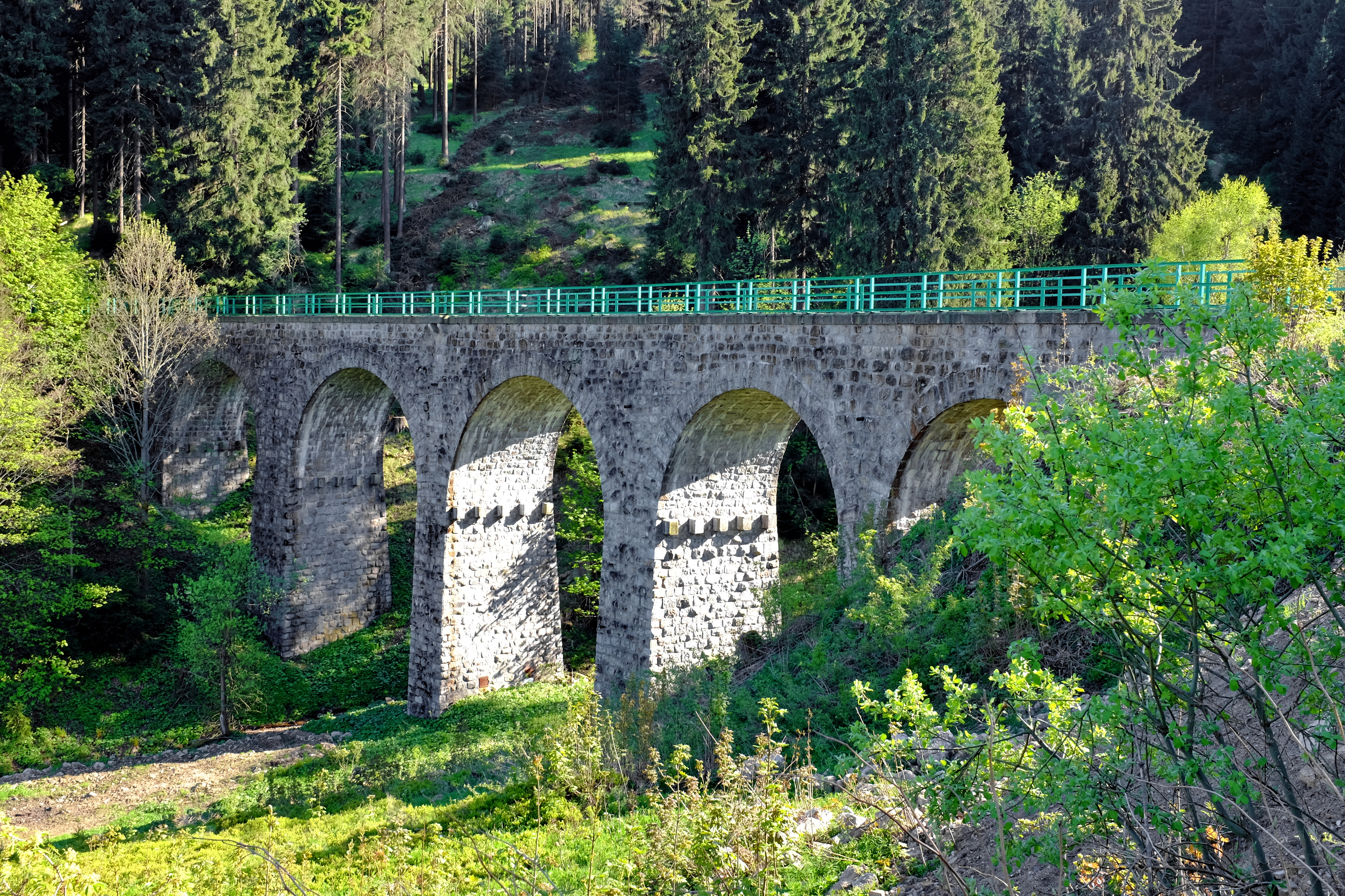
Pernink Viaduct

The Church of the Holy Trinity was built in 1714–1716. It has a tower in the Alpine style.

The viaduct in Pernink is at the highest altitude in the country. It is a significant technical monument.

The former Bludná mining district is a part of the Ore Mountain Mining Region, protected as a UNESCO World Heritage Site.

== Notable people ==
- Rudolf Kippenhahn (1926–2020), German astrophysicist
- Rudolf Höhnl (born 1946), ski jumper
