= Ore Mountain Mining Region =

UNESCO World Heritage Site in the Czech Republic and Germany

Erzgebirge/Krušnohoří Mining Region
UNESCO World Heritage Site
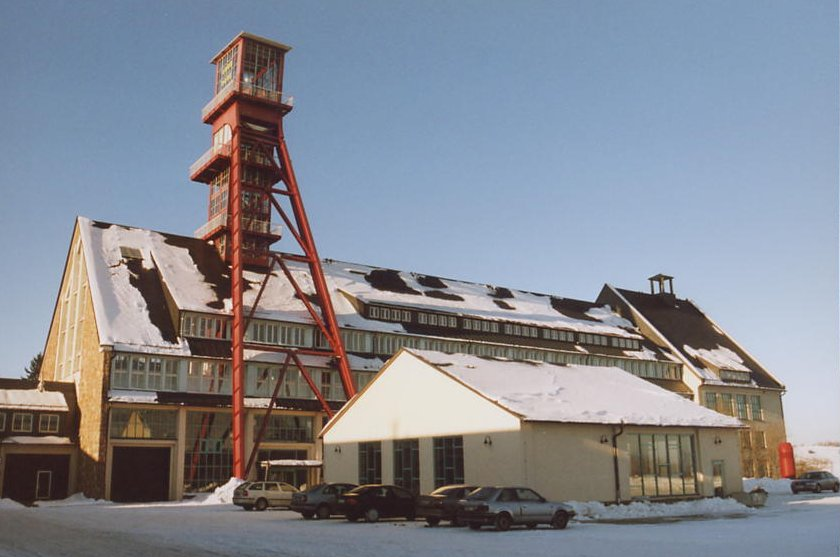

- Location within Czech Republic
- Location: Czech Republic and Germany
- Criteria: Cultural: (ii), (iii), (iv)
- Reference: 1478
- Inscription: 2019 (43rd Session)
- Area: 6,766.057 ha (16,719.29 acres)
- Buffer zone: 13,017.791 ha (32,167.66 acres)
- Coordinates: 50°24′23.5″N 12°50′14″E

The Ore Mountain Mining Region (officially Erzgebirge/Krušnohoří Mining Region; German: Montanregion Erzgebirge, Czech: Hornický region Erzgebirge/Krušnohoří) is an industrial heritage landscape, over 800 years old, in the border region of the Ore Mountains between the German state of Saxony and North Bohemia in the Czech Republic. It is characterised by a plethora of historic, largely original, monuments to technology, as well as numerous individual monuments and collections related to the historic mining industry of the region. On 6 July 2019, the Erzgebirge/Krušnohoří Mining Region was inscribed as a UNESCO World Heritage Site, because of its exceptional testimony to the advancement of mining technology over the past 800 years.

== Description ==
The Ore Mountain Mining Region is a region roughly 95 kilometres (59 mi) long and 45 kilometres (28 mi) wide, on the border of Germany and the Czech Republic, containing a large density of historical mining sites and monuments. Because of the intensity and continuous nature of the mining in the region, the entire landscape is heavily influenced by mining, from transportation to water supply and urban planning. The region includes many well-reserved relics from derelict mines, including the mines themselves, mine shafts, smelters, and hammer mills.

The World Heritage Site comprises 22 mining sites and monuments, 17 in Germany and 5 in the Czech Republic. The largest of them is Abertamy – Boží Dar – Horní Blatná – Mining Landscape with an area of 2,680 ha (6,600 acres). The list includes:

Germany

- Dippoldiswalde Medieval Silver Mines
- Altenberg-Zinnwald Mining Landscape
- Lauenstein Administrative Centre
- Freiberg Mining Landscape
- Hoher Forst Mining Landscape
- Schneeberg Mining Landscape
- Schindlers Werk Smalt Works
- Annaberg-Frohnau Mining Landscape
- Pöhlberg Mining Landscape
- Buchholz Mining Landscape
- Marienberg Mining Town
- Lauta Mining Landscape
- Ehrenfriedersdorf Mining Landscape
- Grünthal Silver-Copper Liquation Works
- Eibenstock Mining Landscape
- Rother Berg Mining Landscape
- Uranium Mining Landscape

Czech Republic

- Jáchymov Mining Landscape
- Abertamy – Boží Dar – Horní Blatná – Mining Landscape
- The Red Tower of Death in Ostrov
- Krupka Mining Landscape
- Mědník Hill Mining Landscape in Měděnec

== History ==
From the first discovery of silver ore in 1168 in Christiansdorf in the territory of the present-day borough of Freiberg, which is part of the Freiberg Mining Field, mining was carried out uninterruptedly in the Ore Mountains until 1990. During that time, several different metals were extracted from the region. Silver was the first metal mined in the region (particularly around Freiberg), and the region was a world-leading producer of silver ore during the 14th through 16th centuries. On the Bohemian side of the mountains, Krupka grew into a prominent mining town, extracting silver, tin, and later iron, lead, copper, and mercury. After the superficial deposits of silver and tin began to decline in the 16th century, the region became famous as the world producer of cobalt, a status it maintained until the mid-18th century. Finally, anthracite and uranium were extracted in the 19th and 20th century, and were engines for the economic development of Saxony. Today deposits of indium, tungsten, tin and lithium are being investigated for their economic potential.

== Gallery ==
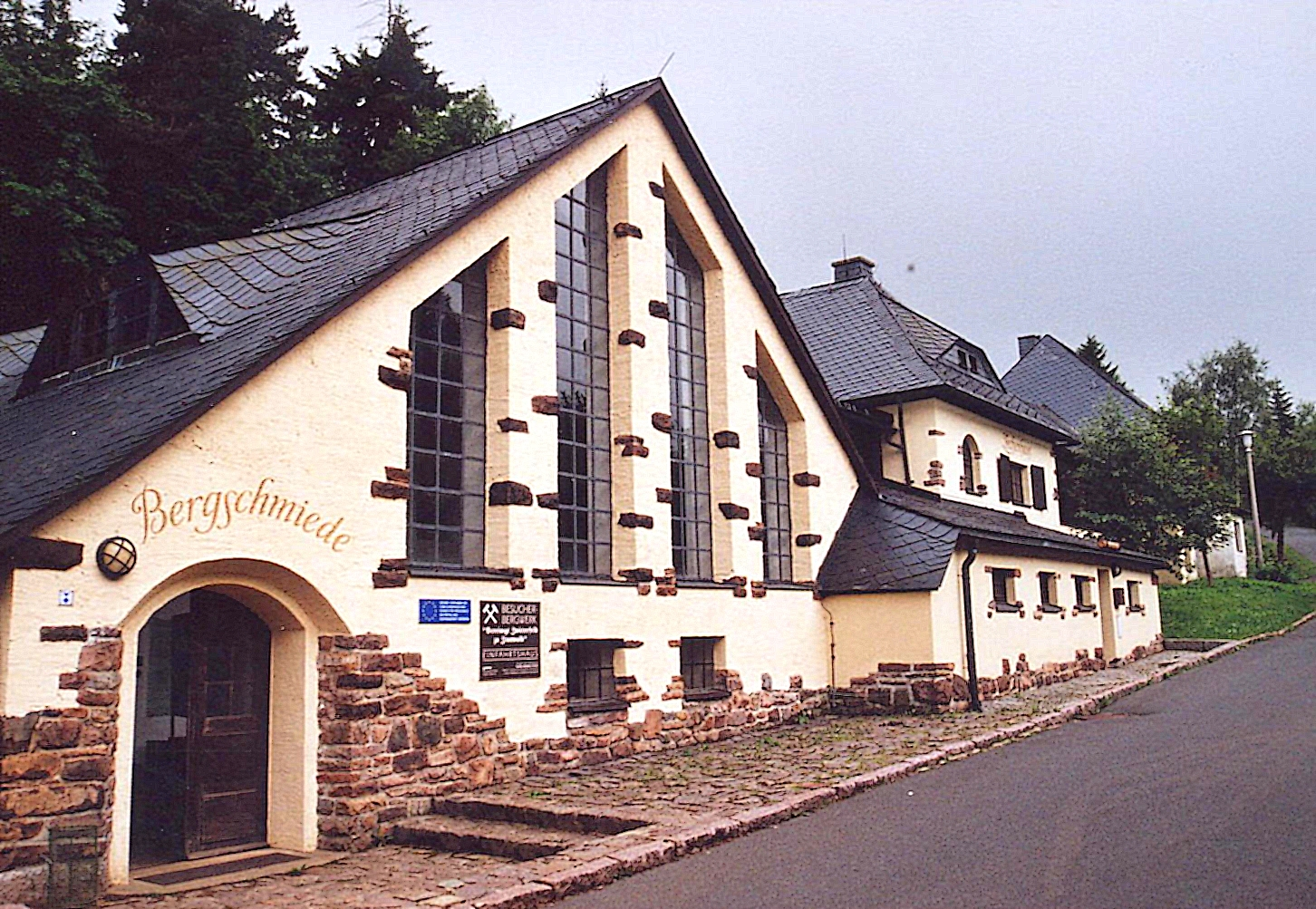
Vereinigt Zwitterfeld zu Zinnwald, tin mining museum in Altenberg

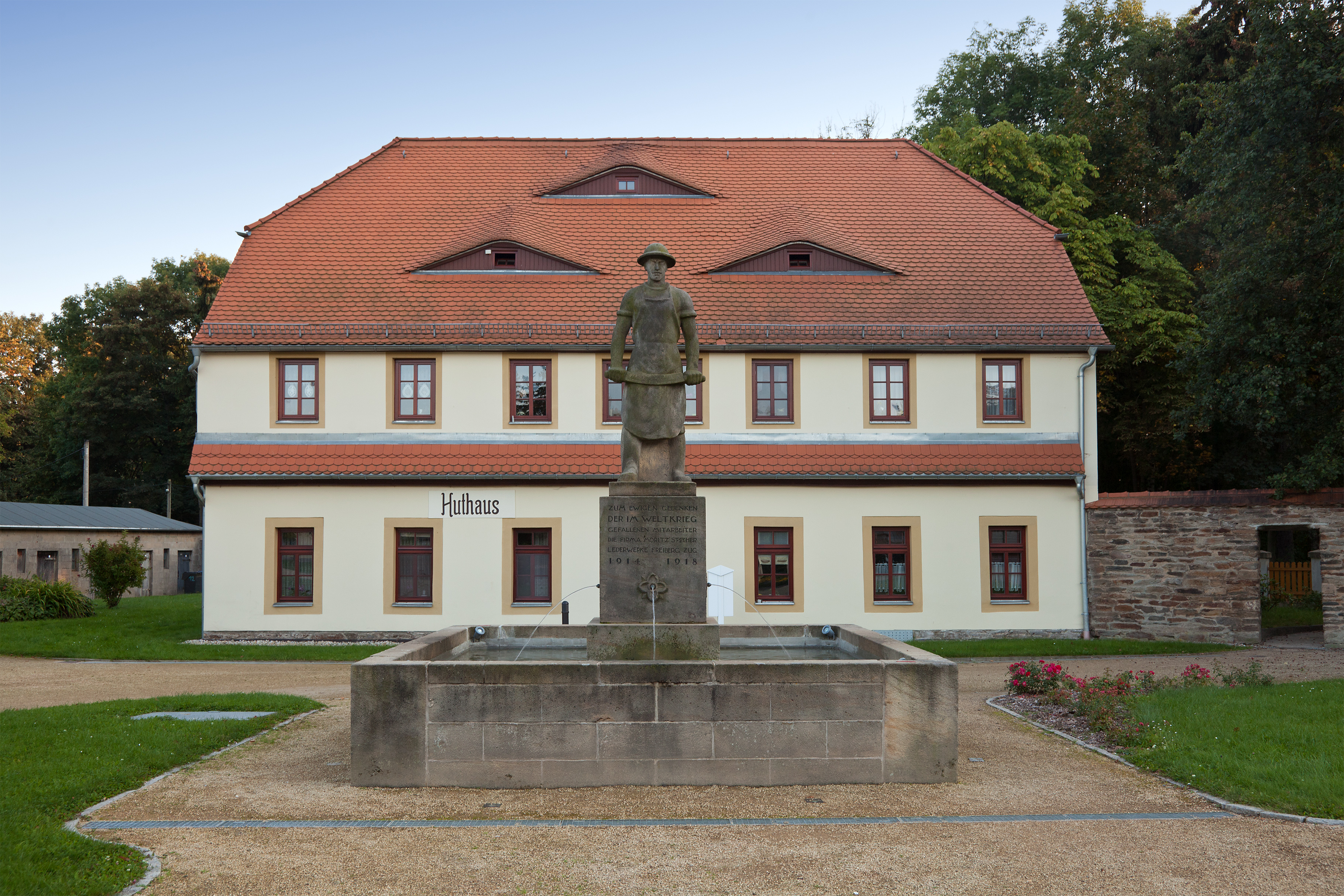
Smelting works of the Alte Mordgrube pit in Brand-Erbisdorf

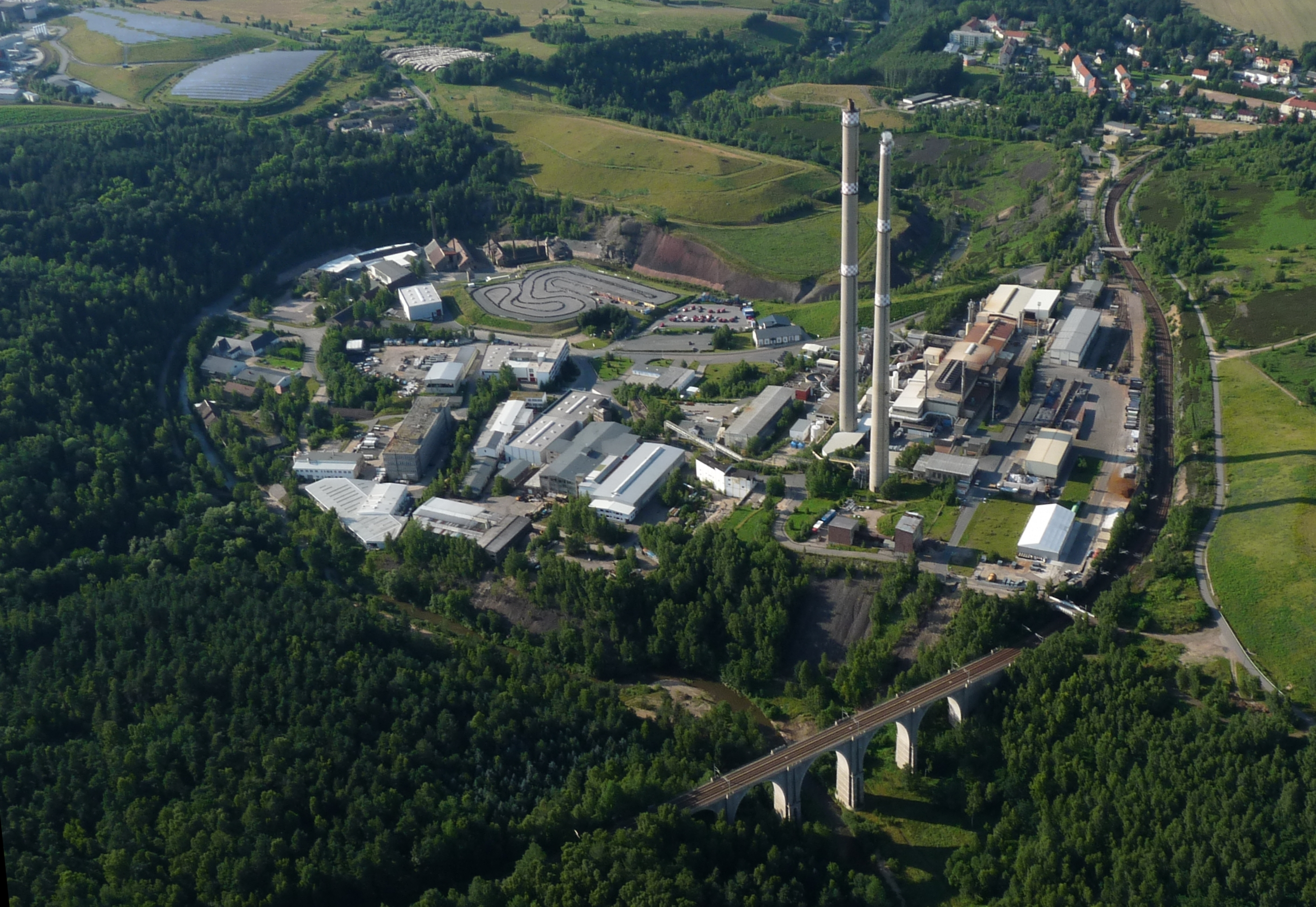
Muldenhütten smelting complex

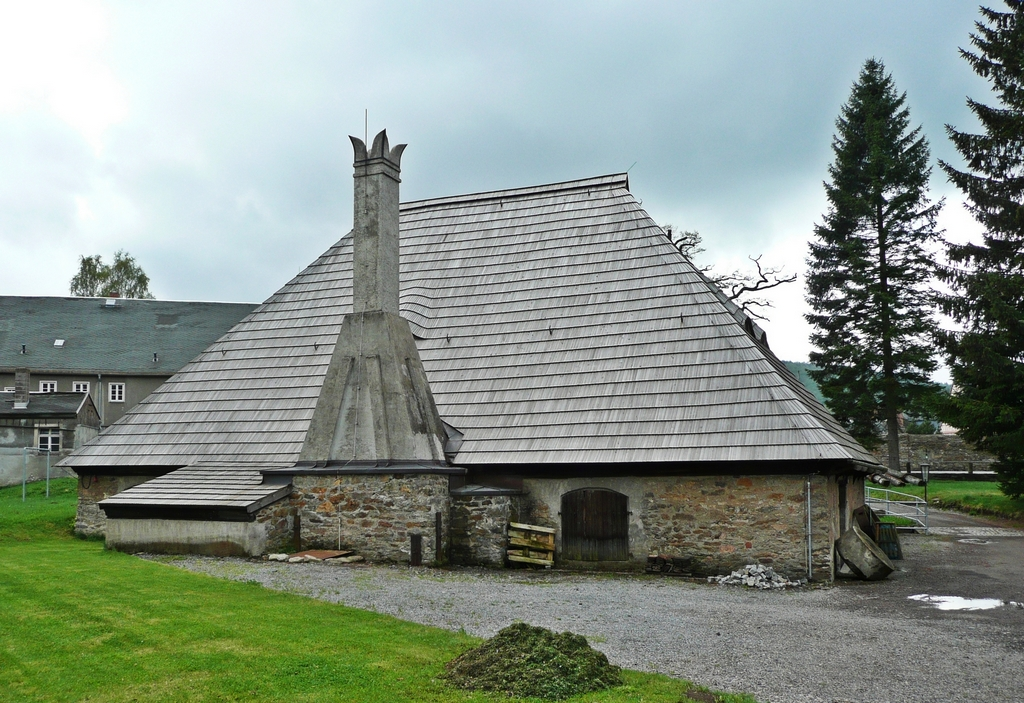
Old Copper Hammer Mill Althammer in the Saigerhütte Grünthal of Olbernhau

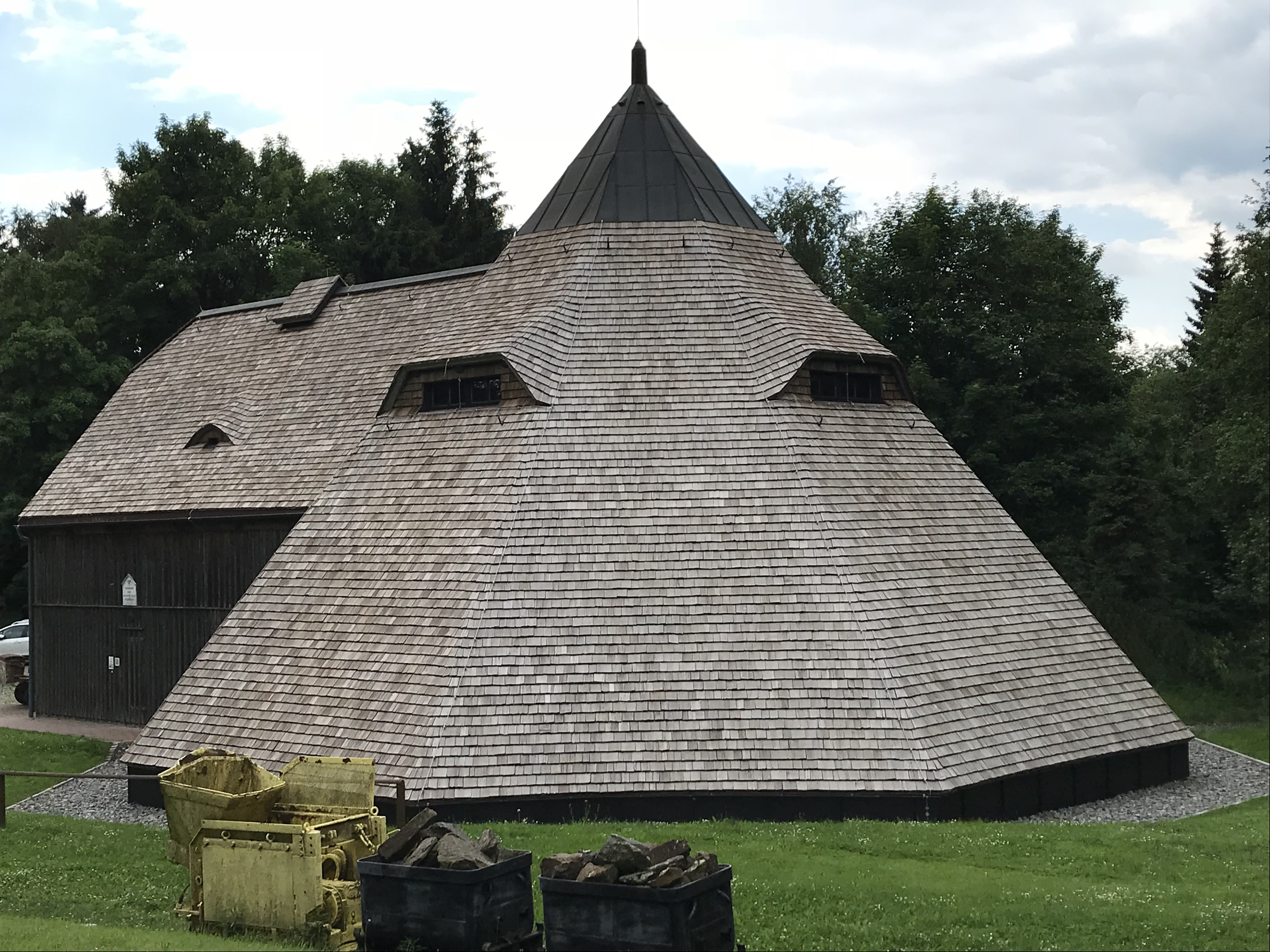
Horse Mill for ore mining in Johanngeorgenstadt

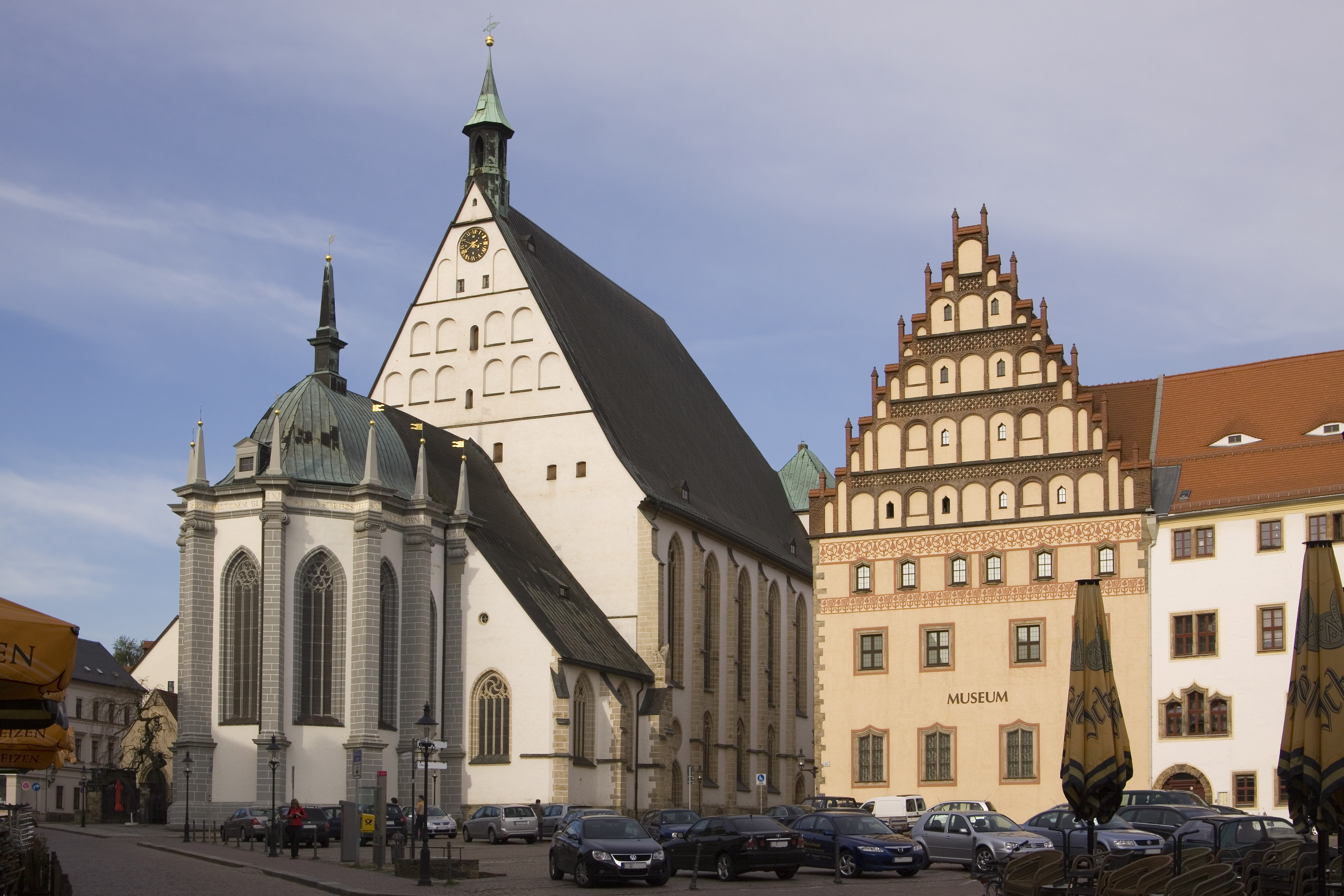
Freiberg Municipal and Mining Museum
