= Božídarský Špičák =

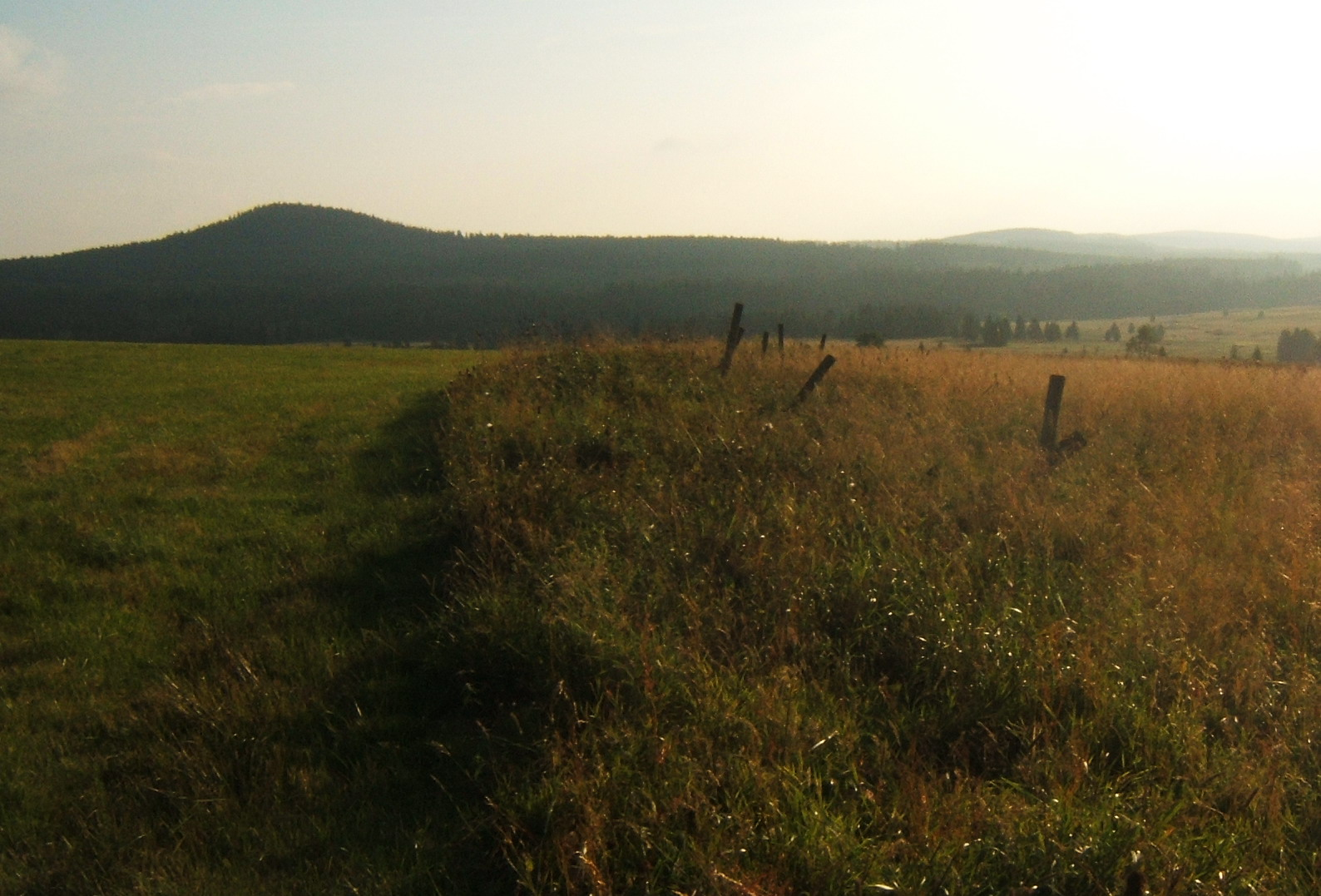
- The Božídarský Špičák at dusk

Highest point
- Elevation: 1,115 m (3,658 ft)
- Prominence: 108 m (354 ft)
- Isolation: 3.46 km (2.15 mi) to Klínovec
- Coordinates: 50°24′3″N 12°53′20″E

Geography
- Location within Czech Republic
- Parent range: Ore Mountains

Geology
- Mountain type: nephelin basalt

Climbing
- Access: ca. 1895 by an observation platform (Aussichtsgerüst)

The Božídarský Špičák (German: Gottesgaber Spitzberg) is the third highest mountain of the Ore Mountains. It lies in the Czech Republic near the highest town in Central Europe, Boží Dar.

== Location and surrounding area ==
The Božídarský Špičák lies two kilometres southwest of Boží Dar on the plateau of the Ore Mountains. The summit and the southern slopes belong to the municipal territory of Jáchymov, the northern slopes belong to Boží Dar. At the western foot of the summit there is an observation point near the ruins of the Spitzberghäuser, including those of the inn, Zur Wunderblume. To the northwest on the Černá creek is the Myslivny Reservoir.

== Geology ==
The Božídarský Špičák is the highest nephiline basalt summit (kuppe) in Central Europe.

== Nature ==
The summit and the surrounding area with the peat bogs is protected as the Božídarské rašeliniště National Nature Reserve. For nature conservation reasons its summit is not open to the public.

== History ==
Towards the end of the 19th century a wooden observation tower was erected on the summit, the key to which had to be borrowed from the Spitzberghäusern. However, after a few years the tower fell into ruins due to the effects of the weather and had to be demolished.

== Views ==
From the western foot of the Božídarský Špičák there is a panoramic view of the Ore Mountain ridge towards the west between Plešivec and Auersberg. To the south the view offers, where it is not blocked by trees, views of the valley of the river Ohře.

== See also ==
- List of mountains in the Ore Mountains
