= Krupka =

- Town
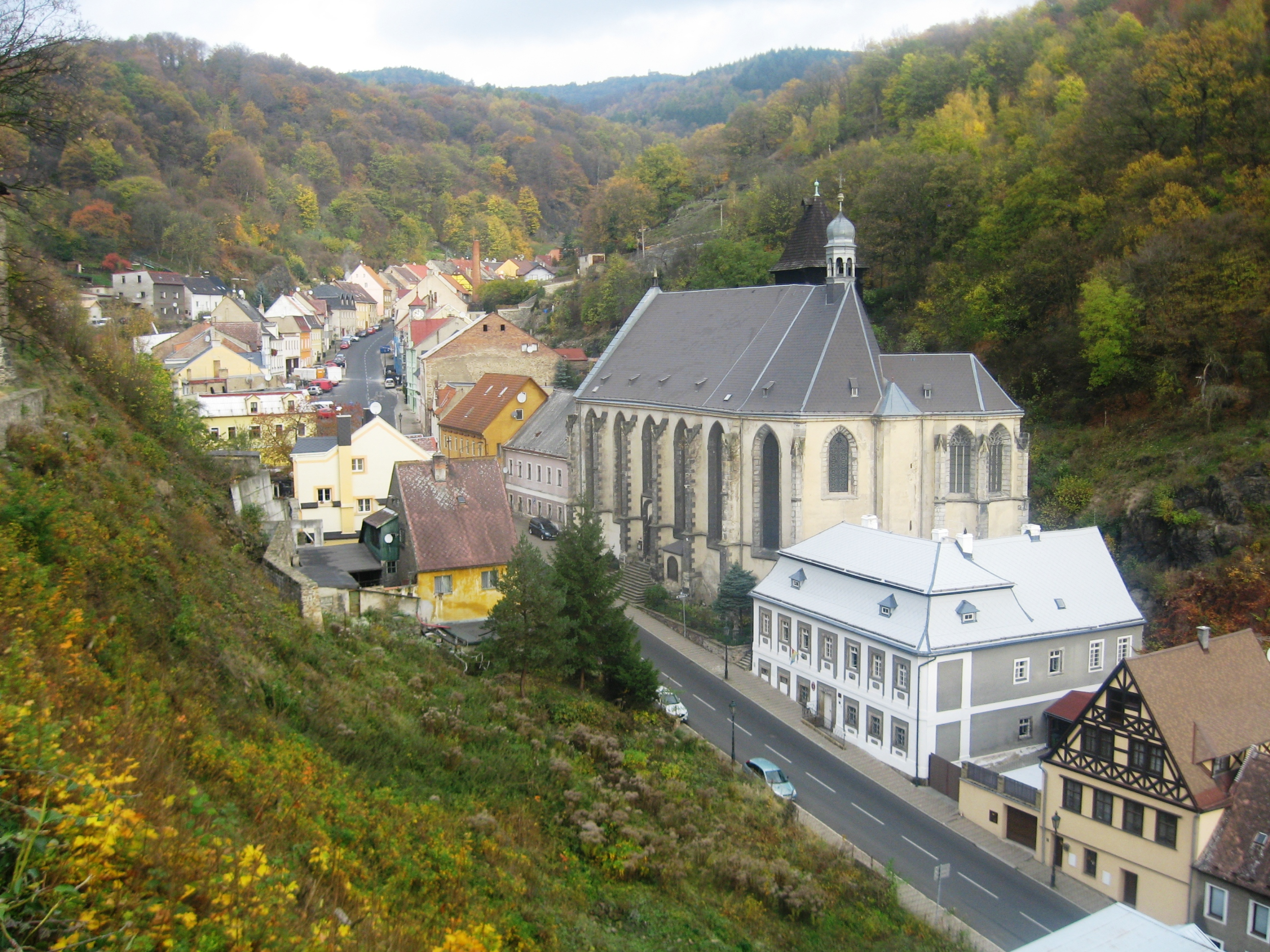
- Historic centre of Krupka

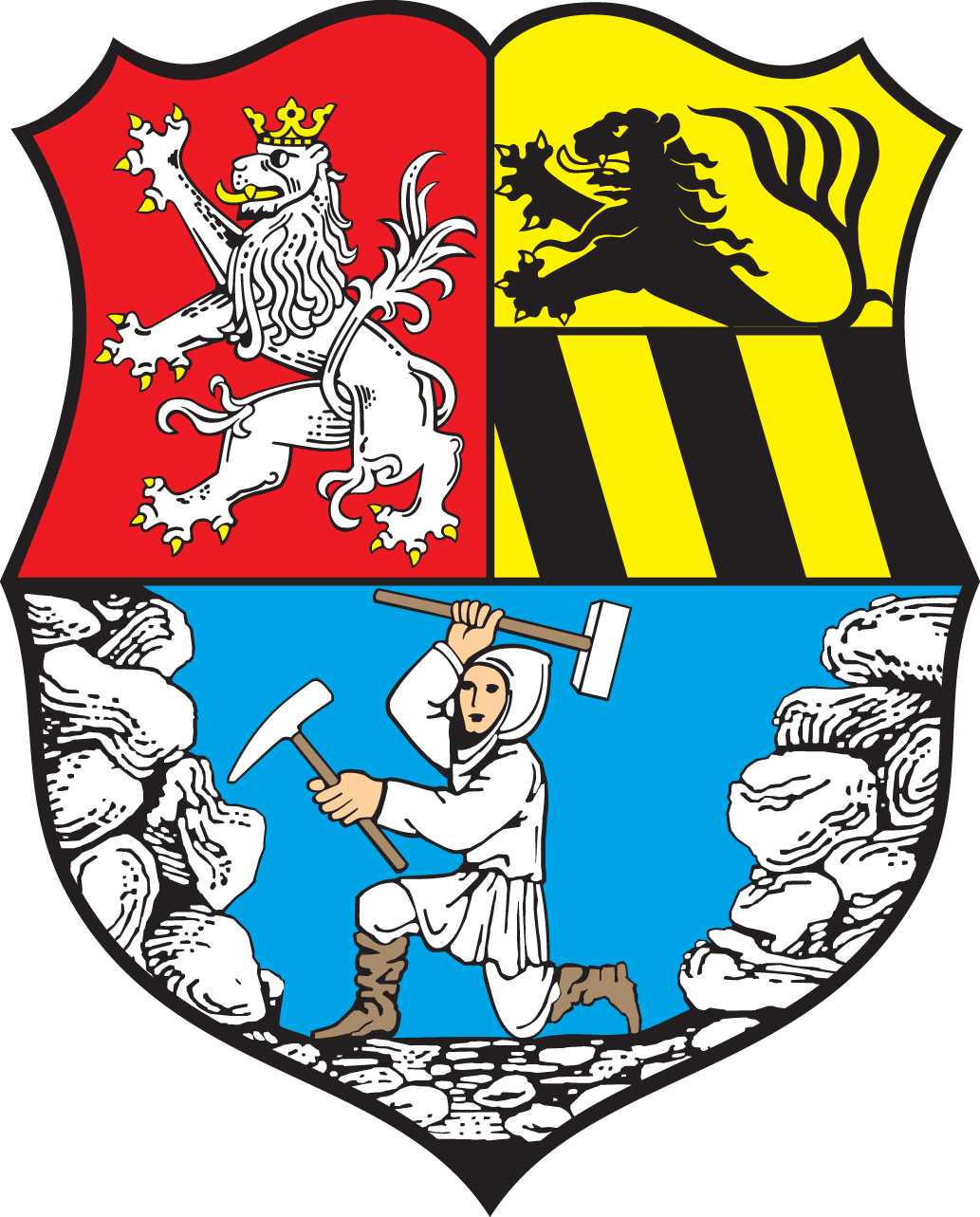
- Flag Coat of arms

- Location in the Czech Republic
- Coordinates: 50°41′4″N 13°51′30″E
- Country: Czech Republic
- Region: Ústí nad Labem
- District: Teplice
- First mentioned: 1305

Government
  - Mayor: Jan Kuzma (ANO)

Area
  - Total: 46.61 km^{2} (18.00 sq mi)
- Elevation: 300 m (980 ft)

Population (2026-01-01)
  - Total: 12,731
  - Density: 273.1/km^{2} (707.4/sq mi)
- Time zone: UTC+1 (CET)
  - Summer (DST): UTC+2 (CEST)
- Postal code: 417 42
- Website: www.krupka-mesto.cz

UNESCO World Heritage Site
- Part of: Erzgebirge/Krušnohoří Mining Region
- Criteria: Cultural: (ii)(iii)(iv)
- Reference: 1478-021
- Inscription: 2019 (43rd Session)

Krupka (Czech pronunciation: [ˈkrupka]; German: Graupen) is a town in Teplice District in the Ústí nad Labem Region of the Czech Republic. It has about 13,000 inhabitants. The town is located on the border between the Most Basin and Ore Mountains. The most populous part of Krupka is Bohosudov, which was a separate town until 1960.

The founding and development of Krupka is connected with the mining and processing of tin ore. The town is part of the Ore Mountain Mining Region, a UNESCO World Heritage Site. The centre of Krupka is well preserved and is protected as an urban monument zone. The most important monument in the town is the Basilica of Our Lady of Sorrows, protected as a national cultural monument.

== Administrative division ==
Krupka consists of nine municipal parts (in brackets population according to the 2021 census):

- Krupka (2,443)
- Bohosudov (3,806)
- Fojtovice (54)
- Horní Krupka (96)
- Maršov (3,622)
- Nové Modlany (205)
- Soběchleby (291)
- Unčín (796)
- Vrchoslav (793)

== Etymology ==
The name Krupka was derived from the old Czech adjective krupá, which meant 'rough'. Krupá was a name of a nearby hill. The German name Graupen was created by transcription of the Czech name.

== Geography ==
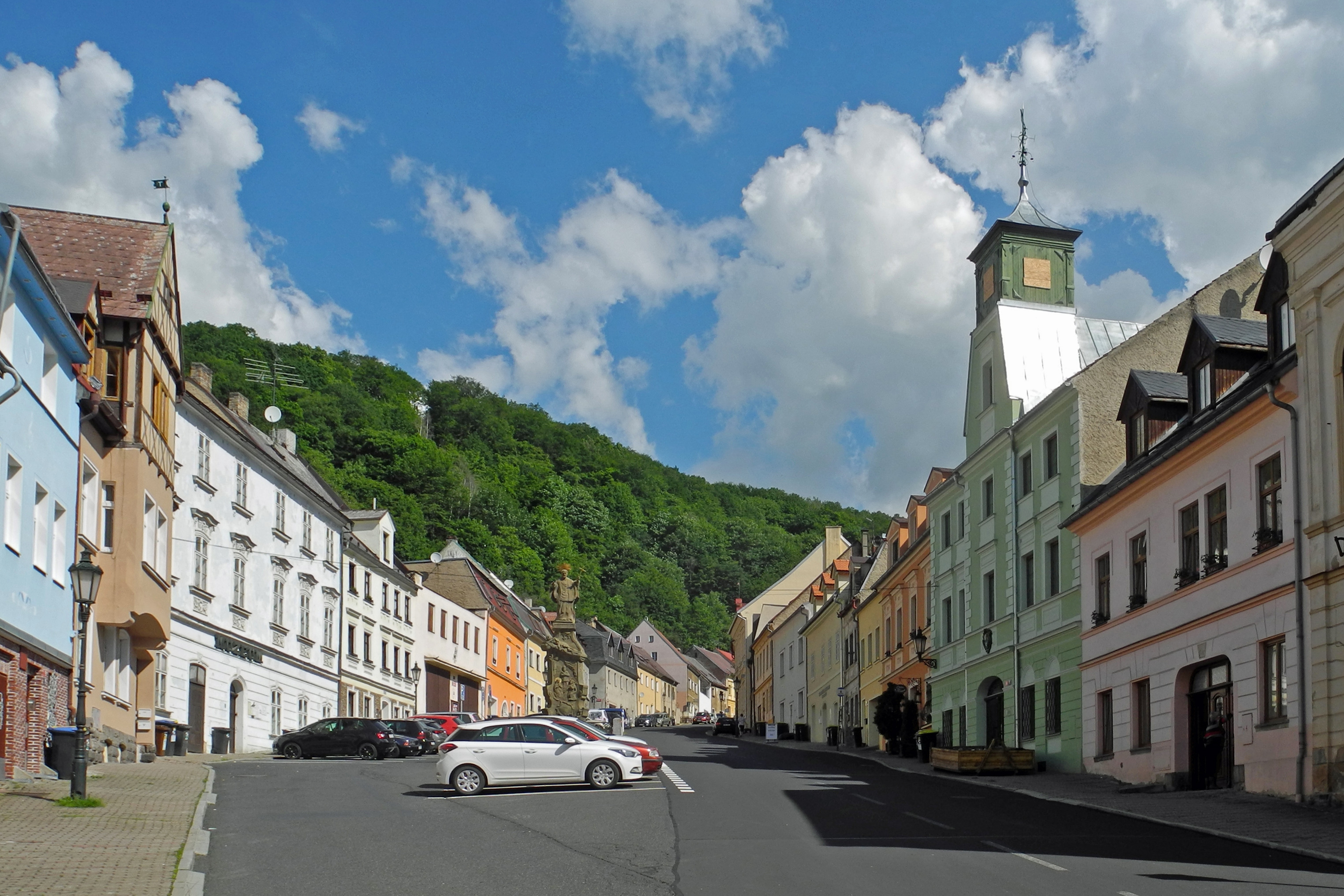
Centre of Krupka

Krupka is located about 3 kilometres (2 mi) north of Teplice and 11 km (7 mi) east of Ústí nad Labem. The southern part of the municipal territory with the built-up area lies the Most Basin, the northern part lies in the Ore Mountains.

On the southern border of Krupka is the Kateřina Reservoir, built at the beginning of the 20th century. It was built as part of water management protection and today it is also used for recreational purposes.

== History ==
The origin of the original mining town is connected with the mining of tin ore and its further processing. The first written mention of Krupka is in a deed of King Wenceslaus II from 1305. In 1330, existence of a guard fortress is mentioned. After the Hussite Wars, Krupka gained town privileges. During the late Middle Ages, the region was one of the world-leading producers of tin.

In the 17th century, problems with mining activities began to appear, and tin sales were stuck. The Thirty Years' War adversely affected mining. In 1708, the Clary-Aldringen family purchased the Krupka estate and owned it until 1918.

In the 19th century, the economic centre moved to neighbouring Bohosudov with the establishment of new factories and lignite mines. In 1858, the railway to Bohosudov was built. In 1898, Bohosudov was promoted to a town. From 1938 to 1945, Krupka and Bohosudov were annexed by Nazi Germany and administered as part of the Reichsgau Sudetenland. In 1960, Bohosudov was merged with Krupka and became its most populous municipal part.

== Demographics ==
Historical population

Year	Pop.	±%
1869	8,582	—
1880	10,778	+25.6%
1890	11,826	+9.7%
1900	13,952	+18.0%
1910	14,635	+4.9%

Year	Pop.	±%
1921	14,507	−0.9%
1930	16,096	+11.0%
1950	8,275	−48.6%
1961	9,059	+9.5%
1970	8,729	−3.6%

Year	Pop.	±%
1980	9,336	+7.0%
1991	12,620	+35.2%
2001	13,318	+5.5%
2011	13,147	−1.3%
2021	12,106	−7.9%

Source: Censuses

== Transport ==
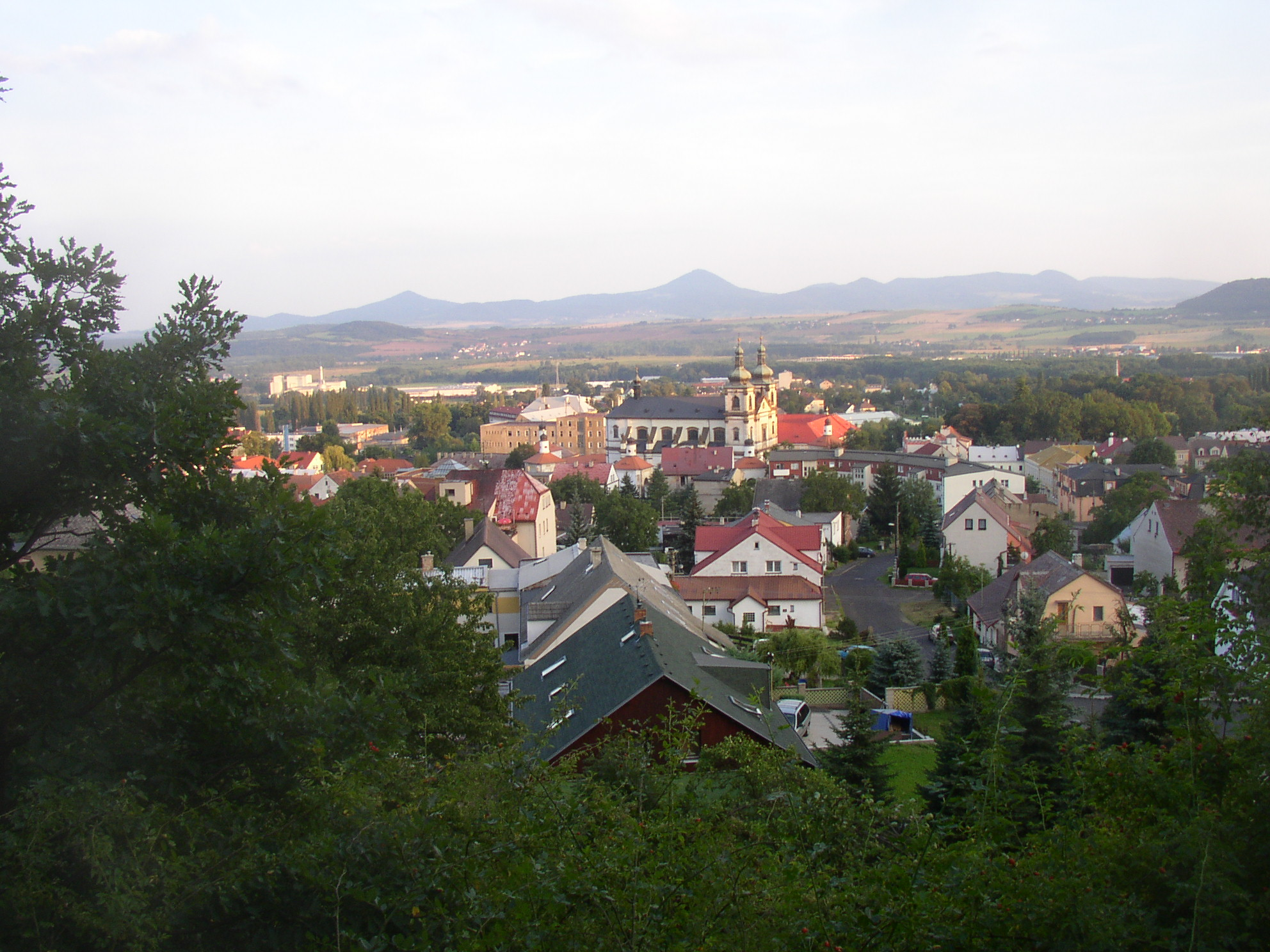
View of Bohosudov

Two railway lines passes through Krupka: Děčín–Kadaň and Ústí nad Labem–Litvínov. The train station is named Krupka-Bohosudov.

== Sport ==
The town is home to the association football team FK Krupka, which plas in lower amateur tiers. The table tennis club has a long tradition in Krupka. Other organized sports in Krupka are athletics, swimming, floorball and bicross. The athletics stadium known as the TJ Baník stadium previously hosted motorcycle speedway from 1958 to 1966 and hosted a final round of the Czechoslovak Individual Speedway Championship for four consecutive years from 1959 to 1962.

== Sights ==
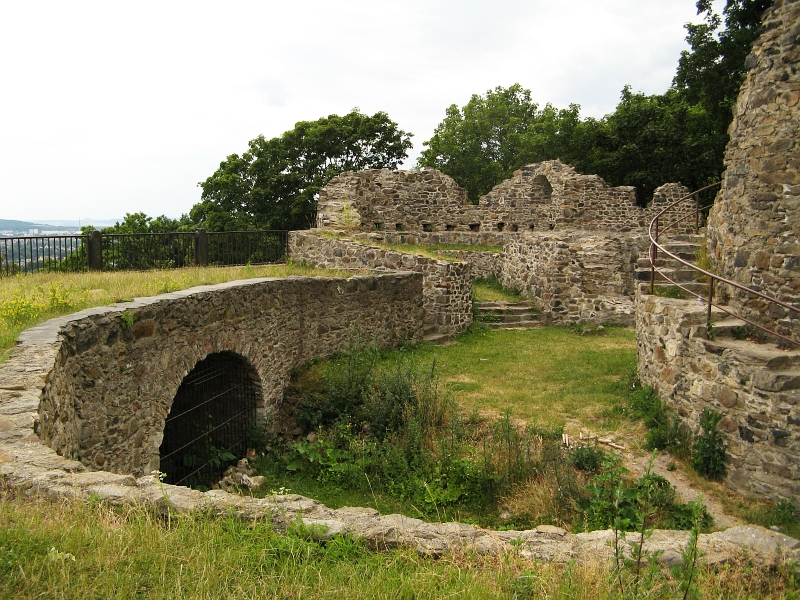
Ruins of Krupka Castle

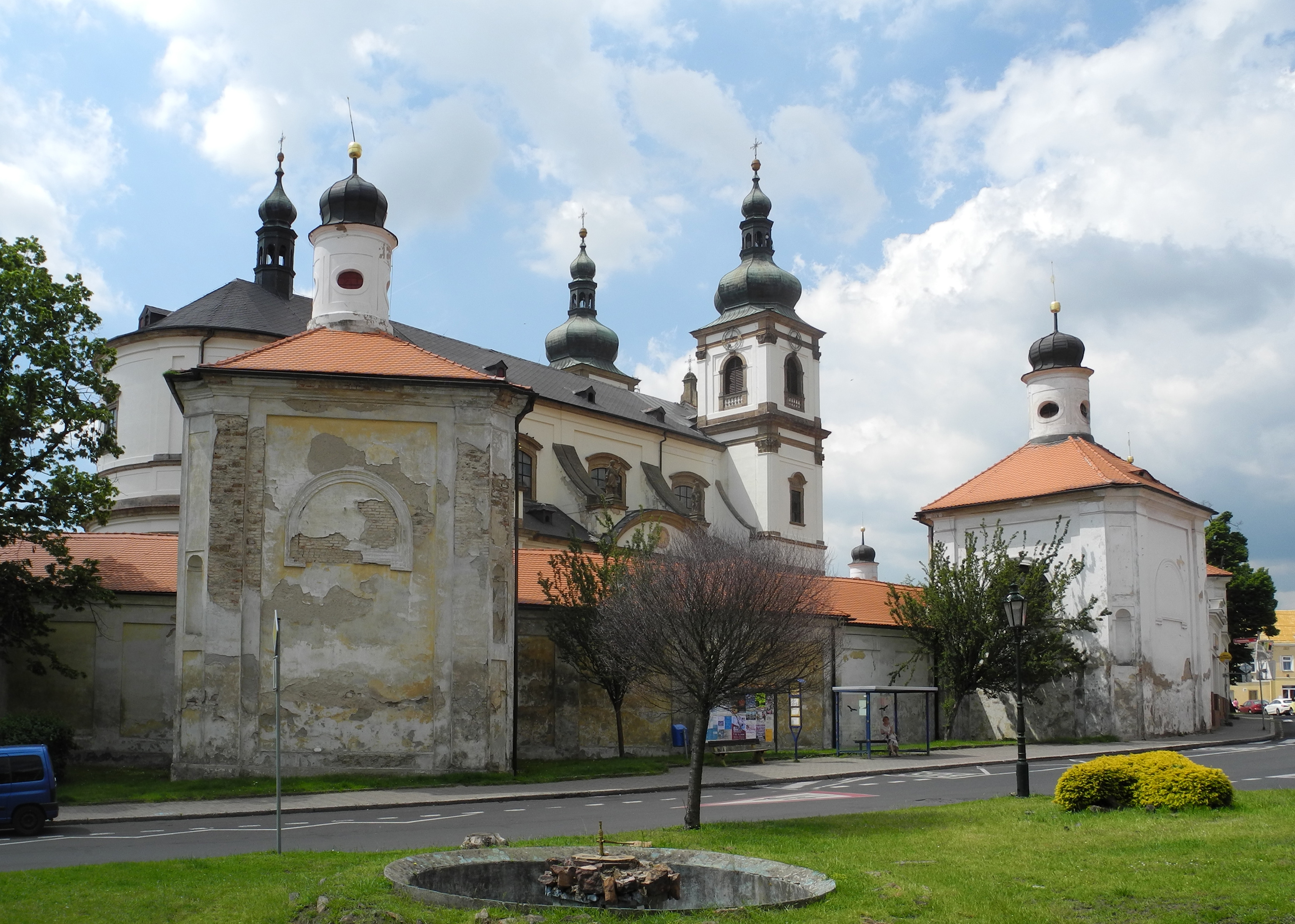
Basilica of Our Lady of Sorrows

The historic centre of Krupka is made up of Husitská Street, formerly the seat of various craftsmen. Today's appearance of the street consists of rebuilt or reconstructed originally Renaissance houses. The main landmark is the Church of the Assumption of the Virgin Mary from the 14th century. It was destroyed by fires many times and restored in 1668. Behind the church there is a bell tower from the 15th century. Above the church, there is the former town hall, today privately owned.

The Church of the Holy Spirit was built in 1440–1454, originally in the Gothic style. The third church in the street is the Church of Saint Wenceslaus from 1901. Above the street, there is the ruin of Krupka Castle. Only the massive walls have been preserved. It serves as a view point.

The big statue of Saint Francis Xavier belongs to the symbols of the town. It is a Baroque statue from 1717. It was built to commemorate the retreat of the plague.

The mining cultural landscape of Krupka was designated a UNESCO World Heritage Site in 2019 as part of the transnational Ore Mountain Mining Region. In connection with the mining, there was created an educational pathway leading from the Czech side to the German side and showing various historically important sites. In Husitská Street, there is the Infocentre of Krupka Mining Region with an exposition focused on history and life in Krupka, mining in the Ore Mountains, and an ore collection.

The Basilica of Our Lady of Sorrows is the most significant building in Bohosudov. It was built in the Baroque style by Octavio Broggio in 1701–1709 and has a pilgrimage tradition. It is protected as a national cultural monument.

== Notable people ==
- Carl Ferdinand von Arlt (1812–1887), Austrian ophthalmologist
- Herta Lindner (1920–1943), German resistance fighter
- Radim Breite (born 1989), footballer

== Twin towns – sister cities ==
Krupka is twinned with:

- Geising (Altenberg), Germany
