= Karlovy Vary–Johanngeorgenstadt railway =

Railway line in Germany

Karlovy Vary dolní nádraží–Johanngeorgenstadt
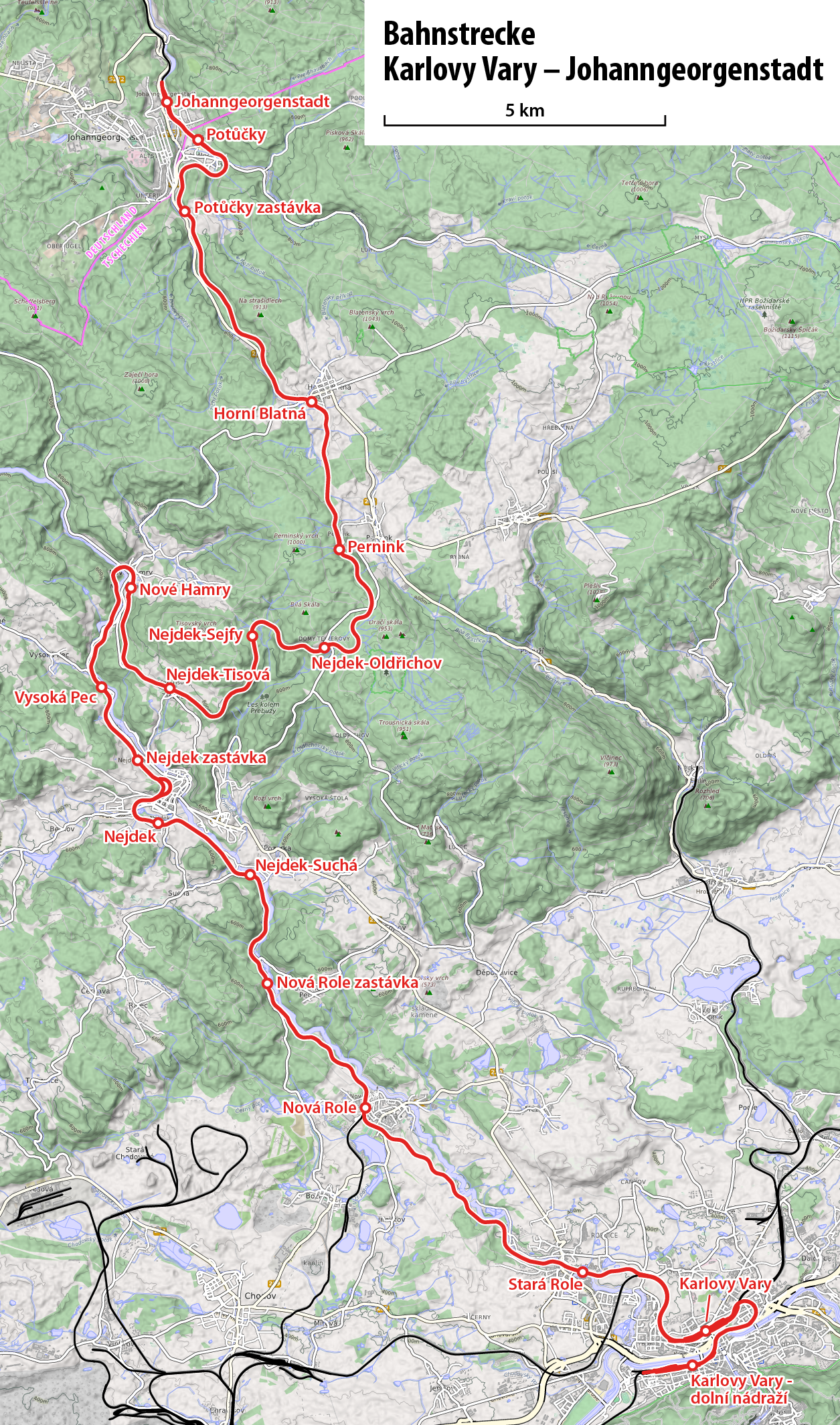

Service
- Route number: 142

Technical
- Line length: 47.0 km (29.2 mi) (Line class: Karlovy Vary–Nejdek: B2; Nejdek–Staatsgrenze: A1)
- Track gauge: 1,435 mm (4 ft 8 1/2 in)
- Operating speed: 50 km/h (31 mph) max.

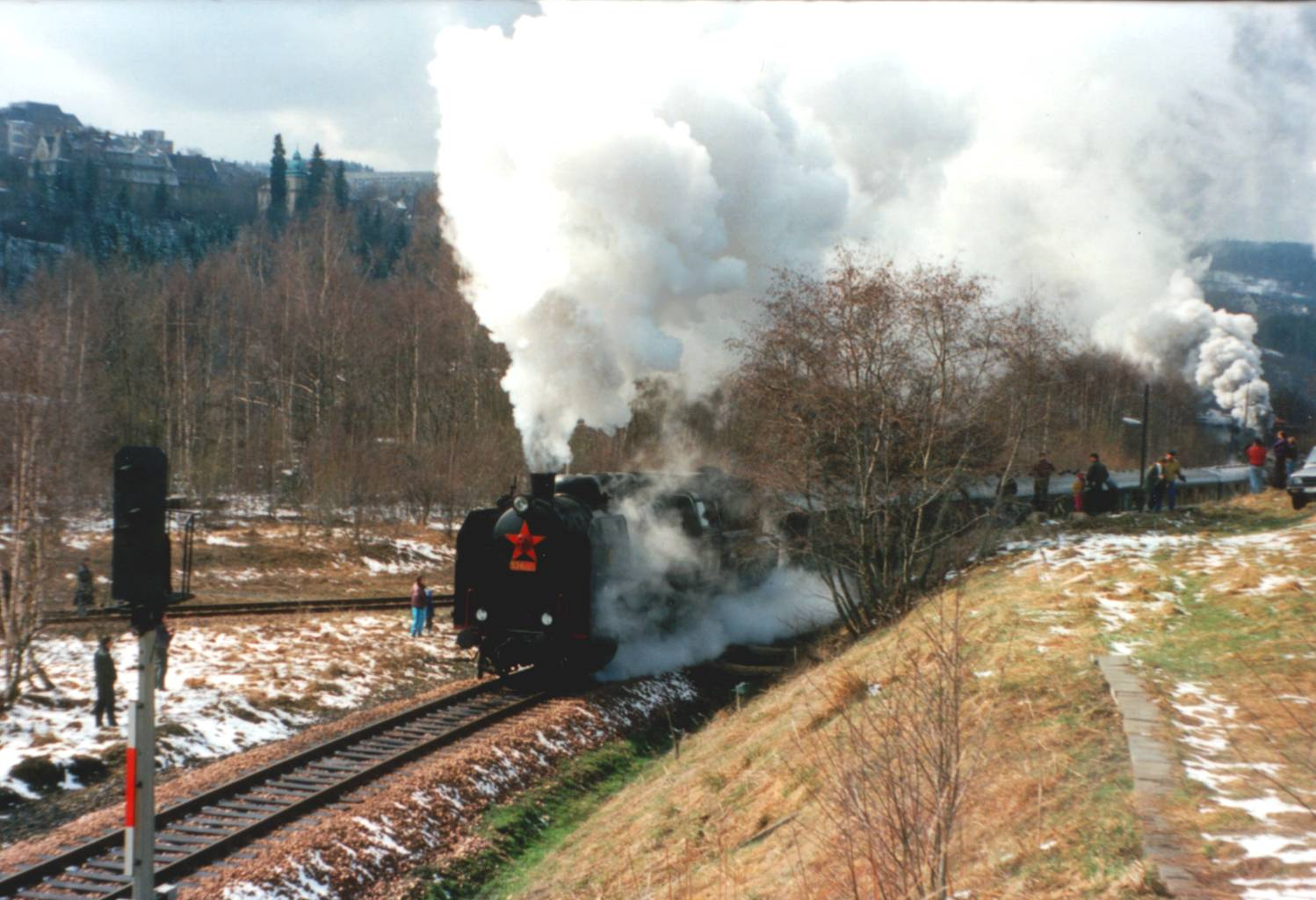
Re-opening of the railway border crossing at Potůčky-Johanngeorgenstadt in 1992

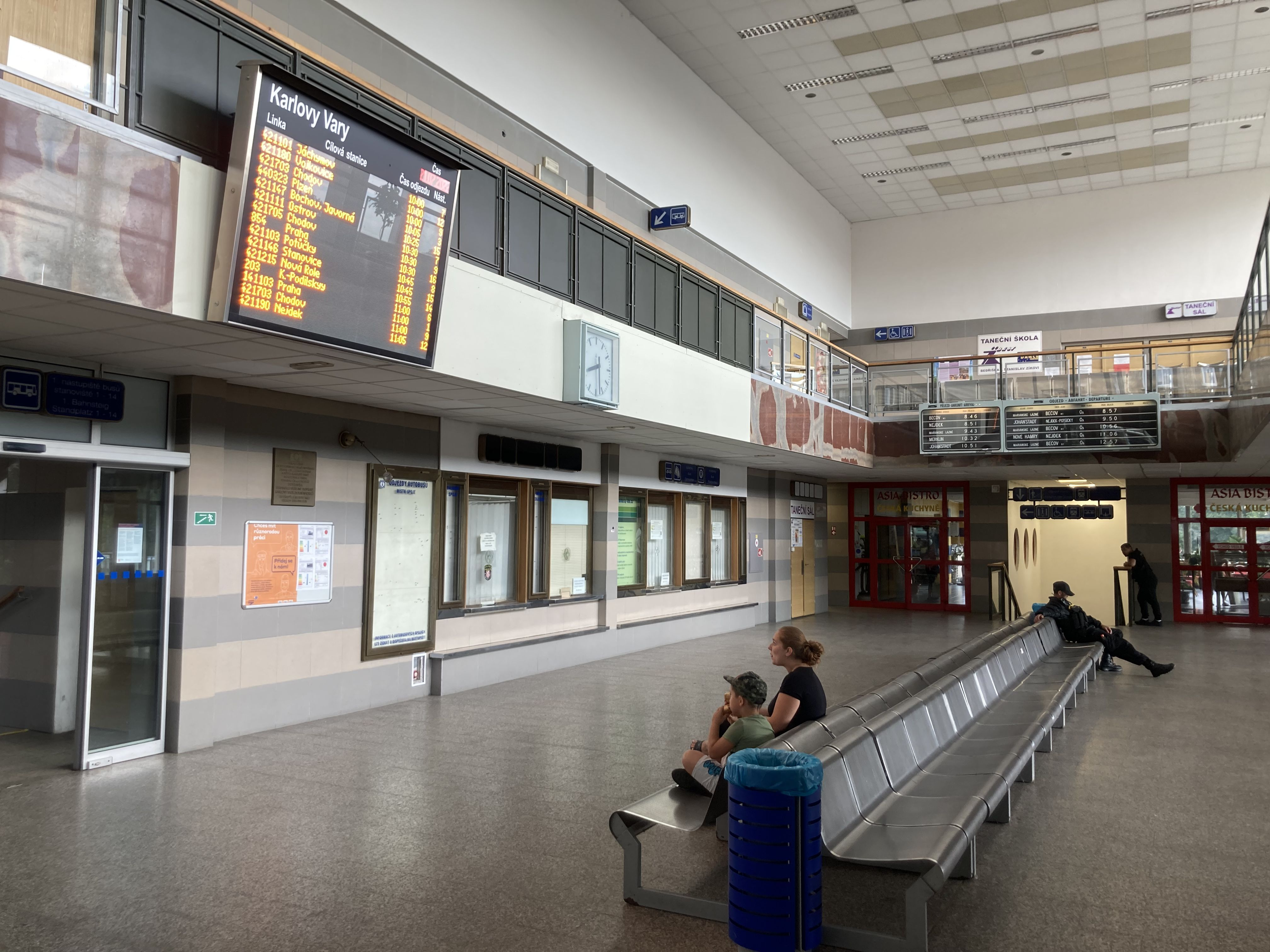
Interior of Karlovy Vary dolní nádraží

The Karlovy Vary–Johanngeorgenstadt railway connects Karlovy Vary in the Czech Republic with Johanngeorgenstadt in Saxony, Germany. The highest point of this mountain railway lies 915 metres (3,002 ft) above sea level. The entire line was opened for regular traffic in 1899.

The railway station at Pernink is the highest in the Ore Mountains and was for a short time also the highest railway station in the Bohemian Kingdom.

Shortly after the end of the Second World War, cross-border traffic was terminated. The track between the Czechoslovak Socialist Republic and East Germany was maintained for military reasons only. After the fall of communism in Central Europe in 1989, the newly elected democratic governments of both countries began discussions on the restoration of cross-border traffic; this was finally achieved in 1992.

The line is operated by railcars of ČD Class 814 Regionova. During periods of heavy snowfall, they are replaced by diesel locomotives of ČD class 714 with two to three BDtax passenger cars. Services of the DB's subsidiary, Erzgebirgsbahn, are worked by Siemens Desiro Classics.
