= Měděnec =

- Municipality
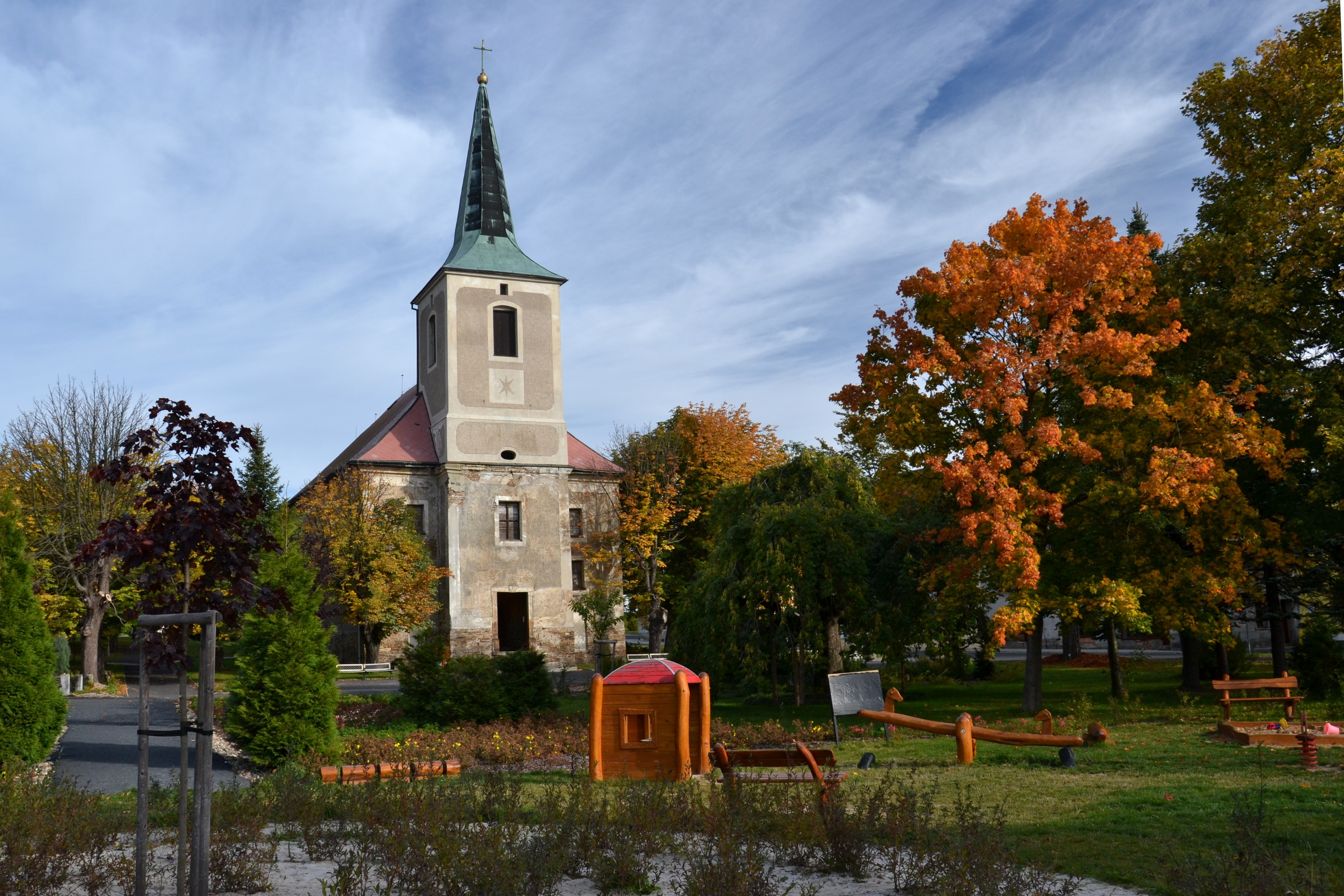
- Church of the Nativity of the Virgin Mary

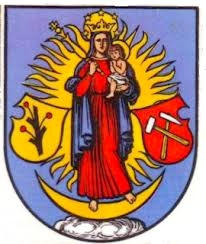
- Coat of arms

- Location in the Czech Republic
- Coordinates: 50°25′18″N 13°6′56″E
- Country: Czech Republic
- Region: Ústí nad Labem
- District: Chomutov
- Founded: 1520

Area
  - Total: 12.79 km^{2} (4.94 sq mi)
- Elevation: 845 m (2,772 ft)

Population (2026-01-01)
  - Total: 147
  - Density: 11.5/km^{2} (29.8/sq mi)
- Time zone: UTC+1 (CET)
  - Summer (DST): UTC+2 (CEST)
- Postal code: 431 84
- Website: www.medenec.cz

Měděnec (German: Kupferberg) is a municipality and village in Chomutov District in the Ústí nad Labem Region of the Czech Republic. It has about 100 inhabitants.

Měděnec lies approximately 21 kilometres (13 mi) west of Chomutov, 71 km (44 mi) west of Ústí nad Labem, and 101 km (63 mi) west of Prague.

== Administrative division ==
Měděnec consists of five municipal parts (in brackets population according to the 2021 census):

- Měděnec (109)
- Horní Halže (12)
- Kamenné (3)
- Kotlina (6)
- Mýtinka (11)

== Demographics ==
Historical population
Year	Pop.	±%
1869	2,524	—
1880	2,866	+13.5%
1890	2,916	+1.7%
1900	3,087	+5.9%
1910	2,982	−3.4%
1921	2,603	−12.7%
1930	2,849	+9.5%
1950	831	−70.8%
1961	270	−67.5%
1970	236	−12.6%
1980	282	+19.5%
1991	170	−39.7%
2001	155	−8.8%
2011	137	−11.6%
2021	141	+2.9%
Source: Censuses
