= Boží Dar =

- Town
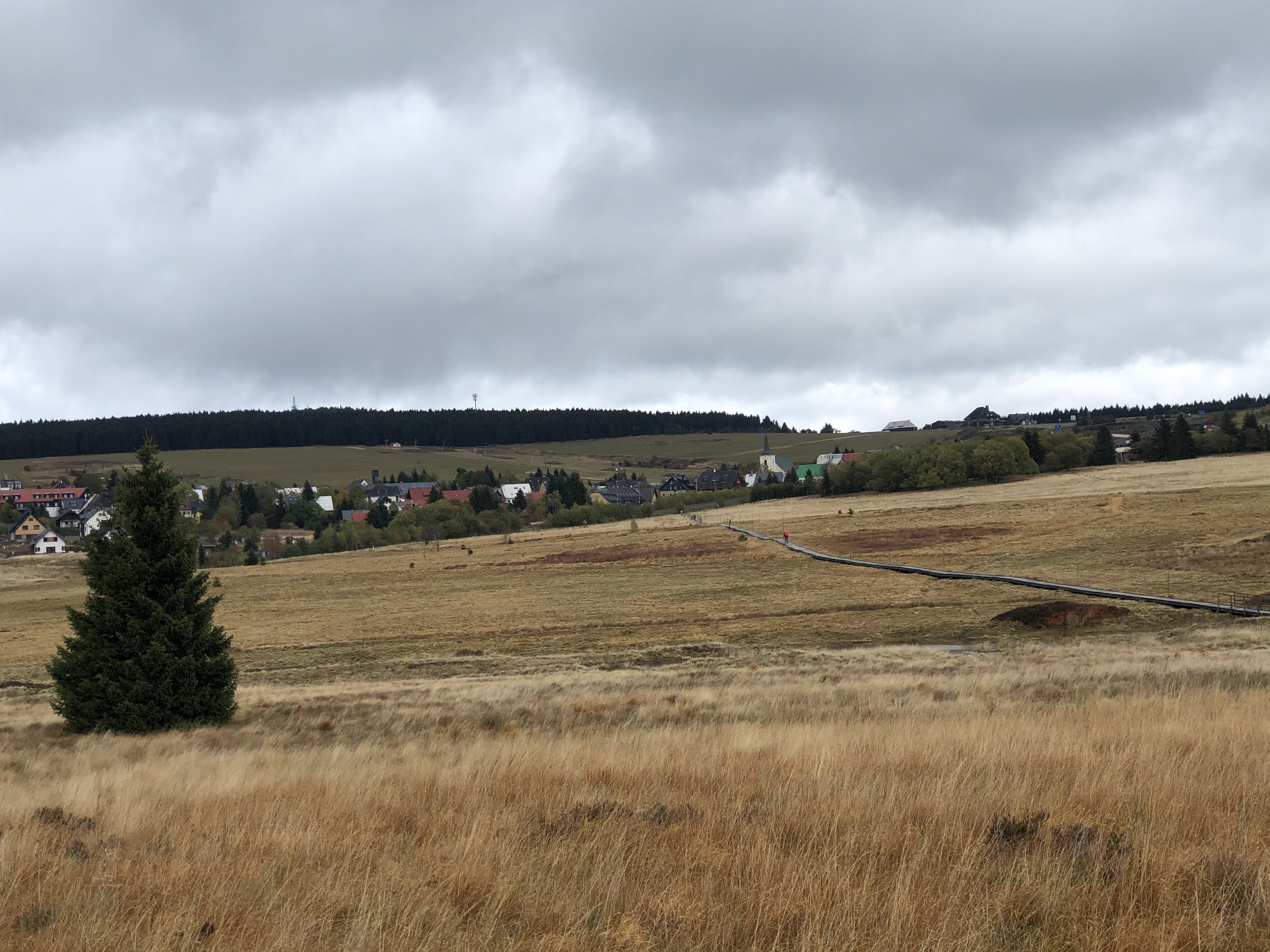
- View from the west

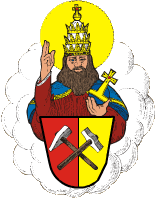
- Coat of arms

- Location in the Czech Republic
- Coordinates: 50°24′35″N 12°55′28″E
- Country: Czech Republic
- Region: Karlovy Vary
- District: Karlovy Vary
- Founded: 1533

Government
  - Mayor: Jakub Čáslavský

Area
  - Total: 37.91 km^{2} (14.64 sq mi)
- Elevation: 1,028 m (3,373 ft)

Population (2026-01-01)
  - Total: 250
  - Density: 6.6/km^{2} (17/sq mi)
- Time zone: UTC+1 (CET)
  - Summer (DST): UTC+2 (CEST)
- Postal code: 362 62
- Website: www.bozi-dar.cz

UNESCO World Heritage Site
- Part of: Erzgebirge/Krušnohoří Mining Region
- Criteria: Cultural: (ii)(iii)(iv)
- Reference: 1478-019
- Inscription: 2019 (43rd Session)

Boží Dar (Czech pronunciation: [ˈboʒiː ˈdar]; German: Gottesgab) is a town in Karlovy Vary District in the Karlovy Vary Region of the Czech Republic. It has about 300 inhabitants. Situated in the Ore Mountains at 1,028 m (3,373 ft) above sea level, it is considered the highest town in the Czech Republic.

Boží Dar is known as a ski resort. The town is part of the Abertamy – Boží Dar Mining Landscape, which is a UNESCO World Heritage Site as part of Ore Mountain Mining Region.

== Administrative division ==
Boží Dar consists of three municipal parts (in brackets population according to the 2021 census):

- Boží Dar (199)
- Ryžovna (1)
- Zlatý Kopec (1)

== Etymology ==
Both the original German name Gottesgab and the Czech name Boží Dar literally mean 'gift of God'. The name is said to have come from the statement of the founder of the village, John Frederick I, in which he described the local silver in this way.

== Geography ==
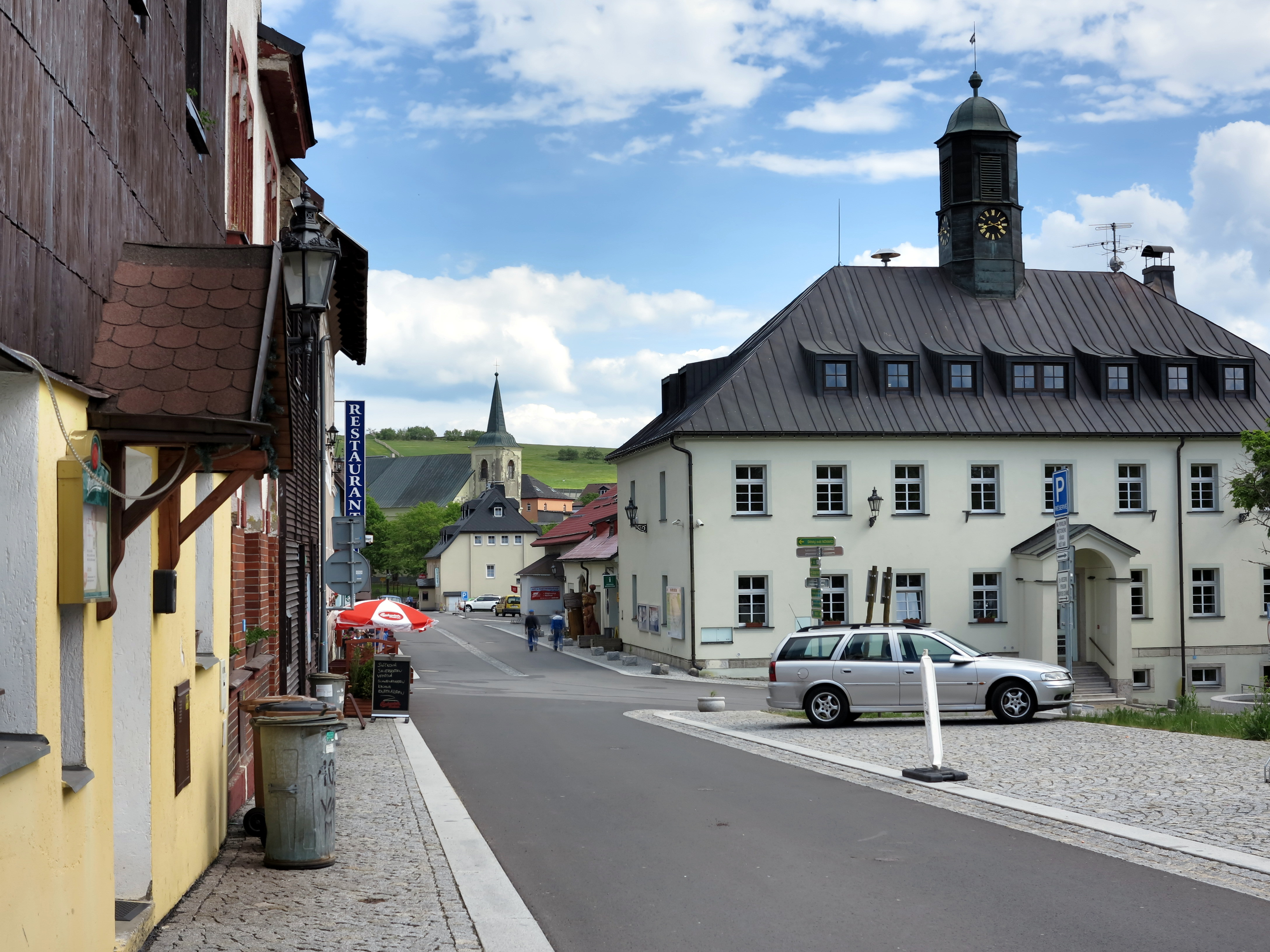
Main street and town hall

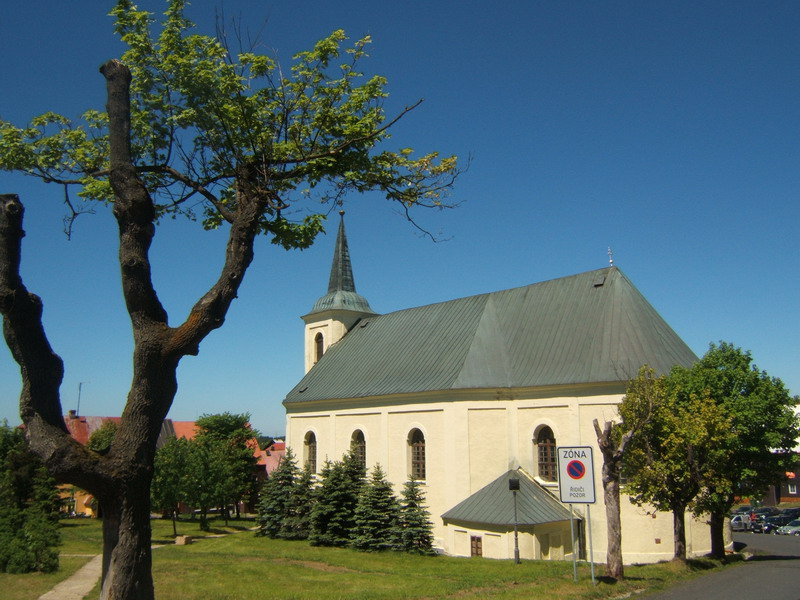
Church of Saint Anne

Boží Dar is located about 20 kilometres (12 mi) north of Karlovy Vary, on the border with Germany. It lies in the Ore Mountains. The highest point is the mountain Božídarský Špičák at 1,116 m (3,661 ft) above sea level. The area around Božídarský Špičák with peat bogs is protected as the Božídarské rašeliniště National Nature Reserve.

The Schwarzwasser Stream (here called Černá) flows across the municipal territory. The Myslivny Reservoir is supplied by the stream.

== History ==
The remote area in the Saxon Barony of Schwarzenberg was settled after silver and tin mining began about 1517. Boží Dar was founded as a mining town by decree of John Frederick I, Elector of Saxony, who acquired the lordship in 1533. Together with neighbouring Horní Blatná, John Frederick had to cede the town to the Habsburg lands of the Bohemian Crown in 1547 after the Schmalkaldic War and his defeat in the Battle of Mühlberg.

The peak of mining dates back to the 1550s and 1560s, when the town had over 2,000 inhabitants. In 1580, Emperor Rudolf II promoted Boží Dar to the royal mining town. During the Thirty Years' War, the town was looted several times. In 1643, it was plundered by the Swedish army. After the decline of mining in the 17th and 18th centuries, the original important mining town gradually turned into a mountain town, whose inhabitants subsisted on various domestic productions.

After World War I, Boží Dar became part of Czechoslovakia. It was mainly settled by Sudeten Germans. In 1938, the municipality was annexed by Nazi Germany and administered as part of the Reichsgau Sudetenland. After World War II, the German-speaking population was expelled. The historic town privileges were lost in the 1950s, but restored in 2006.

== Demographics ==
Historical population

Year	Pop.	±%
1869	2,194	—
1880	2,290	+4.4%
1890	2,269	−0.9%
1900	2,224	−2.0%
1910	2,392	+7.6%

Year	Pop.	±%
1921	1,913	−20.0%
1930	1,914	+0.1%
1950	910	−52.5%
1961	341	−62.5%
1970	152	−55.4%

Year	Pop.	±%
1980	128	−15.8%
1991	111	−13.3%
2001	170	+53.2%
2011	193	+13.5%
2021	201	+4.1%

Source: Censuses

== Transport ==
The I/25 road connects Boží Dar with Ostrov. Boží Dar is the site of a road border crossing to Oberwiesenthal in Germany.

== Sport ==
Boží Dar lies in one of the most important winter sport regions in the Czech Republic.The town is known for two ski resorts with several downhill runs and four ski lifts.

== Sights ==
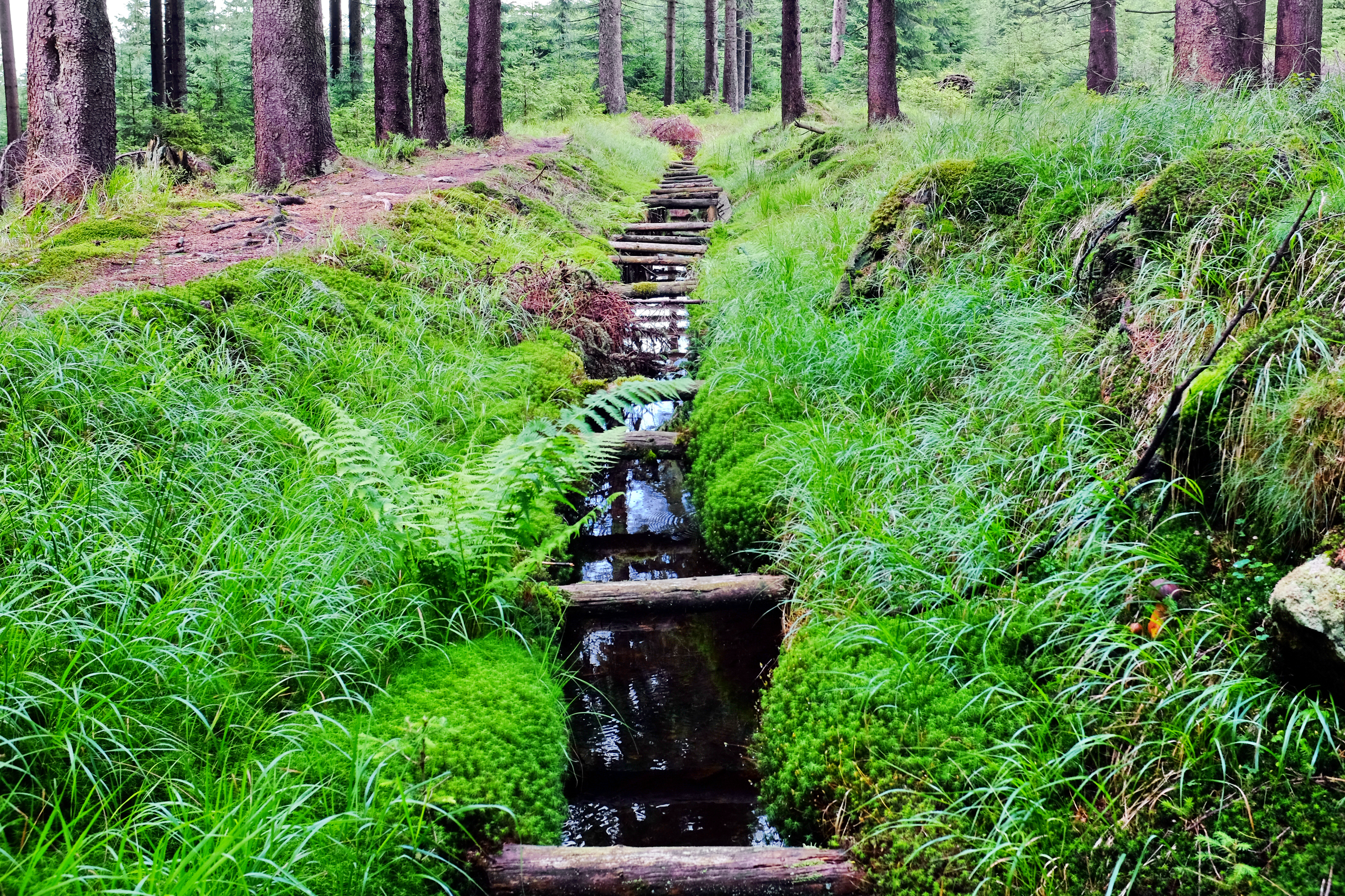
Blatenský water ditch

The town belongs to the so-called Abertamy – Boží Dar – Horní Blatná Mining Landscape, which is a UNESCO World Heritage Site as part of Ore Mountain Mining Region. The most valuable remnant of former mining in the area is the Blatenský water ditch. It is a technical monument, protected as a national cultural monument. It was built in 1540–1544 and was used for mining tin ore and for transporting wood. It is 11.6 km (7.2 mi) long and runs across the municipal territory. An educational trail runs along the ditch.

The main landmark of the town is the Church of Saint Anne. It was built in the Baroque style in 1771, when it replaced an older Renaissance church.

The late Empire town hall was built in 1844–1845 and together with the church belongs to the main landmarks of the town square.

== Notable people ==
- Kaspar Eberhard (1523–1575), Lutheran theologian; local pastor in 1554
- Nikos Kazantzakis (1883–1957), Greek writer; spent several months in Myslivny in 1929–1932
- Lukáš Bauer (born 1977), cross country skier; lives here
