= Horní Blatná =

- Town
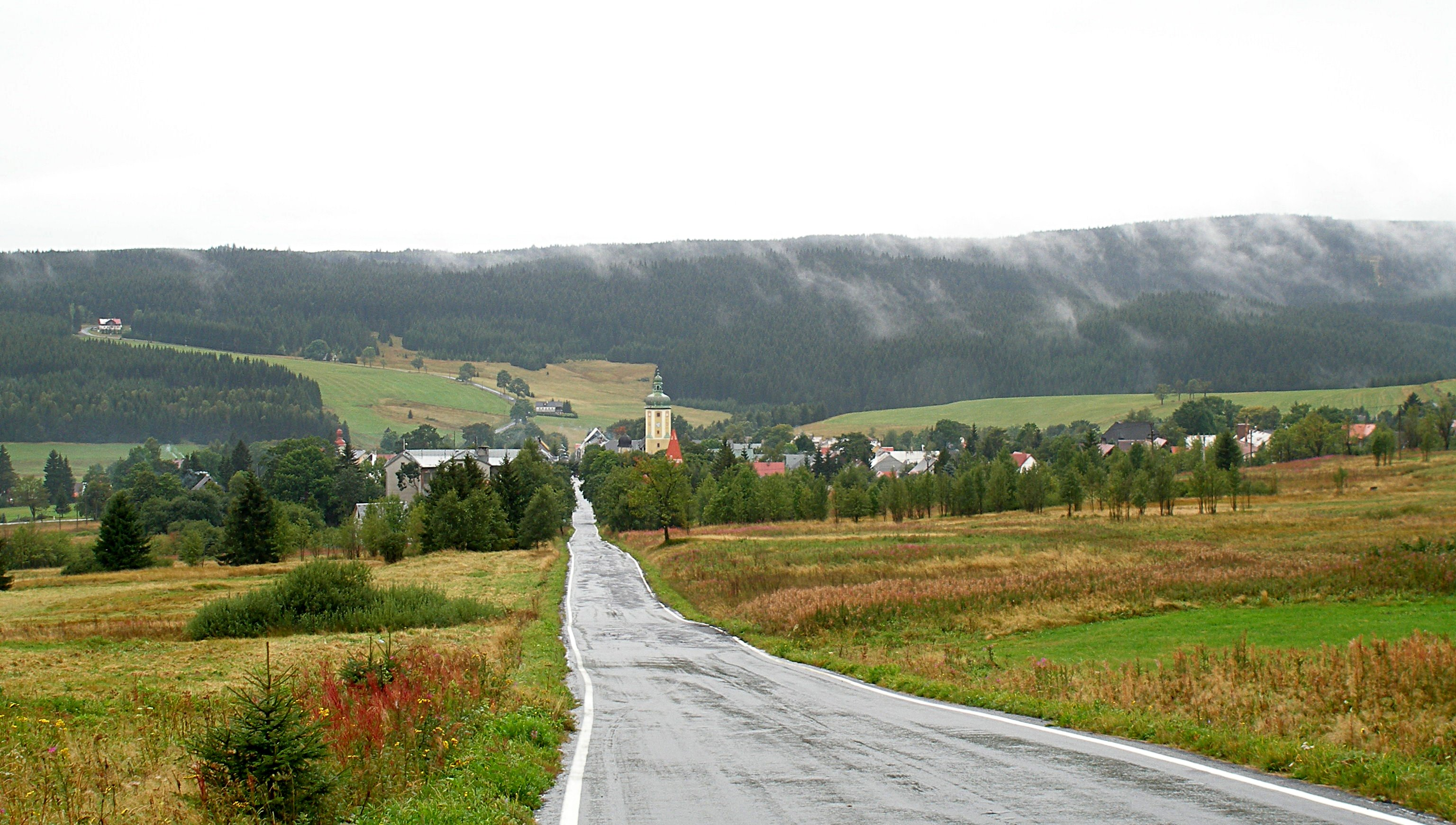
- General view of the town

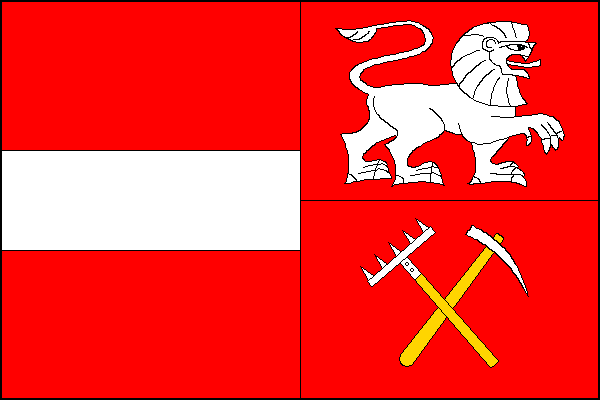
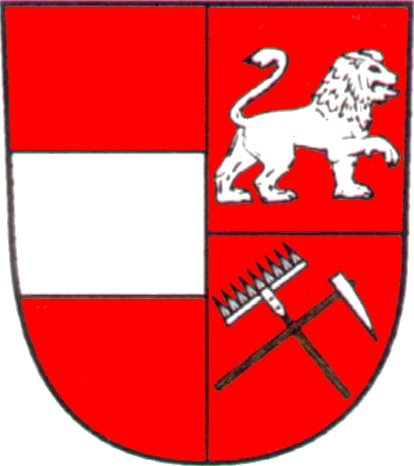
- Flag Coat of arms

- Location in the Czech Republic
- Coordinates: 50°23′23″N 12°46′3″E
- Country: Czech Republic
- Region: Karlovy Vary
- District: Karlovy Vary
- Founded: 1532

Government
  - Mayor: Robert Petro

Area
  - Total: 5.63 km^{2} (2.17 sq mi)
- Elevation: 888 m (2,913 ft)

Population (2026-01-01)
  - Total: 350
  - Density: 62/km^{2} (160/sq mi)
- Time zone: UTC+1 (CET)
  - Summer (DST): UTC+2 (CEST)
- Postal code: 362 37
- Website: www.horni-blatna.cz

UNESCO World Heritage Site
- Part of: Erzgebirge/Krušnohoří Mining Region
- Criteria: Cultural: (ii)(iii)(iv)
- Reference: 1478-019
- Inscription: 2019 (43rd Session)

Horní Blatná (Czech pronunciation: [ˈɦorɲiː ˈblatnaː]; German: Bergstadt Platten) is a town in Karlovy Vary District in the Karlovy Vary Region of the Czech Republic. It has about 400 inhabitants. The town is located in the Ore Mountains.

Horní Blatná is historically associated with tin mining and is located in the Ore Mountain Mining Region, which is a UNESCO World Heritage Site. The historic town centre is well preserved and is protected as an urban monument zone.

== Etymology ==
The name Blatná was probably derived from the Czech word blata (i.e. 'swamps') and referred to the location of the settlement. The adjective horní means here 'mining' and states that it was a mining settlement.

== Geography ==
Horní Blatná is located about 18 km (11 mi) north of Karlovy Vary. It lies in the Ore Mountains. The highest point is at 1,002 m (3,287 ft) above sea level. The stream Blatenský potok originates here and flows next to the town.

== History ==
The settlement of the area was closely connected with tin mining, the origins of which date back to the end of the 15th century. Horní Blatná was founded as a mining town in 1532. In 1548, it was promoted to a royal mining town by Emperor Ferdinand I and obtained various privileges.

The railway was opened in 1898. According to the census of 1921, the town had a population of 2,090 Germans, 14 Czechoslovaks and 58 foreigners. The vast majority of the inhabitants were Roman Catholics, complemented by 62 Protestants and two people without religion.

From 1938 to 1945, Horní Blatná was annexed by Nazi Germany and administered as part of the Reichsgau Sudetenland. After World War II, the town was returned to Czechoslovakia and the local German-speaking population was expelled.

== Demographics ==
Historical population

Year	Pop.	±%
1869	2,213	—
1880	2,340	+5.7%
1890	2,524	+7.9%
1900	2,771	+9.8%
1910	2,749	−0.8%

Year	Pop.	±%
1921	2,163	−21.3%
1930	2,341	+8.2%
1950	1,098	−53.1%
1961	813	−26.0%
1970	582	−28.4%

Year	Pop.	±%
1980	448	−23.0%
1991	367	−18.1%
2001	468	+27.5%
2011	474	+1.3%
2021	349	−26.4%

Source: Censuses

== Transport ==
Horní Blatná is located on the Karlovy Vary–Johanngeorgenstadt railway line.

== Sights ==
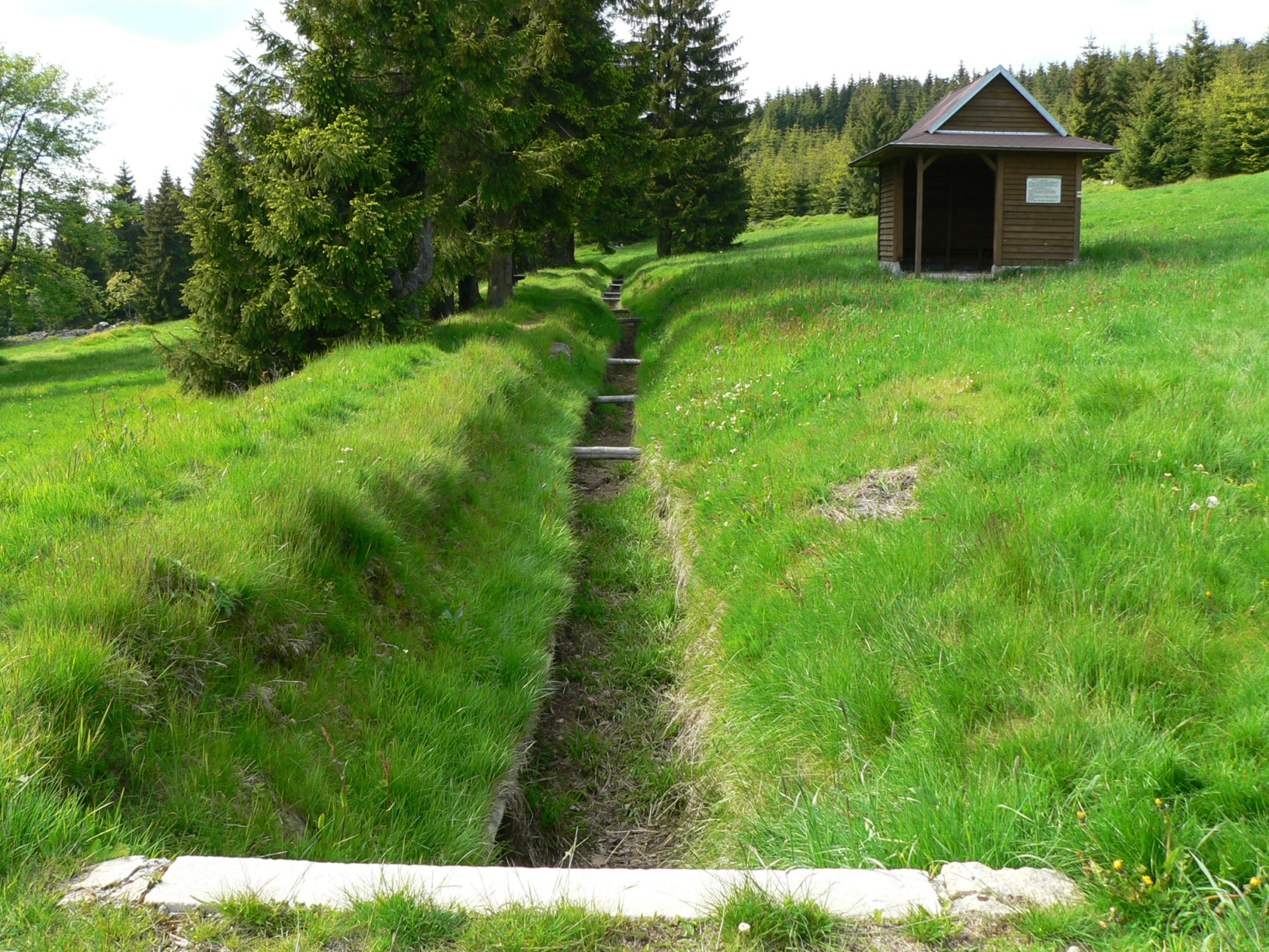
Blatenský water ditch in Horní Blatná

The town belongs to the so-called Abertamy – Boží Dar – Horní Blatná Mining Landscape, which is a UNESCO World Heritage Site as part of Ore Mountain Mining Region. The most valuable remnant of former mining in the area is the Blatenský water ditch. It is a technical monument, protected as a national cultural monument. It was built in 1540–1544 and was used for mining tin ore and for transporting wood. It is 11.6 km (7.2 mi) long and runs from Horní Blatná to Boží Dar. An educational trail runs along the ditch.

The main landmark of the town is the Church of Saint Lawrence. It was built in the Saxon Renaissance style in 1594, originally as a Protestant church. In 1686, it was consecrated as a Catholic church. In 1754, it was rebuilt in the Baroque style and sculptural decoration was added.

The Chapel of the Holy Cross is a large Baroque cemetery chapel from the first half of the 18th century.
