= Municipalities in Sudetenland =

The list below gives German names and Czech names of towns along with county names and other information in the Sudetenland from World War I through the era of World War II known as interwar Czechoslovakia.

German name	Czech name	County 1939	Governmental- District 1939	Part of the land	Market town since	Town since	Population 1939	Notes
Abertham	Abertamy	Neudek	Eger	Bohemia		1579–1945; 2007	2,939	
Aicha (Sudeten)	Český Dub	Reichenberg	Aussig	Bohemia			2,007	until 1943 Böhmisch Aicha
Asch	Aš	Asch	Eger	Bohemia		1872	23,123	
Arnau	Hostinné	Hohenelbe	Aussig	Bohemia			4,273	
Auscha	Úštěk	Leitmeritz	Aussig	Bohemia		1361	2,078	
Aussig	Ústí nad Labem	Aussig	Aussig	Bohemia			67,063	
Bad Königswart	Lázně Kynžvart	Marienbad	Eger	Bohemia			1,762	
Bärn	Moravský Beroun	Bärn	Troppau	Moravia			2,998	
Bärringen	Pernink	Neudek	Eger	Bohemia			3,102	
Bautsch	Budišov nad Budišovkou	Bärn	Troppau	Moravia			4,072	
Bennisch	Horní Benešov	Freudenthal	Troppau	Moravia			3,414	
Bensen	Benešov nad Ploučnicí	Tetschen-Bodenbach	Aussig	Bohemia		1392	4,083	
Bergstadt	Horní Město	Römerstadt	Troppau	Moravia		1580	1,251	
Bilin	Bílina	Bilin	Aussig	Bohemia		1263	9,125	
Bischofteinitz	Horšovský Týn	Bischofteinitz	Eger	Bohemia			2,995	
Bleistadt	Oloví	Falkenau an der Eger	Eger	Bohemia		1558	1,723	
Bodenbach	Podmokly	Tetschen-Bodenbach	Aussig	Bohemia			20,082	
Bodenstadt	Potštát	Bärn	Troppau	Moravia		1394	1,246	
Böhmisch Kamnitz	Česká Kamenice	Tetschen-Bodenbach	Aussig	Bohemia			4,360	
Böhmisch Leipa	Česká Lípa	BohemianLeipa	Eger	Bohemia		1381	12,000	
Böhmisch Wiesenthal	Loučná pod Klínovcem	Sankt Joachimsthal	Eger	Bohemia		1520	1,230	former: Böhmisch Wiesenthal
Braunau	Broumov	Braunau	Aussig	Bohemia			5,383	
Braunseifen	Ryžoviště	Römerstadt	Troppau	Moravia			1,586	
Brüsau	Březová nad Svitavou	Zwittau	Troppau	Moravia		1497	1,286	
Brüx	Most	Brüx	Aussig	Bohemia			36,454	
Buchau	Bochov	Luditz	Eger	Bohemia		bis 1947 ab 2006	1,673	
Chiesch	Chyše	Luditz	Eger	Bohemia		1475- ab 2007	1,156	
Chodau	Chodov	Elbogen	Eger	Bohemia			5,461	
Dauba	Dubá	Dauba	Aussig	Bohemia			1,474	
Domstadtl	Domašov nad Bystřicí	Bärn	Troppau	Moravia			1,065	
Dobrzan	Dobřany	Mies	Eger	Bohemia			5,443	to 1938:Wiesengrund
Duppau	Doupov	Kaaden	Eger	Bohemia		15__	1,453	Town no longer exists, today part of Military Training Area Hradiště
Dux	Duchcov	Dux	Aussig	Bohemia			9,646	
Eger	Cheb	Eger	Eger	Bohemia		1242	31,672	
Eidlitz	Údlice	Komotau	Aussig	Bohemia		1790	2,196	
Elbogen	Loket	Elbogen	Eger	Bohemia			3,594	
Einsiedl	Mnichov u Mariánských Lázní	Marienbad	Eger	Bohemia		1437	712	
Engelsberg	Andělská Hora ve Slezsku	Freudenthal	Troppau	Moravia		1553- 2008	1,410	
Falkenau an der Eger	Sokolov	Falkenau an der Eger	Eger	Bohemia			11,291	
Flöhau	Blšany	Podersam	Eger	Bohemia		13__–1945; 2006	793	
Franzensbad	Františkovy Lázně	Eger	Eger	Bohemia		1865	3,784	
Freiberg in Mähren	Příbor	Neu Titschein	Troppau	Moravia			4,313	
Freiheit	Svoboda nad Úpou	Trautenau	Aussig	Bohemia			1,271	
Freiwaldau	Jeseník	Freiwaldau	Troppau	Moravia		1506	7,440	until 1947 Frývaldov
Freudenthal	Bruntál	Freudenthal	Troppau	Moravia			9,569	
Friedeberg	Žulová	Freiwaldau	Troppau	Moravia		1793	1,612	
Friedland (Isergebirge)	Frýdlant v Čechách	Friedland (Isergebirge)	Aussig	Bohemia			5,829	
Frühbüß	Přebuz	Neudek	Eger	Bohemia		2007	1,320	
Fulnek	Fulnek	Neu Titschein	Troppau	Moravia			3,308	
Gablonz on the Neisse	Jablonec nad Nisou	Gablonz on the Neisse	Aussig	Bohemia	1808	1866	28,774	
Gastorf	Hoštka	Dauba	Aussig	Bohemia		1853–1945; 2006	950	
Georgswalde	Jiříkov	Rumburg	Aussig	Bohemia	1753	1914	7,683	
German Gabel	Jablonné v Podještědí	German Gabel	Aussig	Bohemia			2,159	
German Kralup	Kralupy u Chomutova	Komotau	Aussig	Bohemia			1,274	former: Německé Kralupy; no longer exists, today part of Málkov
Goldenstein	Branná	Moravia Schönberg	Troppau	Moravia			1,180	
Görkau	Jirkov	Komotau	Aussig	Bohemia		1507	6,334	
Gossengrün	Krajková	Falkenau an der Eger	Eger	Bohemia		1484	1,570	
Gottesgab	Boží Dar	Sankt Joachimsthal	Eger	Bohemia		1520	938	
Graber	Kravaře v Čechách	Leitmeritz	Aussig	Bohemia			861	
Graslitz	Kraslice	Graslitz	Eger	Bohemia		1370	12,597	
Graupen	Krupka	Teplitz-Schönau	Aussig	Bohemia			3,905	
Groß Schönau	Velký Šenov	Schluckenau	Aussig	Bohemia		1907	4,459	
Grottau	Hrádek nad Nisou	Reichenberg	Aussig	Bohemia		1260	3,718	
Grulich	Králíky	Grulich	Troppau	Moravia			3,427	
Haid	Bor u Tachova	Tachau	Eger	Bohemia			1,942	
Haida	Nový Bor	BohemianLeipa	Eger	Bohemia	1757		6,677	
Haindorf	Hejnice	Friedland (Isergebirge)	Aussig	Bohemia			2,404	
Hainspach	Lipová u Šluknova	Schluckenau	Aussig	Bohemia			2,401	
Heinrichsgrün	Jindrichovice	Graslitz	Eger	Bohemia			1,652	
Hermannstadt	Hermanovice	Freiwaldau	Troppau	Moravia			2,148	
Hof	Dvorce u Bruntálu	Bärn	Troppau	Moravia		1406	2,460	
Hohenelbe	Vrchlabí	Hohenelbe	Aussig	Bohemia		1533	6,333	
Hohenstadt	Zábřeh	Hohenstadt	Troppau	Moravia		1275	6,554	
Hostau	Hostouň	Bischofteinitz	Eger	Bohemia	1522	1587	951	
Hotzenpplotz	Osoblaha	Jägerndorf	Troppau	Moravia		~1250	2,138	
Jägerndorf	Krnov	Jägerndorf	Troppau	Moravia			24,174	
Jauernig	Javorník	Freiwaldau	Troppau	Moravia		1549	2,923	
Jechnitz	Jesenice	Podersam	Eger	Bohemia			1,507	
Johannesberg	Janov nad Nisou	Gablonz on the Neisse	Aussig	Bohemia			2,371	
Johannesthal	Janov	Jägerndorf	Troppau	Moravia		1535–19__; 2007	1,158	
Kaaden	Kadaň	Kaaden	Eger	Bohemia			7,650	
Karbitz	Chabarovice	Aussig	Aussig	Bohemia		vor 1520	5,138	
Karlsbad	Karlovy Vary	Karlsbad	Eger	Bohemia		1370	53,339	
Katharinaberg	Hora Svaté Kateřiny	Brüx	Aussig	Bohemia		2008	1,470	
Kladrau	Kladruby u Stříbra	Mies	Eger	Bohemia		–1960; 2007	1,193	
Klostergrab	Hrob	Dux	Aussig	Bohemia		1594	2,811	
Klösterle an der Eger	Klášterec nad Ohří	Kaaden	Eger	Bohemia			3,983	
Komotau	Chomutov	Komotau	Aussig	Bohemia		1396	31,317	
Königsberg an der Eger	Kynšperk nad Ohří	Falkenau an der Eger	Eger	Bohemia		1364	5,236	
Königsberg in Schlesien	Klimkovice	Wagstadt	Troppau	Moravia			2,913	
Kopitz	Kopisty	Brüx	Aussig	Bohemia		1911	6,752	No longer exists, today part of Most
Kratzau	Chrastava	Reichenberg	Aussig	Bohemia		1527	4,339	
Kreibitz	Chřibská	Warnsdorf	Aussig	Bohemia		1570	1,365	
Kriegern	Kryry	Podersam	Eger	Bohemia		2007	2,501	
Kupferberg	Měděnec	Preßnitz	Aussig	Bohemia			1,137	
Ladowitz	Ledvice	Dux	Aussig	Bohemia	1898	1911	3,340	
Landskron	Lanškroun	Landskron	Troppau	Bohemia			6,210	
Lauterbach	Čistá u Rovné	Elbogen	Eger	Bohemia		1551	1,019	former: Litrbachy; no longer exists
Leitmeritz	Litoměřice	Leitmeritz	Aussig	Bohemia		1227	17,267	
Leskau	Lestkov	Tepl	Eger	Bohemia			820	
Liebenau	Hodkovice nad Mohelkou	Reichenberg	Aussig	Bohemia			2,013	
Lobositz	Lovosice	Leitmeritz	Aussig	Bohemia		1600	5,144	
Luditz	Žlutice	Luditz	Eger	Bohemia		1341	1,970	
Mährisch Altstadt	Staré Město pod Sněžníkem	Schönberg (Moravia)	Troppau	Moravia		1336	2,250	
Mährisch Aussee	Úsov	Hohenstadt	Troppau	Moravia			1,420	
Mährisch-Neustadt	Uničov	Sternberg (Moravia)	Troppau	Moravia			4,442	
Mährisch Schönberg	Šumperk	Schönberg (Moravia)	Troppau	Moravia			15,611	
Mährisch Trübau	Moravská Třebová	Trübau (Moravia)	Troppau	Moravia			8,199	
Marienbad	Mariánské Lázne	Marienbad	Eger	Bohemia		1866	7,706	
Maschau	Mašťov	Podersam	Eger	Bohemia		2007	910	
Michelsberg	Michalovy Hory	Tachau	Eger	Bohemia			625	
Mies	Stříbro	Mies	Eger	Bohemia		~1245	5,662	
Morchenstern	Smržovka	Gablonz on the Neisse	Aussig	Bohemia		1905	6,719	
Müglitz	Mohelnice	Hohenstadt	Troppau	Moravia		1250	4,325	
Neudek	Nejdek	Neudek	Eger	Bohemia		1602	8,441	
Neumarkt	Úterý	Tepl	Eger	Bohemia		–1949; 2007	824	
Neustadt an der Tafelfichte	Nové Město pod Smrkem	Friedland (Isergebirge)	Aussig	Bohemia		1592	3,905	
Neu Titschein	Nový Jičín	Neu Titschein	Troppau	Moravia		1313	12,925	
Niedereinsiedel	Dolní Poustevna	Schluckenau	Aussig	Bohemia			2,626	
Niedergeorgenthal	Dolní Jiřetín	Brüx	Aussig	Bohemia	1571	1862	3,099	From 1943 to Obergeorgenthal; no longer exists, today part of Horní Jiřetín
Niemes	Mimoň	German Gabel	Aussig	Bohemia			5,964	
Niklasberg	Mikulov	Teplitz-Schönau	Aussig	Bohemia			561	
Nixdorf	Mikulášovice	Schluckenau	Aussig	Bohemia		1916	6,160	
Nürschan	Nýřany	Mies	Eger	Bohemia			4,042	
Obergeorgenthal	Horní Jiřetín	Brüx	Aussig	Bohemia		2006	3,357	
Oberleutensdorf	Horní Litvínov	Brüx	Aussig	Bohemia		1852	8,284	
Odrau	Odry	Neu Titschein	Troppau	Moravia			4,134	
Olbersdorf	Město Albrechtice	Jägerndorf	Troppau	Moravia			2,582	
Oschitz	Osečná	Reichenberg	Aussig	Bohemia			601	
Ossegg	Osek	Dux	Aussig	Bohemia			7,701	
Petschau	Bečov nad Teplou	Tepl	Eger	Bohemia			2,158	
Pilnikau	Pilníkov	Trautenau	Aussig	Bohemia			1,748	
Plan	Planá u Mariánských Lázní	Tachau	Eger	Bohemia			4,110	
Platten	Horní Blatná	Neudek	Eger	Bohemia		2007	2,210	
Podersam	Podborany	Podersam	Eger	Bohemia		1575	3,198	
Postelberg	Postoloprty	Saaz	Eger	Bohemia			2,561	
Preßnitz	Přísečnice	Preßnitz	Aussig	Bohemia		1352	2,486	
Priesen	Březno	Komotau	Aussig	Bohemia			1,269	
Puschwitz	Buškovice	Podersam	Eger	Bohemia			1,307	
Radonitz	Radonice u Kadaně	Kaaden	Eger	Bohemia			858	
Reichenau	Rychnov u Jablonce nad Nisou	Gablonz on the Neisse	Aussig	Bohemia			3,063	
Reichenberg	Liberec	Reichenberg	Aussig	Bohemia		1577	69,195	
Reichstadt	Zákupy	German Gabel	Aussig	Bohemia			1,904	
Rokitnitz im Adlergebirge	Rokytnice v Orlických horách	Grulich	Troppau	Moravia			1,025	
Römerstadt	Rýmařov	Römerstadt	Troppau	Moravia			5,858	
Ronsperg	Poběžovice	Bischofteinitz	Eger	Bohemia	1424	1502	2,995	
Rudig	Vroutek	Podersam	Eger	Bohemia			2,152	
Rumburg	Rumburk	Rumburg	Aussig	Bohemia		1347	9,453	
Saaz	Žatec	Saaz	Eger	Bohemia			16,247	
Sandau	Žandov	BohemianLeipa	Eger	Bohemia		14__	1,306	
Sangersberg	Prameny	Marienbad	Eger	Bohemia		1380	1,422	
Sankt Georgenthal	Jiříkov	Warnsdorf	Aussig	Bohemia		1914	2,134	
Sankt Joachimsthal	Jáchymov	Sankt Joachimsthal	Eger	Bohemia		1520	6,388	
Schatzlar	Žacléř	Trautenau	Aussig	Bohemia			3,217	
Scheles	Žihle	Podersam	Eger	Bohemia			1,121	
Schildberg	Štíty	Hohenstadt	Troppau	Moravia			1,366	
Schlaggenwald	Horní Slavkov	Elbogen	Eger	Bohemia		1547	3,022	
Schluckenau	Šluknov	Schluckenau	Aussig	Bohemia		1359	5,319	
Schönbach	Luby	Eger	Eger	Bohemia			4,268	
Schönfeld	Krásno nad Teplou	Elbogen	Eger	Bohemia		1380	1,995	
Schönlinde	Krásná Lípa	Rumburg	Aussig	Bohemia	1731	1870	6,076	
Schönthal	Krásné Údolí	Tepl	Eger	Bohemia			457	
Schumburg an der Desse	Šumburk nad Desnou	Gablonz on the Neisse	Aussig	Bohemia			2,851	1942 Tannwald
Sebastiansberg	Hora Svatého Šebestiána	Komotau	Aussig	Bohemia		1597-	1,226	
Seestadtl	Ervěnice	Komotau	Aussig	Bohemia			4,221	No longer exists, today part of Most
Sonnenberg	Výsluní	Komotau	Aussig	Bohemia		1565–1945; 2007	1,240	former Suniperk
Staab	Stod	Mies	Eger	Bohemia		1850	2,839	
Stadt Liebau	Město Libavá	Bärn	Troppau	Moravia			2,998	
Starkstadt	Stárkov	Braunau	Aussig	Bohemia		1573	750	
Stein-Schönau	Kamenický Šenov	Tetschen-Bodenbach	Aussig	Bohemia		1900	4,936	
Sternberg	Šternberk	Sternberg (Moravia)	Troppau	Moravia			12,141	
Stramberg	Štramberk	Neu Titschein	Troppau	Moravia			3,524	
Tachau	Tachov	Tachau	Eger	Bohemia			6,425	
Tannwald	Tanvald	Gablonz on the Neisse	Aussig	Bohemia		1905	6,069	
Tepl	Teplá	Tepl	Eger	Bohemia		1385	2,475	
Teplitz-Schönau	Teplice	Teplitz-Schönau	Aussig	Bohemia			26,281	
Tetschen	Děčín	Tetschen-Bodenbach	Aussig	Bohemia		13__	12,647	
Theusing	Toužim	Tepl	Eger	Bohemia		1469	1,911	
Trautenau	Trutnov	Trautenau	Aussig	Bohemia			14,811	
Troppau	Opava	Stadtkreis	Troppau	Moravia		1224	44,740	
Tschernoschin	Černošín	Mies	Eger	Bohemia		1846	1,529	
Turn	Trnovany	Teplitz-Schönau	Aussig	Bohemia			14,125	
Tuschkau	Město Touškov	Mies	Eger	Bohemia		1543	1,754	
Unter Sandau	Dolní Žandov	Marienbad	Eger	Bohemia			1,467	
Wagstadt	Bílovec	Wagstadt	Troppau	Moravia		~1320	4,607	
Warnsdorf	Varnsdorf	Warnsdorf	Aussig	Bohemia		1868	21,179	
Wartenberg am Roll	Stráž pod Ralskem	German Gabel	Aussig	Bohemia			1,141	
Wegstädtl	Štětí	Dauba	Aussig	Bohemia			1,684	
Weidenau	Vidnava	Freiwaldau	Troppau	Moravia		1428	2,158	
Weipert	Vejprty	Preßnitz	Aussig	Bohemia		1607	10,667	
Wernstadt	Verneřice	Tetschen-Bodenbach	Aussig	Bohemia		1847	1,401	
Weseritz	Bezdružice	Tepl	Eger	Bohemia		2006	980	
Wiesenthal on the Neisse	Lucany nad Nisou	Gablonz on the Neisse	Aussig	Bohemia		2006	3,467	
Wigstadtl	Vítkov	Troppau	Troppau	Moravia	1523		4,490	
Wildstein	Skalná	Eger	Eger	Bohemia	1865	1905	2,452	to 1950 Vildštejn
Willomitz	Vilémov	Kaaden	Eger	Bohemia			882	
Wölmsdorf	Vilémov	Schluckenau	Aussig	Bohemia			1,435	
Wscherau	Všeruby u Plzně	Mies	Eger	Bohemia			933	
Würbenthal	Vrbno pod Pradědem	Freudenthal	Troppau	Moravia			4,029	
Zuckmantel	Zlaté Hory	Freiwaldau	Troppau	Moravia		1306	4,363	
Zwickau in Bohemia	Cvikov	German Gabel	Aussig	Bohemia		1391	4,273	
Zwittau	Svitavy	Zwittau	Troppau	Moravia			10,405	

== Southern Sudetenland ==
German name	Czech name	County 1939	Governmental- District 1939	Part of the Country	Market town since	Town since	Population 1939	Notes
Auspitz	Hustopeče	Nikolsburg	Lower Danube	Moravia		1572	2,971	
Bergreichenstein	Kašperské Hory	Bergreichenstein	Lower Bavaria	Bohemia			2,635	
Deutsch Beneschau	Benešov nad Černou	Kaplitz	Upper Danube	Bohemia		1881-	1,538	
Feldsberg	Valtice	Nikolsburg	Lower Danube	Moravia			2,857	
Gratzen	Nové Hrady	Kaplitz	Upper Danube	Bohemia			1,170	
Hohenfurth	Vyšší Brod	Kaplitz	Upper Danube	Bohemia		-195_; 1994	1,937	
Kaplitz	Kaplice	Kaplitz	Upper Danube	Bohemia		1382	2,281	
Krummau	Český Krumlov	Krummau	Upper Danube	Bohemia			8,368	
Lundenburg	Břeclav	Nikolsburg	Lower Danube	Moravia	1526	1872	10,583	
Mährisch Kromau	Moravský Krumlov	Znaim	Lower Danube	Moravia		1260	2,849	
Neubistritz	Nová Bystřice	Neubistritz	Lower Danube	Moravia		1341	2,824	
Neuern	Nýrsko	Markt Eisenstein	Lower Bavaria	Bohemia			3,443	
Neumark	Všeruby u Kdyne	Markt Eisenstein	Lower Bavaria	Bohemia			816	
Nikolsburg	Mikulov	Nikolsburg	Lower Danube	Moravia			7,886	
Pohrlitz	Pohořelice	Nikolsburg	Lower Danube	Moravia		1350	3,189	
Prachatitz	Prachatice	Prachatitz	Lower Bavaria	Bohemia		1436	4,442	
Proßmeritz	Prosiměřice	Znaim	Lower Danube	Moravia			1,431	
Rosenberg an der Moldau	Rožmberk nad Vltavou	Kaplitz	Upper Danube	Bohemia			985	
Unterrreichenstein	Rejštejn	Bergreichenstein	Lower Bavaria	Bohemia		1584	1,006	
Wallern	Volary	Prachatitz	Lower Bavaria	Bohemia		1871	4,099	
Winterberg	Vimperk	Prachatitz	Lower Bavaria	Bohemia			4,581	
Zlabings	Slavonice	Waidhofen an der Thaya	Lower Danube	Moravia			2,216	
Znaim	Znojmo	Znaim	Lower Danube	Moravia		1226	23,770	
