= Viska =

Viska or Víska may refer to:

== Places in the Czech Republic ==
- Víska (Havlíčkův Brod District), a municipality and village in the Vysočina Region
- Víska u Jevíčka, a municipality and village in the Pardubice Region
- Víska, a village and part of Březovice in the Central Bohemian Region
- Víska, a village and part of Čmelíny in the Plzeň Region
- Víska, a village and part of Chrastava in the Liberec Region
- Víska, a village and part of Kněžice (Jihlava District) in the Vysočina Region
- Víska, a village and part of Kravaře (Česká Lípa District) in the Liberec Region
- Víska, a village and part of Litovel in the Olomouc Region
- Víska, a village and part of Nová Ves (Strakonice District) in the South Bohemian Region
- Víska, a village and part of Sedlec-Prčice in the Central Bohemian Region
- Víska, a village and part of Višňová (Liberec District) in the Liberec Region
- Víska, a village and part of Vysoký Chlumec in the Central Bohemian Region
- Víska pod Lesy, a village and part of Česká Kamenice in the Ústí nad Labem Region
- Malá Víska, a municipality and village in the Central Bohemian Region

== People ==
- Mark Viska, Australian rules footballer

== See also ==
- Visky (disambiguation)
