= Visky =

Visky or Vísky may refer to:

== Places in the Czech Republic ==
- Vísky (Blansko District), a municipality and village in the South Moravian Region
- Vísky (Rokycany District), a municipality and village in the Plzeň Region

== People ==
- András Visky (born 1957), Romanian poet and playwright

== See also ==
- Viska (disambiguation)
