= County Römerstadt =

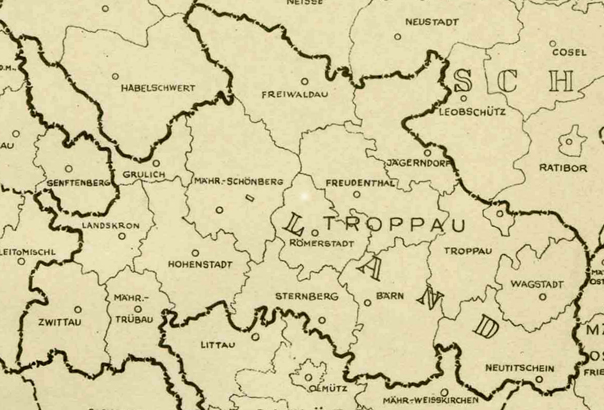
Map of the historic Sudeten counties of Northern Moravia, including that of County Römerstadt

Römerstadt was a county in the Sudetenland administered by the Sudeten Germans during the period from 1938 to 1945.

As of January 1, 1945, the county included:

- 3 cities
- 58 other communities

The county seat, Römerstadt, had the following population figures:

- December 1, 1930 — 27,584 inhabitants
- May 17, 1939 — 26,936 inhabitants
- May 22, 1947 — 15,541 inhabitants

== Political history ==
=== Czechoslovakia / German occupation ===
Before the Munich Agreement of September 29, 1938, the county of Römerstadt was part of the political district of Rýmařov in Czechoslovakia.

Between 1 and 10 October 1938, German troops occupied the area. The political district, known today as Rýmařov, previously bore the Austro-German name Römerstadt, which also referred to the judicial district centered in the town of Römerstadt (Rýmařov).

After November 20, 1938, the political district was officially renamed Römerstadt and placed under the administration of a military chief — the Commander of the Army, Colonel General Walther von Brauchitsch.

=== German Empire ===
On 21 November, the territory of the county Römerstadt was formally integrated into the German Reich and became part of the administrative district of the Sudetenland under the national commissioner Konrad Henlein. The county administration office was located in the town of Römerstadt.

After 15 April 1939, the Law on the Construction of Administration in the Reich Sudetenland (Sudetengaugesetz) was enacted. Following this, the county of Römerstadt became part of the Reichsgau Sudetenland, which was assigned to the newly created administrative district of Opava.

On 1 May 1939, a restructuring of certain counties in the Sudetenland was decreed. As a result, the county of Römerstadt was restored to its previous boundaries.

It remained in this state until the end of World War II.

Since 1945, the area has once again belonged to Czechoslovakia. Today it is part of the Czech Republic.

== Communal Constitution ==
On the day before the formal incorporation into the German Reich, namely on 20 November 1938, all municipalities adopted the provisions of the German Municipal Code of 30 January 1935, which implemented the leadership principle (Führerprinzip) at the local level.

== Place names ==
There were the more recent place names, in the Austro-German version of 1918.

== Localities ==
Population (1930/1939)

=== Cities ===
1. Bergstadt (1,296/1,250)
2. Braunseifen (1,604/1,586)
3. Römerstadt (5,837/5,858)

=== Communities ===
1. Altendorf (1,635/1,646)
2. Andersdorf (488/473)
3. Arnsdorf (326/317)
4. Brandseifen (393/353)
5. Deutsch Eisenberg [German Eisenberg] (592/541)
6. Doberseik (419/387)
7. Edersdorf (522/521)
8. Eichhorn (138/174)
9. Eulenberg, Markt (276/245)
10. Friedland an der Mohra, Markt (1,654/1,751)
11. Friedrichsdorf (605/556)
12. Girsig (333/372)
13. Groß Stohl [Large Stohl] (743/731)
14. Hangenstein (406/374)
15. Herzogsdorf (304/298)
16. Irmsdorf (586/549)
17. Janowitz (412/453)
18. Johnsdorf (1,365/1,377)
19. Karlsdorf (429/372)
20. Klein Stohl [Small Stohl] (160/149)
21. Kreuz (157/145)
22. Kriegsdorf (583/534)
23. Lobnig (1,064/ 980)
24. Mährisch Kotzendorf [Moravian Kotzendorf] (658/638)
25. Merotein (190/191)
26. Neudorf (481/470)
27. Neufang (359/355)
28. Nieder Mohrau [Lower Mohrau] (751/804)
29. Ober Mohrau [Upper Mohrau] (278/303)
30. Olbersdorf (315/292)
31. Pürkau (366/349)
32. Reschen (434/428)
33. Tillendorf (339/328)
34. Weigelsdorf (198/206)
35. Zechan (212/207)
36. Zechitz (405/380)

== Literature ==
- Otakar Káňa. Historické proměny pohraničí: Vývoj pohraničních okresů Jeseník, Rýmařov, Bruntál a Krnov po roce 1945. Profil 1976.
- Josef Bartoš et al. Historický místopis Moravy a Slezska v letech 1848-1960. Sv. 4, okresy: Šumperk, Zábřeh, Rýmařov. Profil, Ostrava 1974.
- Jaroslav Vencálek. Okres Bruntál. Okresní úřad, Bruntál 1998. ISBN 80-238-2542-9
