= Hustopeče =

- Town
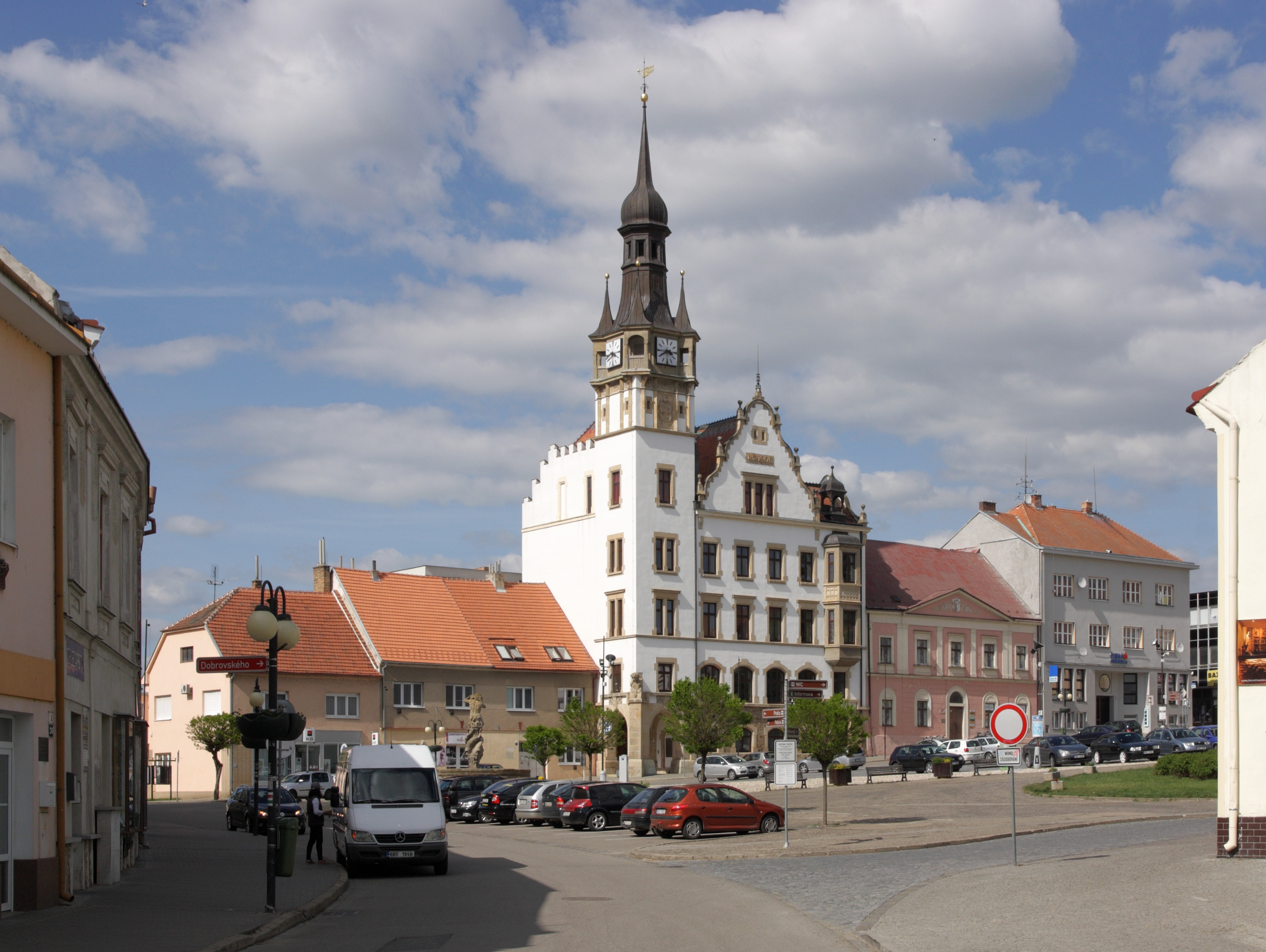
- Main square with the town hall

- Flag Coat of arms

- Location in the Czech Republic
- Coordinates: 48°56′27″N 16°44′15″E
- Country: Czech Republic
- Region: South Moravian
- District: Břeclav
- First mentioned: 1247

Government
  - Mayor: Hana Potměšilová

Area
  - Total: 24.53 km^{2} (9.47 sq mi)
- Elevation: 215 m (705 ft)

Population (2026-01-01)
  - Total: 6,391
  - Density: 260.5/km^{2} (674.8/sq mi)
- Time zone: UTC+1 (CET)
  - Summer (DST): UTC+2 (CEST)
- Postal code: 693 01
- Website: www.hustopece.cz

Hustopeče (Czech pronunciation: [ˈɦustopɛtʃɛ]; German: Auspitz) is a town in Břeclav District in the South Moravian Region of the Czech Republic. It has about 6,400 inhabitants. The town is located on the border between the Ždánice Forest and Lower Morava Valley. It is known for fruit and wine growing.

Hustopeče became a town in 1572. The main landmark of the town is the Church of Saints Wenceslaus and Agnes of Bohemia.

== Etymology ==
The name of the town is derived from the name of the nobleman and alleged founder of Hustopeče, named Úsopek.

== Geography ==
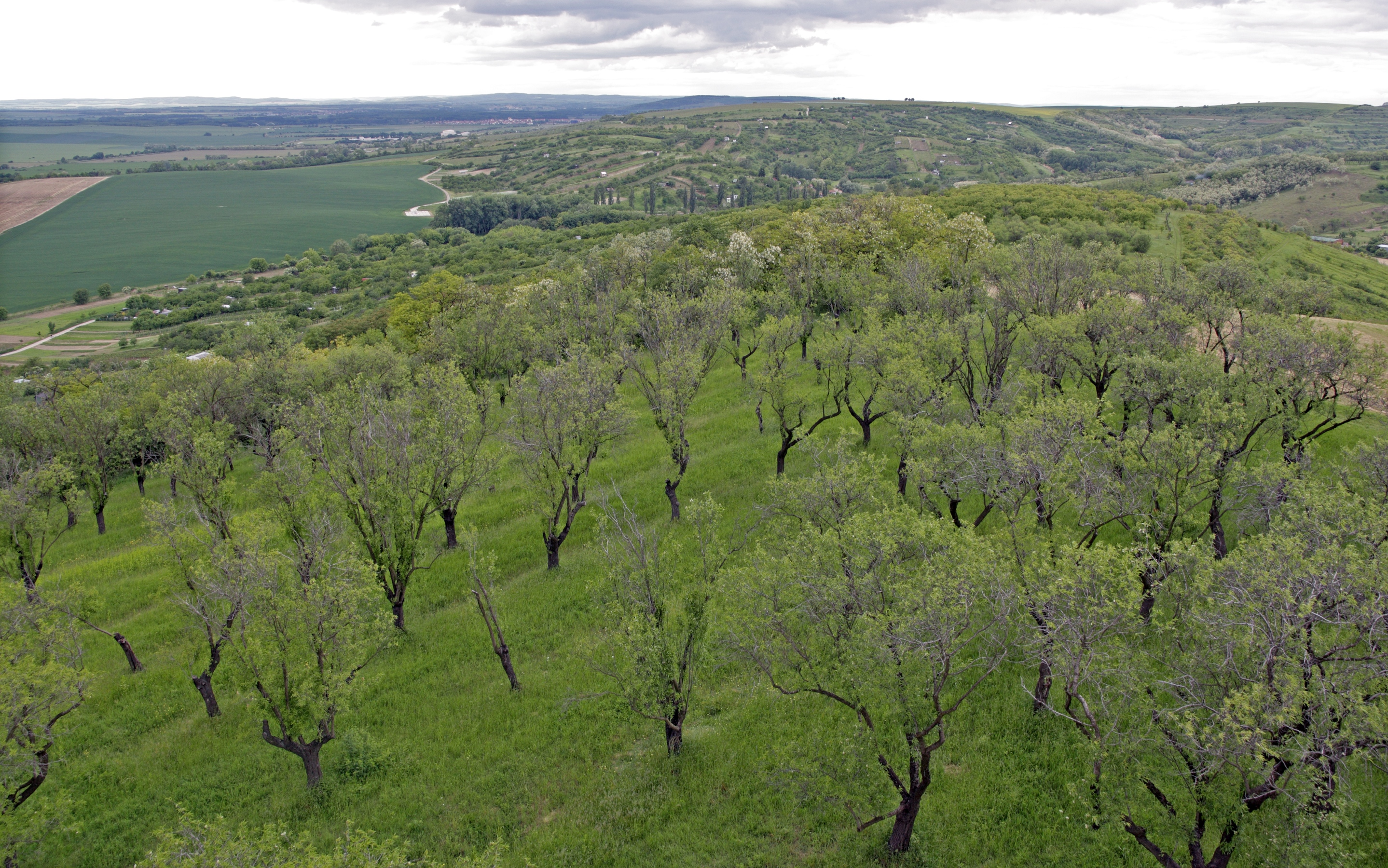
Almond tree orchard

Hustopeče is located about 25 kilometres (16 mi) northwest of Břeclav and 28 km (17 mi) south of Brno. The northern part of the municipal territory lies within the southern foothills of the Ždánice Forest range and the southern part lies in the Lower Morava Valley lowland. The town lies in the warmest part of the Czech Republic.

== History ==
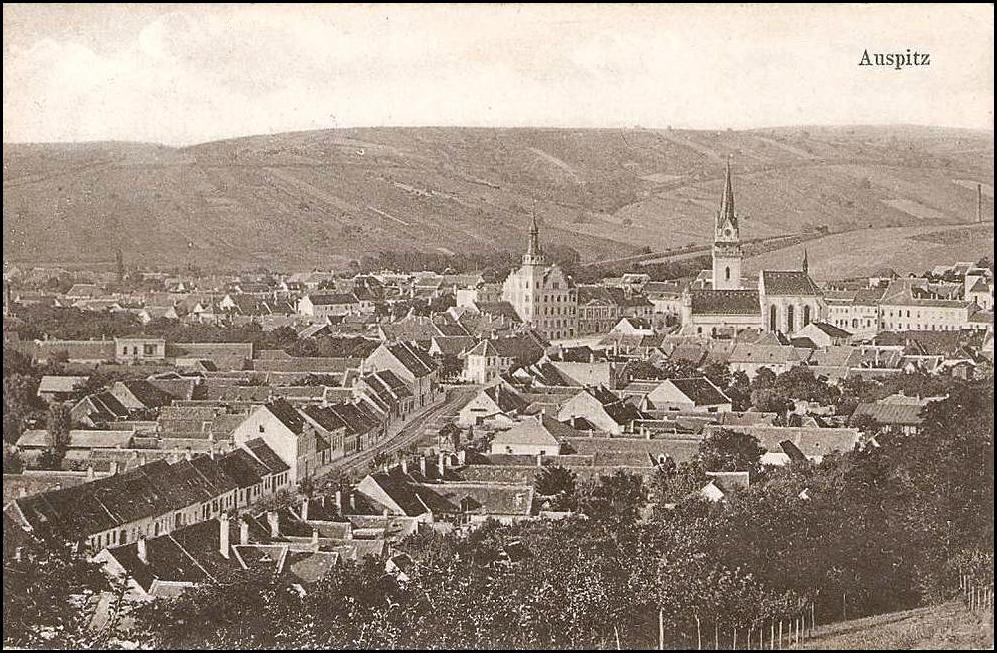
Hustopeče in 1909

The first written mention of Hustopeče is from 1247. In the 13th century, the area was settled by German colonisers, who brought viticulture here. The German name of Hustopeče Auspitz was first documented in 1279.

From the beginning of the 14th century until 1599, Hustopeče was owned by the Cistercian abbey in Brno. The advantageous location on the border of three countries made Hustopeče an important economic centre with markets. In 1572, Emperor Maximilian II promoted Hustopeče to a town. From 1599 to 1848, Hustopeče was property of the Liechtenstein family.

In 1531, Anabaptists led by Jakob Hutter came into the town from Tyrol and Carinthia, and founded a Hutterite community. Hustopeče became the centre of Moravian Anabaptists.

Hustopeče was badly damaged during the Thirty Years' War During this period, the acreage of vineyards fell to 10% of its original state. However, winemaking gradually recovered, and in the mid-18th century, Hustopeče was the largest wine-growing municipality in Moravia. In 1726, the winemaking guild was established.

In 1756, the Piarists established a first gymnasium here. On 18 July 1894, Hustopeče received access to a Lokalbahn branch line to Šakvice and the Emperor Ferdinand Northern Railway from Vienna to Prague. According to the 1910 census, most of its inhabitants were ethnic Germans.

After World War I and the dissolution of Austria-Hungary, large parts of the South Moravian region were claimed by the newly established Republic of German-Austria; nevertheless, according to the 1919 Treaty of Saint-Germain, Hustopeče and it surroundings passed the First Czechoslovak Republic. After the Munich Agreement in 1938, it was occupied by Nazi Germany and incorporated into Reichsgau Niederdonau as one of the municipalities in Sudetenland. After World War II, Hustopeče returned to Czechoslovakia and the remaining German-speaking population was expelled according to the Beneš decrees.

== Demographics ==
Historical population

Year	Pop.	±%
1869	3,106	—
1880	3,302	+6.3%
1890	3,654	+10.7%
1900	3,603	−1.4%
1910	3,473	−3.6%

Year	Pop.	±%
1921	3,494	+0.6%
1930	3,719	+6.4%
1950	2,652	−28.7%
1961	3,174	+19.7%
1970	3,804	+19.8%

Year	Pop.	±%
1980	5,251	+38.0%
1991	5,868	+11.8%
2001	5,881	+0.2%
2011	5,746	−2.3%
2021	6,076	+5.7%

Source: Censuses

== Economy ==
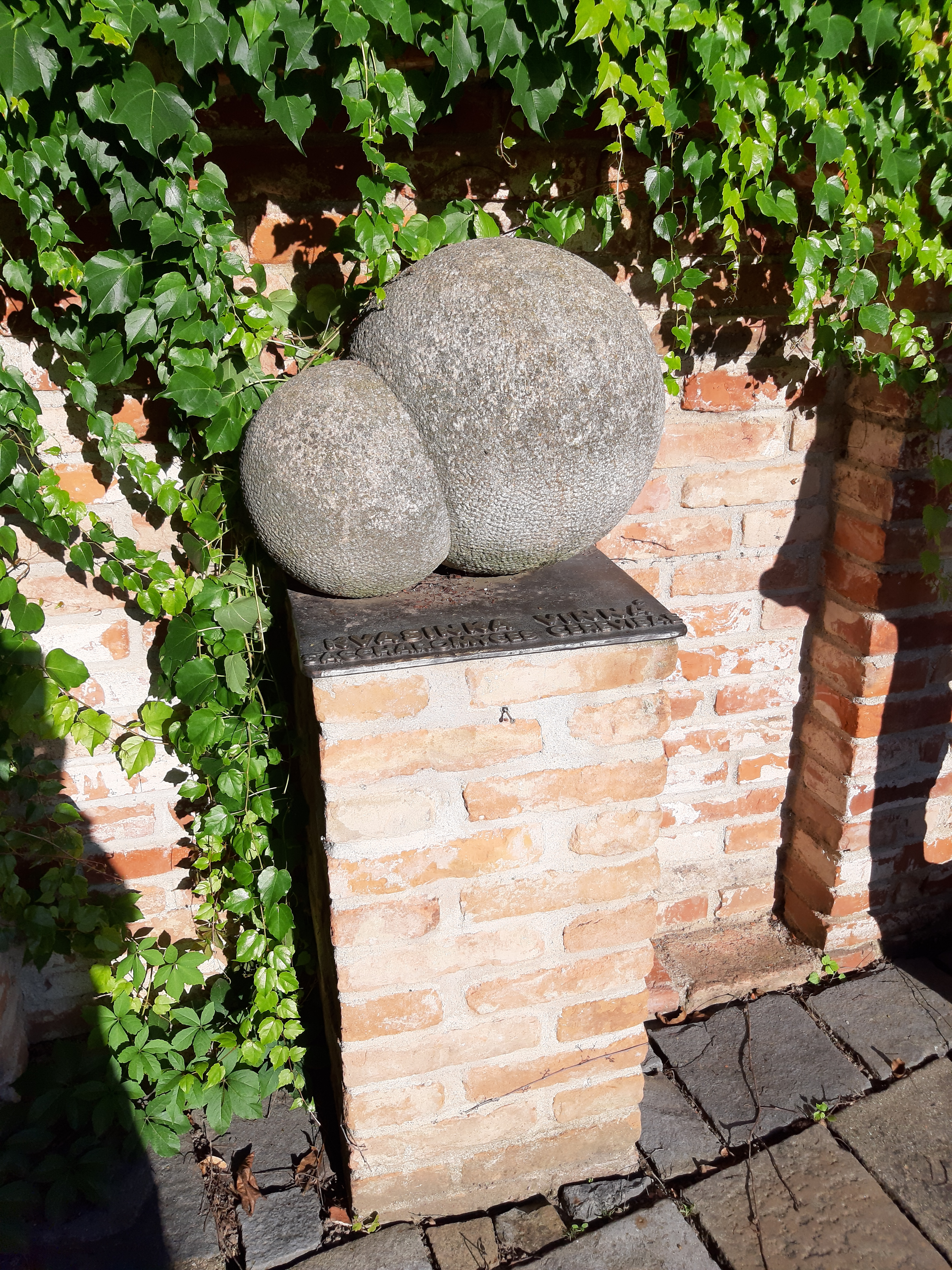
Statue of Saccharomyces cerevisiae

Hustopeče is known for viticulture and also for almond growing, which is unique in Central Europe.

== Transport ==
The D2 motorway from Brno to the Czech–Slovak border in Lanžhot runs through the town.

Hustopeče is a terminus and starting point of the railway line from/to Křižanov via Brno.

== Sport ==
Each year, Hustopeče is host to the world's best high jumpers competing in the Moravia High Jump Tour.

== Sights ==
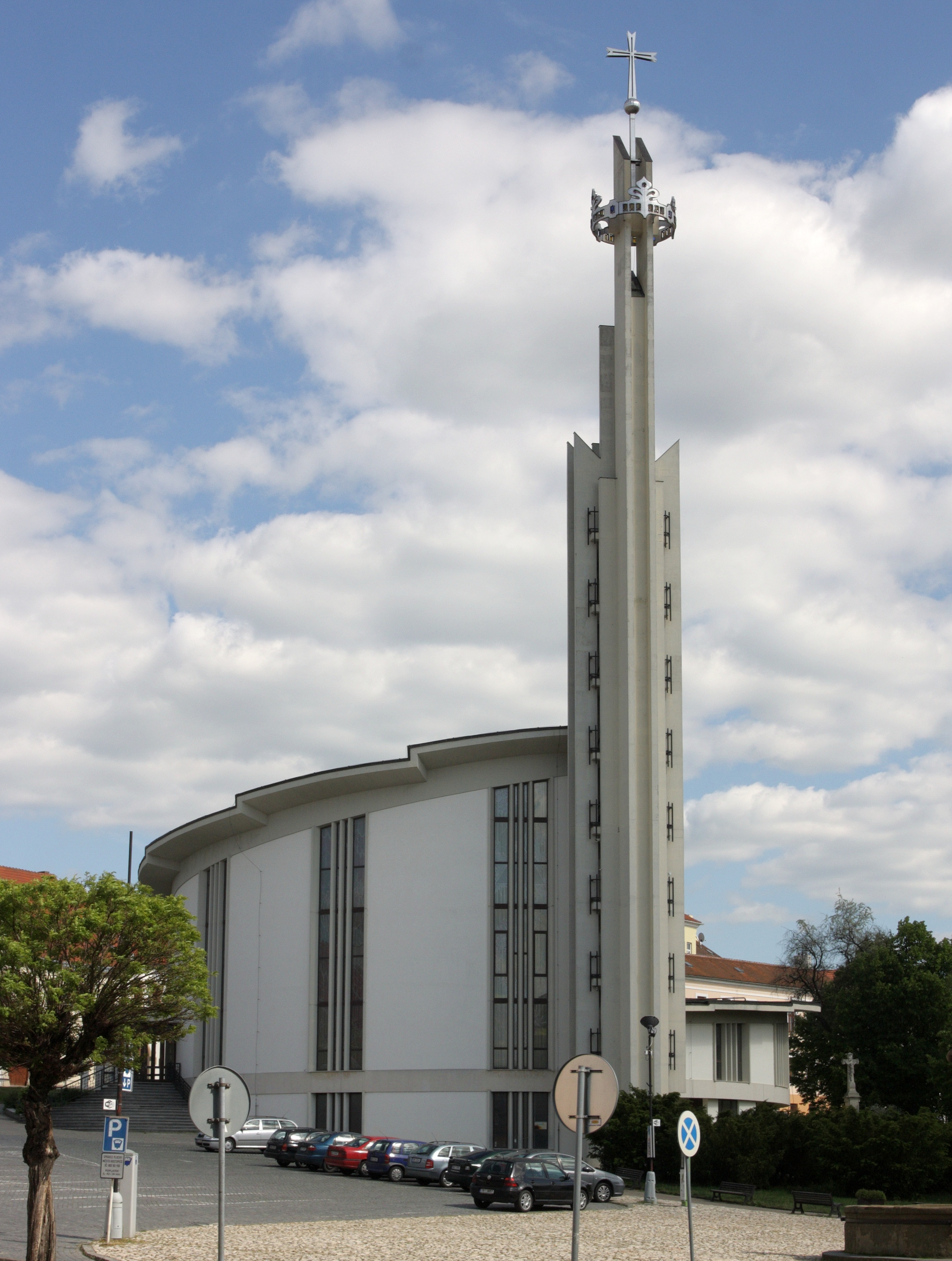
Church of Saints Wenceslaus and Agnes of Bohemia

The main landmark of Hustopeče is the Church of Saints Wenceslaus and Agnes of Bohemia. The original Church of St. Wenceslaus was built in the early 14th century. Though renovated several times, its steeple collapsed in 1961 and damaged the church's structure greatly. Despite efforts to preserve the valuable remaining part, it was decided to demolish the entire building. The new modern church was built on the site of the old one in 1994 and consecrated to Saints Wenceslaus and Agnes of Bohemia. The new church has a 52-metre (171 ft) high steeple.

The second landmark of the town square is the town hall. This Neo-Renaissance building dates from 1906.

== Notable people ==
- Tomáš Garrigue Masaryk (1850–1937), politician, the first president of Czechoslovakia; lived here in 1861–1868
- Ilse Tielsch (1929–2023), Austrian writer
- Josef Šural (1990–2019), footballer
- Michal Sáček (born 1996), footballer

== Twin towns – sister cities ==
Hustopeče is twinned with:

- Benátky nad Jizerou, Czech Republic
- Miedźna, Poland
- Modra, Slovakia
