= Vísky (Rokycany District) =

- Municipality
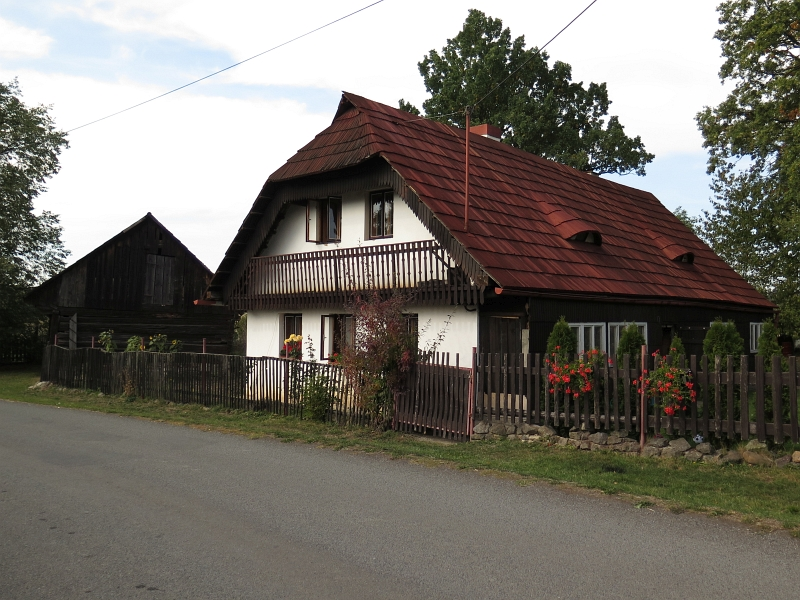
- Homestead No. 27, a cultural monument

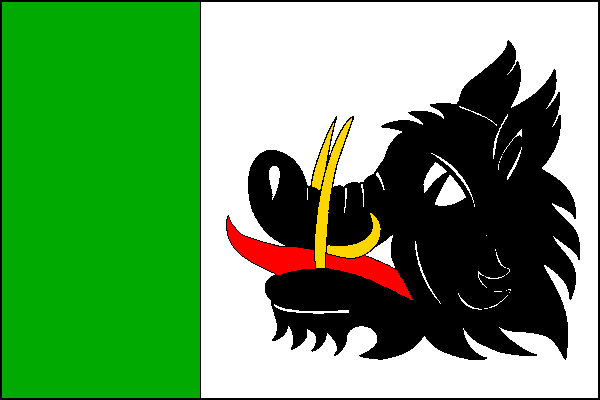
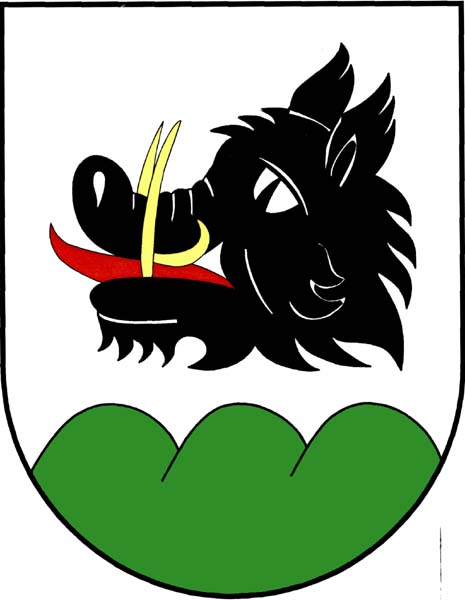
- Flag Coat of arms

- Location in the Czech Republic
- Coordinates: 49°39′5″N 13°40′58″E
- Country: Czech Republic
- Region: Plzeň
- District: Rokycany
- First mentioned: 1368

Area
  - Total: 1.39 km^{2} (0.54 sq mi)
- Elevation: 565 m (1,854 ft)

Population (2026-01-01)
  - Total: 61
  - Density: 44/km^{2} (110/sq mi)
- Time zone: UTC+1 (CET)
  - Summer (DST): UTC+2 (CEST)
- Postal code: 338 43
- Website: www.obec-visky.cz

Vísky is a municipality and village in Rokycany District in the Plzeň Region of the Czech Republic. It has about 60 inhabitants.

Vísky lies approximately 13 kilometres (8 mi) south-east of Rokycany, 25 km (16 mi) south-east of Plzeň, and 73 km (45 mi) south-west of Prague.

== Demographics ==
Historical population
Year	Pop.	±%
1869	286	—
1880	327	+14.3%
1890	275	−15.9%
1900	270	−1.8%
1910	221	−18.1%
1921	199	−10.0%
1930	185	−7.0%
1950	93	−49.7%
1961	101	+8.6%
1970	59	−41.6%
1980	48	−18.6%
1991	31	−35.4%
2001	38	+22.6%
2011	43	+13.2%
2021	66	+53.5%
Source: Censuses
