= Vísky (Blansko District) =

- Municipality
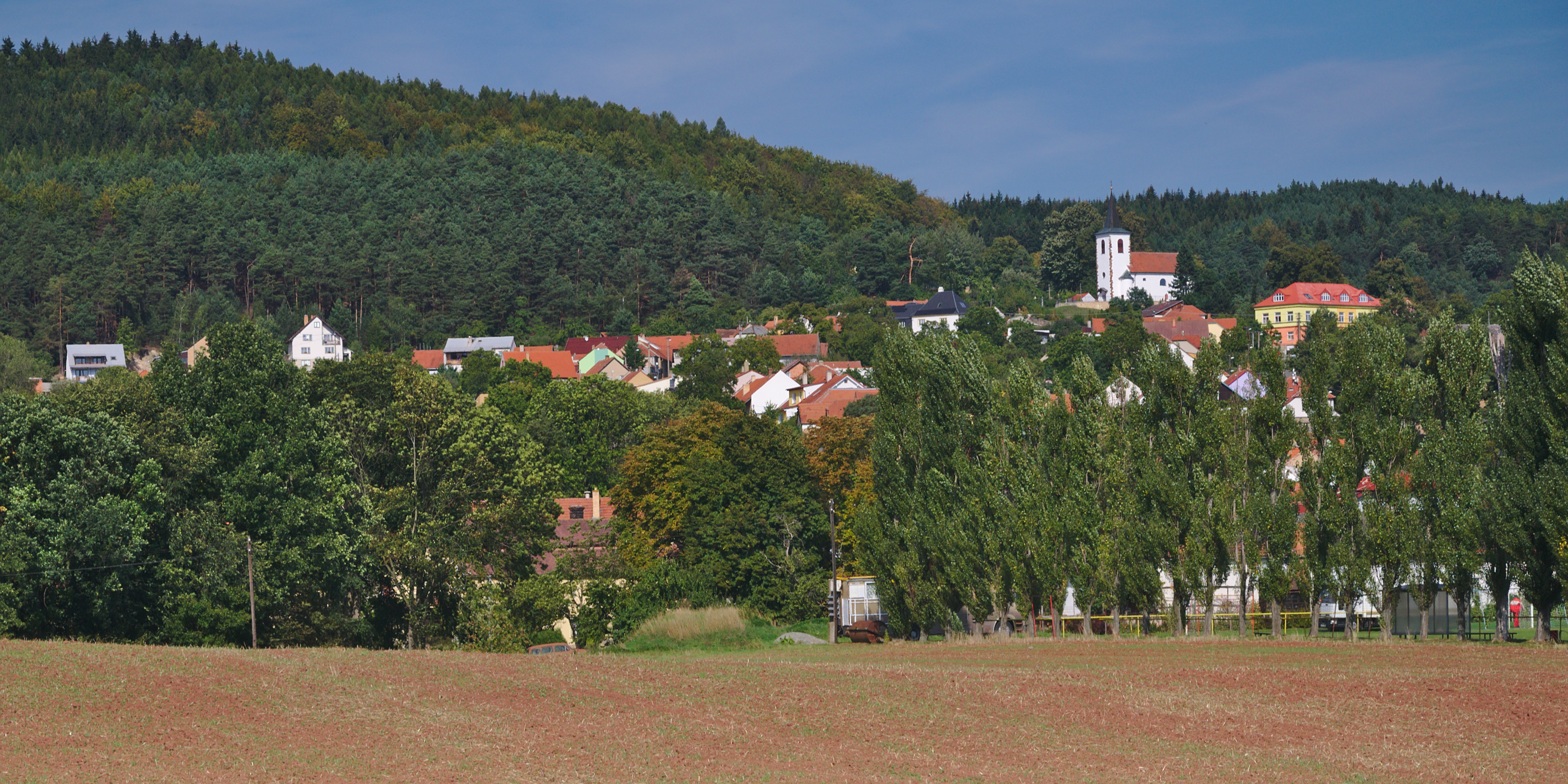
- View from the south

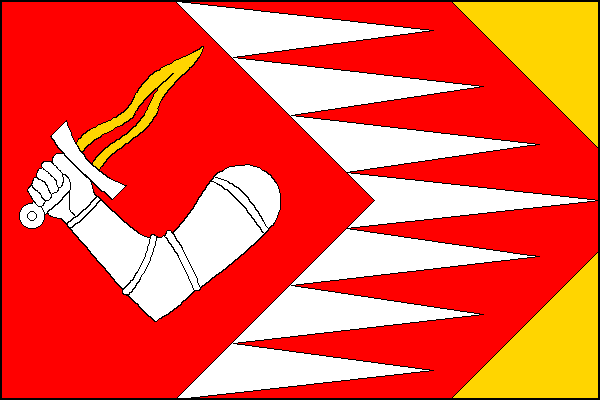
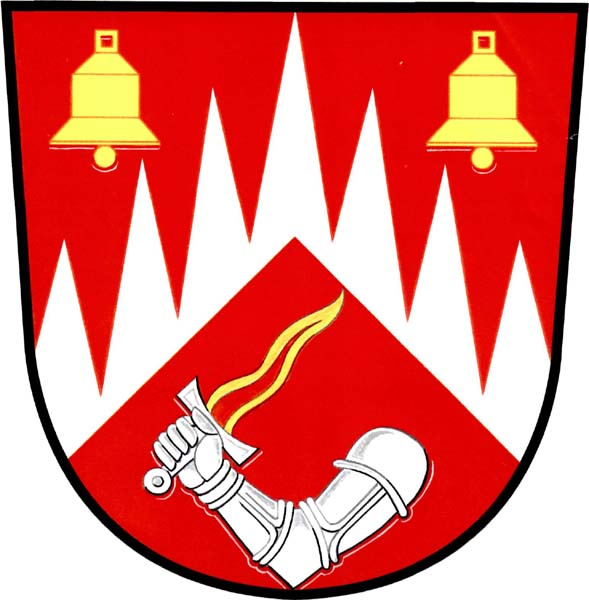
- Flag Coat of arms

- Location in the Czech Republic
- Coordinates: 49°32′18″N 16°37′32″E
- Country: Czech Republic
- Region: South Moravian
- District: Blansko
- First mentioned: 1450

Area
  - Total: 3.79 km^{2} (1.46 sq mi)
- Elevation: 415 m (1,362 ft)

Population (2026-01-01)
  - Total: 253
  - Density: 66.8/km^{2} (173/sq mi)
- Time zone: UTC+1 (CET)
  - Summer (DST): UTC+2 (CEST)
- Postal code: 679 33
- Website: www.visky.cz

Vísky is a municipality and village in Blansko District in the South Moravian Region of the Czech Republic. It has about 300 inhabitants.

Vísky lies approximately 19 kilometres (12 mi) north of Blansko, 38 km (24 mi) north of Brno, and 170 km (110 mi) east of Prague.

== Demographics ==
Historical population
Year	Pop.	±%
1869	226	—
1880	247	+9.3%
1890	276	+11.7%
1900	285	+3.3%
1910	355	+24.6%
1921	356	+0.3%
1930	352	−1.1%
1950	305	−13.4%
1961	294	−3.6%
1970	272	−7.5%
1980	221	−18.8%
1991	230	+4.1%
2001	222	−3.5%
2011	253	+14.0%
2021	262	+3.6%
Source: Censuses
