= County Bärn =

Historic Sudeten county

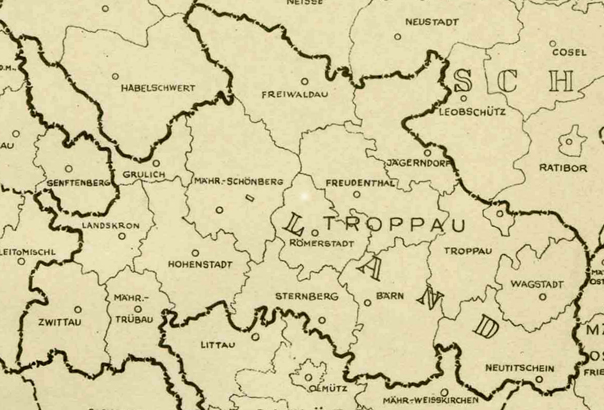
Map of the historic Sudeten counties of Northern Moravia, including that of County Bärn

The Sudeten German county of Bärn during the period between 1938 and 1945. On 1 January 1945 the county included:

- 6 towns
- 52 more communities

The population of the county on 1 December 1930 was 37,158 inhabitants; on 17 May 1939, 37,121 residents; and 22 May 1947, 25,608 inhabitants.

== Literature ==
- Heimatbuch Kreis Bärn, Hrsg. Heimatkreis Bärn e. V. Langgöns, Langgöns/Marburg 2005; 328 Seiten.
- Josef Bartoš et al. Historický místopis Moravy a Slezska v letech 1848-1960. Sv. 3, okresy: Olomouc město a venkov, Litovel, Šternberk, Moravský Beroun. Profil, Ostrava 1972.
