= Víska u Jevíčka =

- Municipality
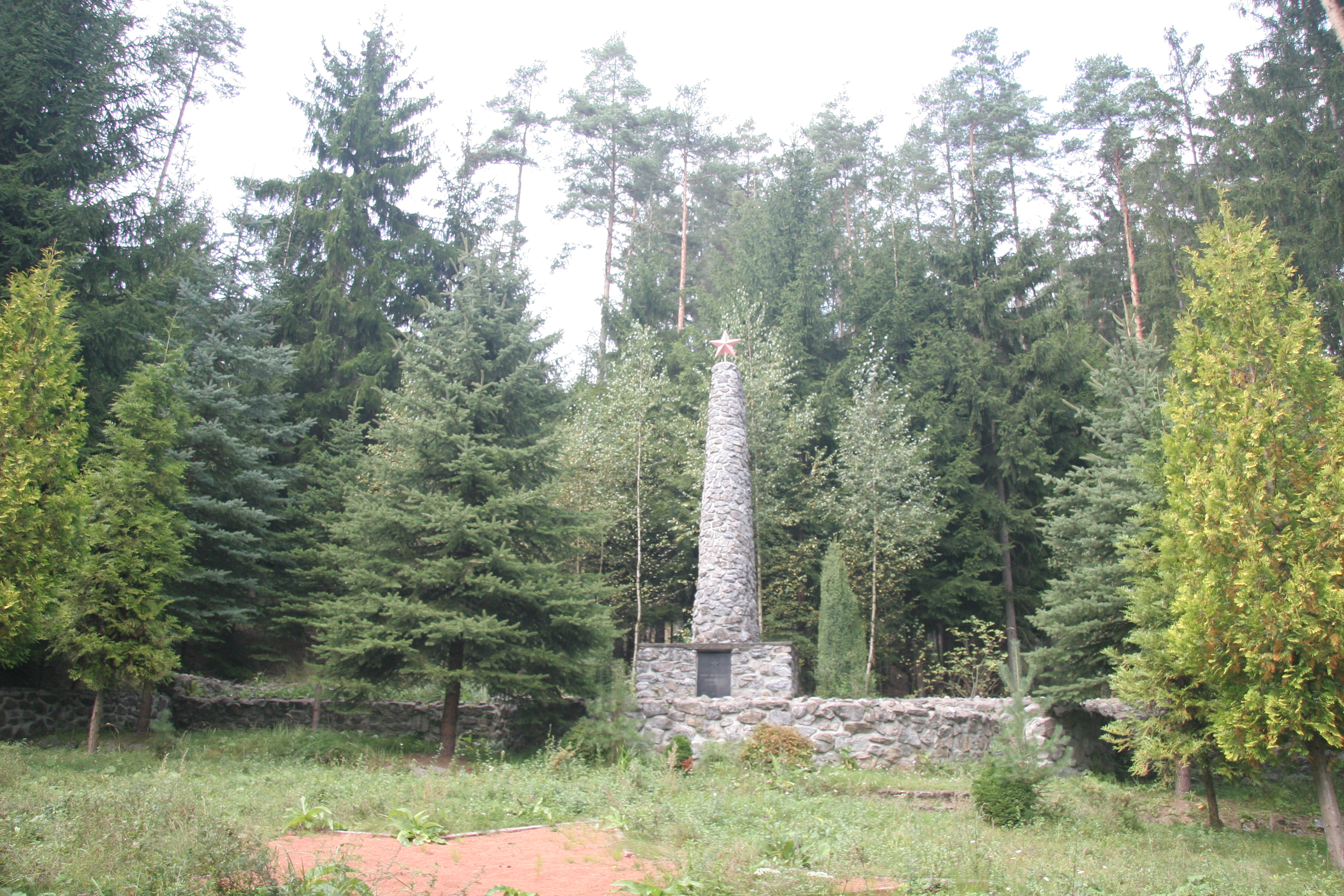
- Monument and forest cemetery of 143 prisoners

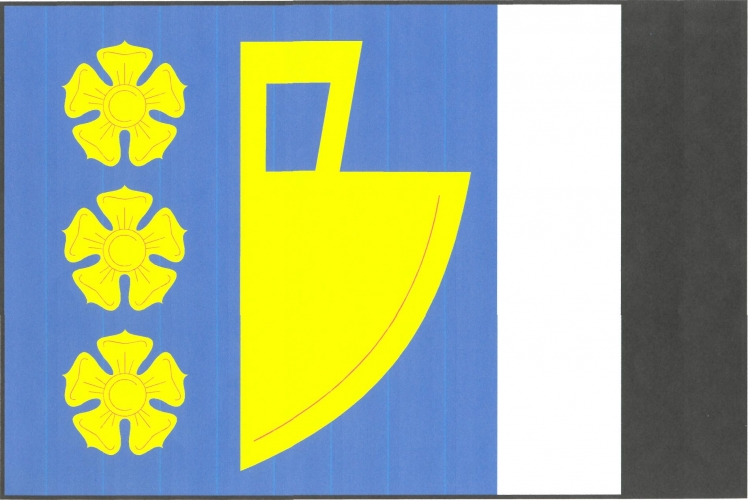
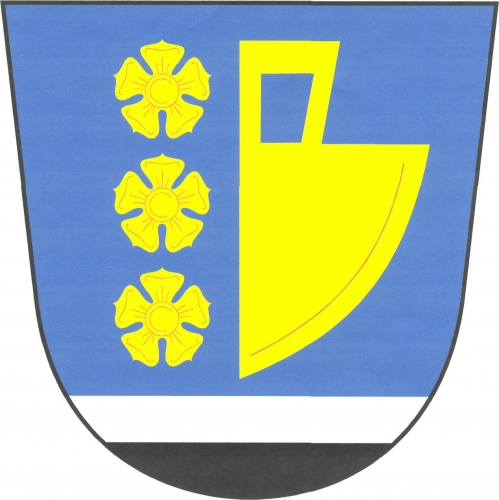
- Flag Coat of arms

- Location in the Czech Republic
- Coordinates: 49°39′9″N 16°42′28″E
- Country: Czech Republic
- Region: Pardubice
- District: Svitavy
- First mentioned: 1258

Area
  - Total: 3.66 km^{2} (1.41 sq mi)
- Elevation: 386 m (1,266 ft)

Population (2026-01-01)
  - Total: 186
  - Density: 50.8/km^{2} (132/sq mi)
- Time zone: UTC+1 (CET)
  - Summer (DST): UTC+2 (CEST)
- Postal code: 569 43
- Website: viskaujevicka.cz

Víska u Jevíčka is a municipality and village in Svitavy District in the Pardubice Region of the Czech Republic. It has about 200 inhabitants.

Víska u Jevíčka lies approximately 22 kilometres (14 mi) south-east of Svitavy, 80 km (50 mi) south-east of Pardubice, and 172 km (107 mi) east of Prague.

== History ==
The first written mention of Víska u Jevíčka is from 1258.

== Demographics ==
Historical population
Year	Pop.	±%
1869	351	—
1880	341	−2.8%
1890	336	−1.5%
1900	369	+9.8%
1910	368	−0.3%
1921	327	−11.1%
1930	336	+2.8%
1950	232	−31.0%
1961	209	−9.9%
1970	190	−9.1%
1980	181	−4.7%
1991	187	+3.3%
2001	159	−15.0%
2011	154	−3.1%
2021	157	+1.9%
Source: Censuses
