= Malá Víska =

- Municipality
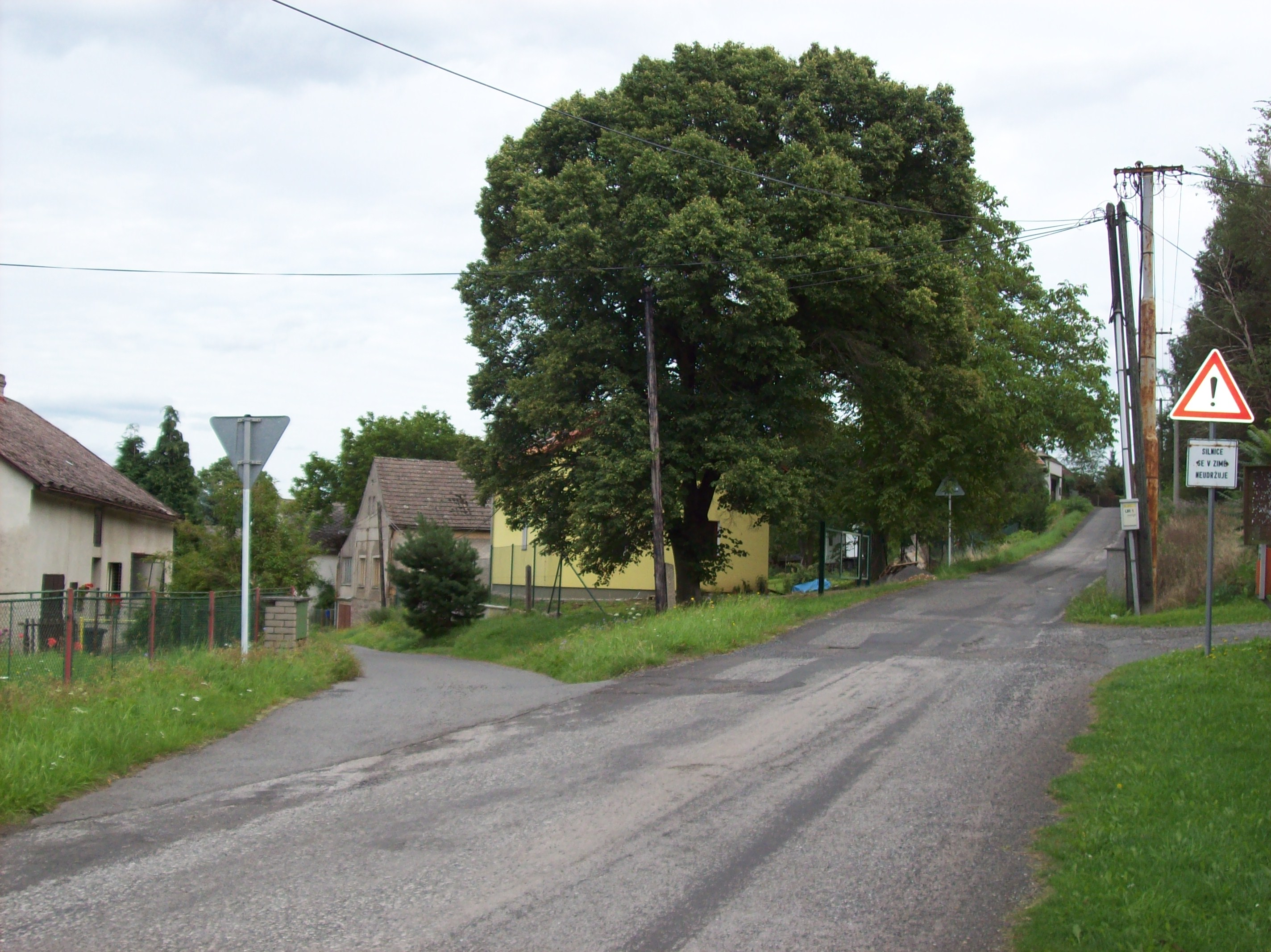
- Lower part of Malá Víska

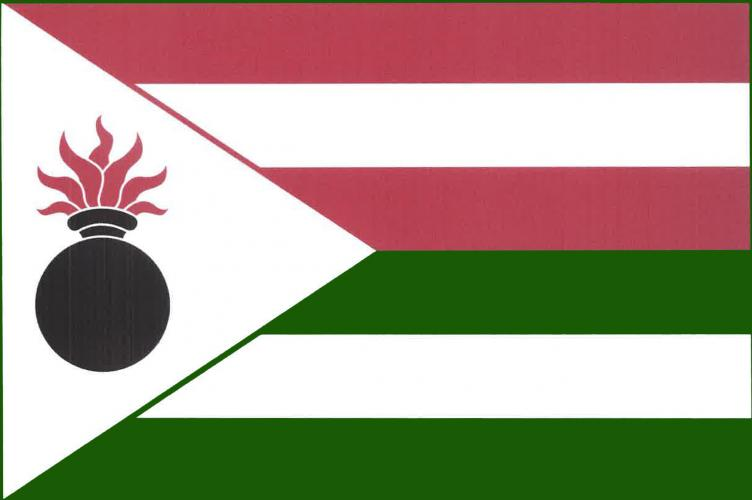
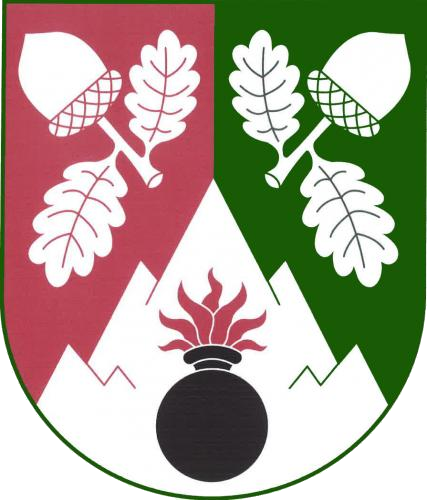
- Flag Coat of arms

- Location in the Czech Republic
- Coordinates: 49°46′34″N 13°52′32″E
- Country: Czech Republic
- Region: Central Bohemian
- District: Beroun
- First mentioned: 1520

Area
  - Total: 10.19 km^{2} (3.93 sq mi)
- Elevation: 550 m (1,800 ft)

Population (2026-01-01)
  - Total: 109
  - Density: 10.7/km^{2} (27.7/sq mi)
- Time zone: UTC+1 (CET)
  - Summer (DST): UTC+2 (CEST)
- Postal code: 267 62
- Website: www.malaviska.cz

Malá Víska is a municipality and village in Beroun District in the Central Bohemian Region of the Czech Republic. It has about 100 inhabitants.

== Etymology ==
The name literally means 'little village' in Czech.

== Geography ==
Malá Víska is located about 24 kilometres (15 mi) southwest of Beroun and 45 km (28 mi) southwest of Prague. It lies in the Brdy Highlands. The highest point is at 822 m (2,697 ft) above sea level. Except for the built-up area, the municipality is located in the Brdy Protected Landscape Area.

== History ==
The first written mention of Malá Víska is from 1520. The village was founded as a settlement of woodworkers, charcoal burners and coal miners.

== Demographics ==
Historical population

Year	Pop.	±%
1869	289	—
1880	290	+0.3%
1890	257	−11.4%
1900	248	−3.5%
1910	264	+6.5%

Year	Pop.	±%
1921	277	+4.9%
1930	228	−17.7%
1950	154	−32.5%
1961	153	−0.6%
1970	149	−2.6%

Year	Pop.	±%
1980	125	−16.1%
1991	93	−25.6%
2001	91	−2.2%
2011	99	+8.8%
2021	103	+4.0%

Source: Censuses

== Transport ==
There are no railways or major roads passing through the municipality.

== Sights ==
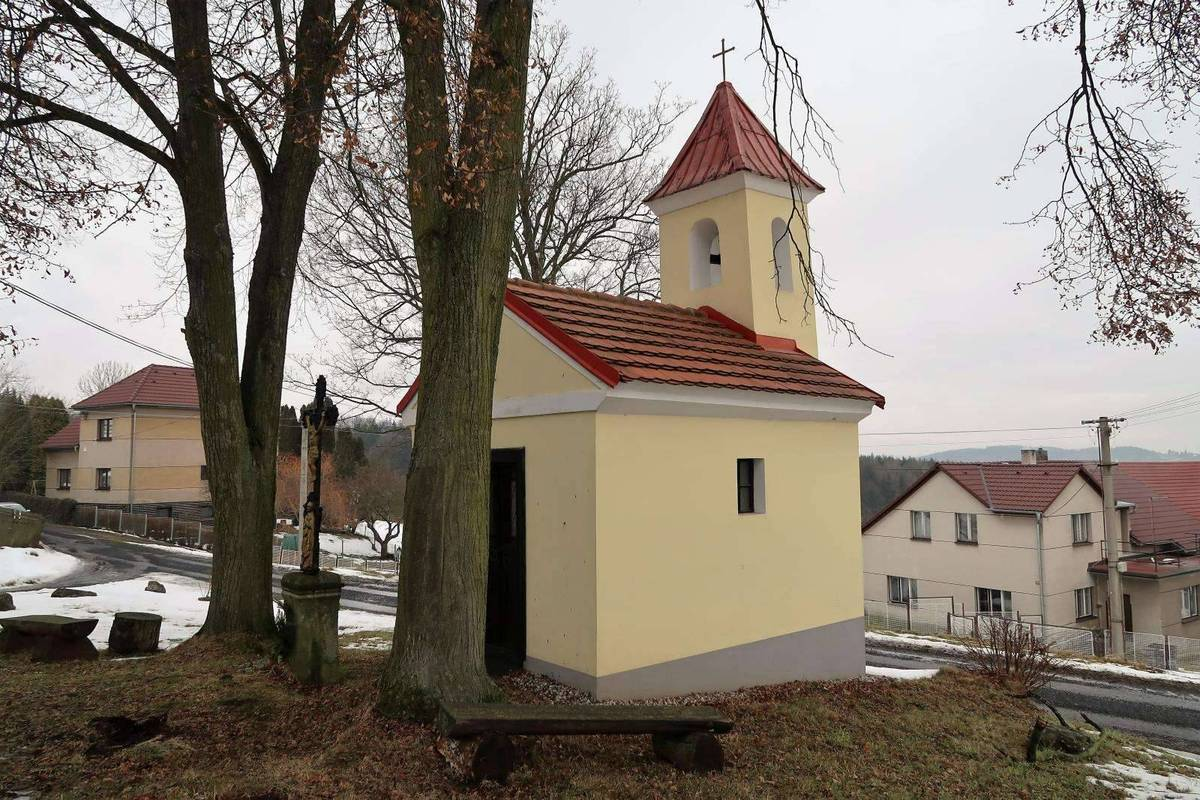
Chapel

The only protected cultural monument in the municipality is a military bunker from the early 1930s called Jordán. It is the most important test object of heavy fortification in the Czech Republic.

A historical landmark in the centre of Malá Víska is a chapel.
