= Čmelíny =

- Municipality
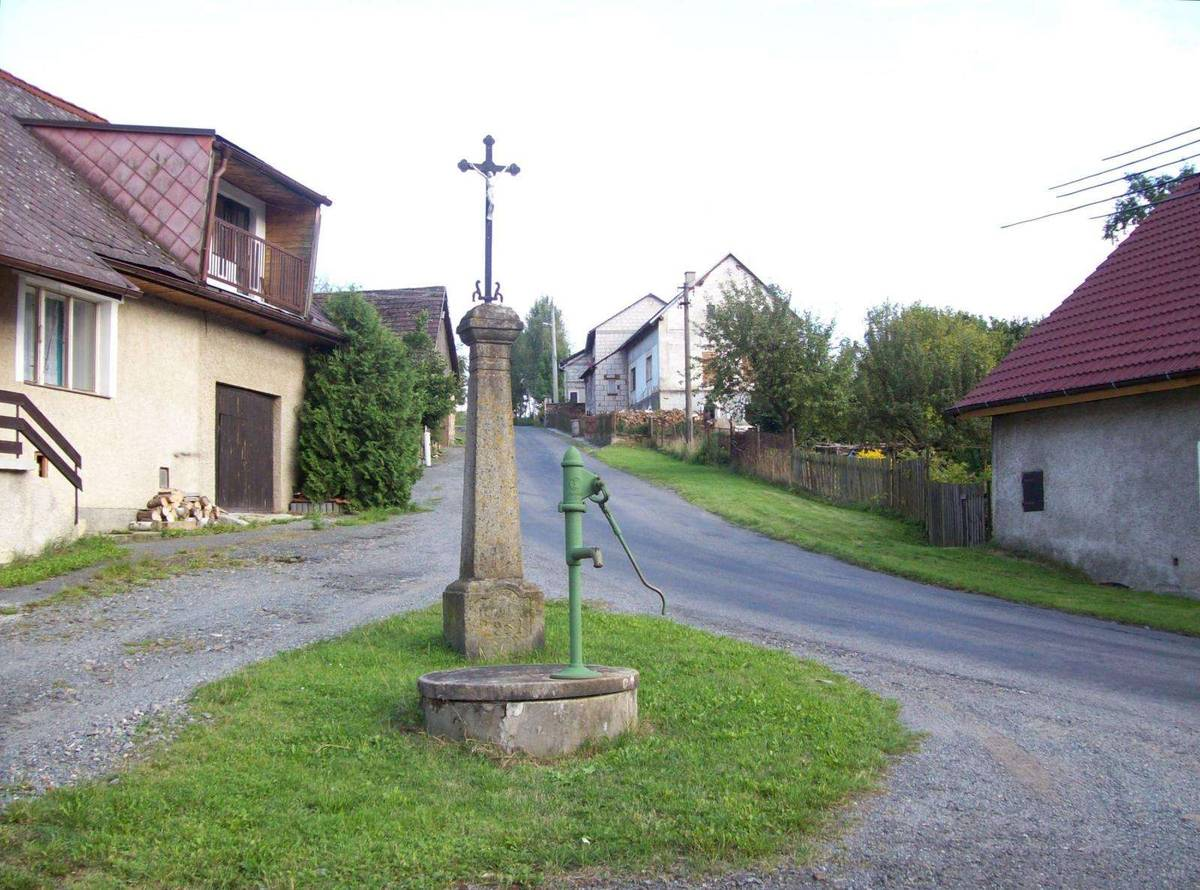
- Víska, a part of Čmelíny

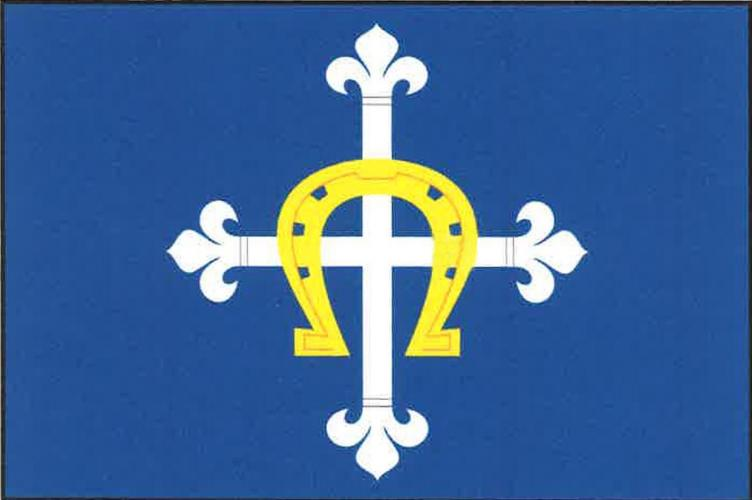
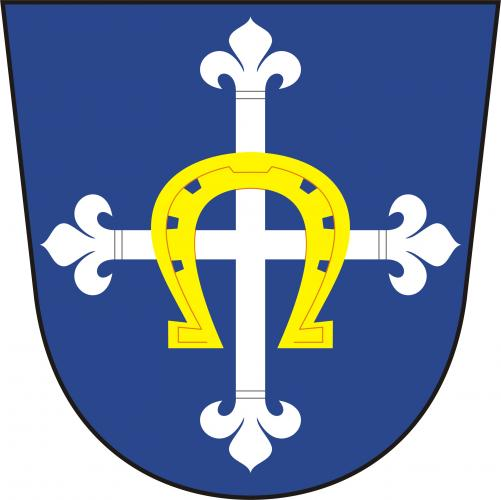
- Flag Coat of arms

- Location in the Czech Republic
- Coordinates: 49°29′20″N 13°39′16″E
- Country: Czech Republic
- Region: Plzeň
- District: Plzeň-South
- First mentioned: 1384

Area
  - Total: 4.65 km^{2} (1.80 sq mi)
- Elevation: 444 m (1,457 ft)

Population (2026-01-01)
  - Total: 128
  - Density: 27.5/km^{2} (71.3/sq mi)
- Time zone: UTC+1 (CET)
  - Summer (DST): UTC+2 (CEST)
- Postal code: 335 01
- Website: www.cmeliny-viska.cz

Čmelíny is a municipality and village in Plzeň-South District in the Plzeň Region of the Czech Republic. It has about 100 inhabitants.

Čmelíny lies approximately 36 kilometres (22 mi) south-east of Plzeň and 87 km (54 mi) south-west of Prague.

== Administrative division ==
Čmelíny consists of two municipal parts (in brackets population according to the 2021 census):

- Čmelíny (64)
- Víska (54)

== Demographics ==
Historical population
Year	Pop.	±%
1869	404	—
1880	368	−8.9%
1890	349	−5.2%
1900	367	+5.2%
1910	321	−12.5%
1921	334	+4.0%
1930	307	−8.1%
1950	205	−33.2%
1961	212	+3.4%
1970	191	−9.9%
1980	158	−17.3%
1991	131	−17.1%
2001	131	+0.0%
2011	108	−17.6%
2021	118	+9.3%
Source: Censuses
