= County Freudenthal =

The German County Freudenthal was in the period between 1938 and 1945. It included on 1 January 1945:

- the four cities Freudenthal, Engelberg, Bennisch and Würbenthal
- 94 additional communities.

County Freudenthal had on 1 December 1930: 49,011 inhabitants, on 17 May 1939: 48,339 inhabitants and on 22 May 1947: 25,998 inhabitants.
