= County Freiwaldau =

The County of Freiwaldau was a primarily German county in the Sudetenland areas of the former Czechoslovkia. It was created in 1938 out of the political district of Freiwaldau, which had existed since 1850. The county was changed on January 1, 1945 to the administrative district of Freiwaldau.

The county of Freiwaldau covered 736.36 km² with 68,823 inhabitants, of which 66,855 were Germans. The population on December 1, 1930: was 71,717 inhabitants, on 17 May 1939: 70,005 inhabitants and on 22 May 1947: 36,302 inhabitants.

The county included:

- The cities of Freiwaldau, Friedeberg, Jauernig, Weidenau and Zuckmantel
- 35 other municipalities.
