= Trnovany =

- Municipality
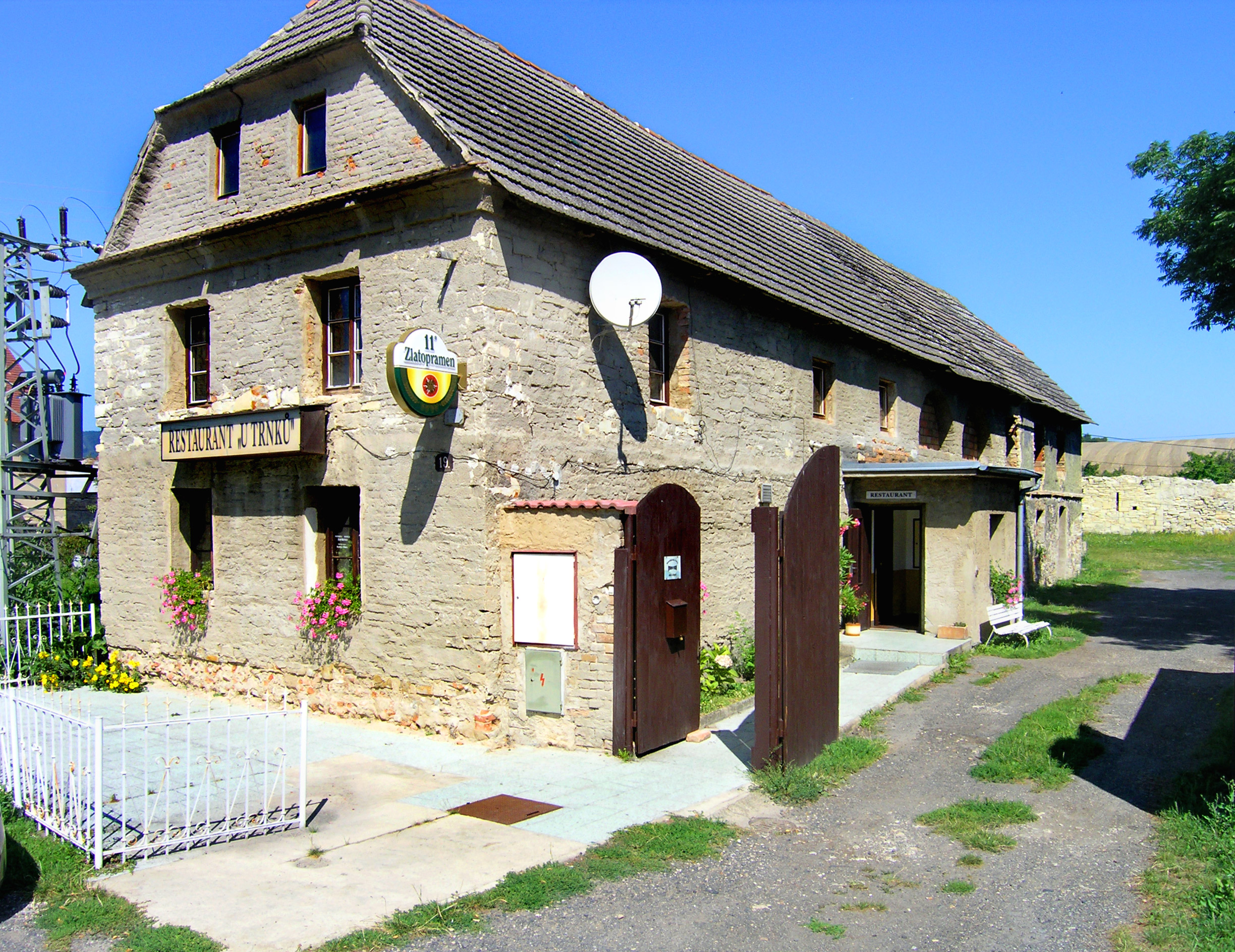
- Restaurant in the centre of Trnovany

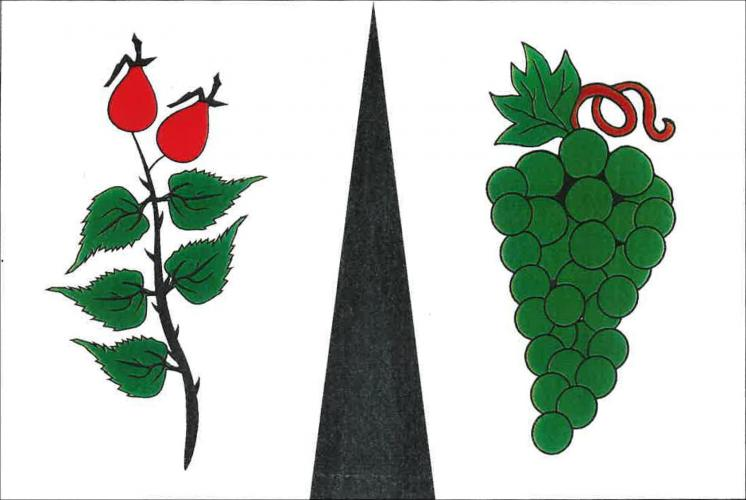
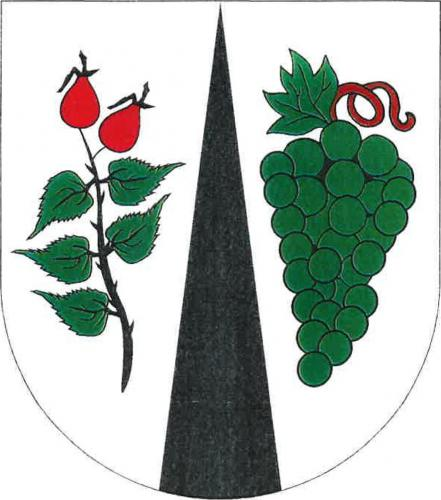
- Flag Coat of arms

- Location in the Czech Republic
- Coordinates: 50°32′36″N 14°40′45″E
- Country: Czech Republic
- Region: Ústí nad Labem
- District: Litoměřice
- First mentioned: 1057

Area
  - Total: 3.04 km^{2} (1.17 sq mi)
- Elevation: 212 m (696 ft)

Population (2026-01-01)
  - Total: 481
  - Density: 158/km^{2} (410/sq mi)
- Time zone: UTC+1 (CET)
  - Summer (DST): UTC+2 (CEST)
- Postal code: 412 01
- Website: www.trnovany.cz

Trnovany is a municipality and village in Litoměřice District in the Ústí nad Labem Region of the Czech Republic. It has about 500 inhabitants.

Trnovany lies approximately 5 kilometres (3 mi) east of Litoměřice, 17 km (11 mi) south-east of Ústí nad Labem, and 54 km (34 mi) north of Prague.

== Administrative division ==
Trnovany consists of two municipal parts (in brackets population according to the 2021 census):

- Trnovany (116)
- Podviní (300)

== Demographics ==
Historical population
Year	Pop.	±%
1869	364	—
1880	354	−2.7%
1890	355	+0.3%
1900	438	+23.4%
1910	446	+1.8%
1921	414	−7.2%
1930	475	+14.7%
1950	266	−44.0%
1961	258	−3.0%
1970	248	−3.9%
1980	274	+10.5%
1991	270	−1.5%
2001	289	+7.0%
2011	340	+17.6%
2021	416	+22.4%
Source: Censuses
