= Horní Město =

- Municipality
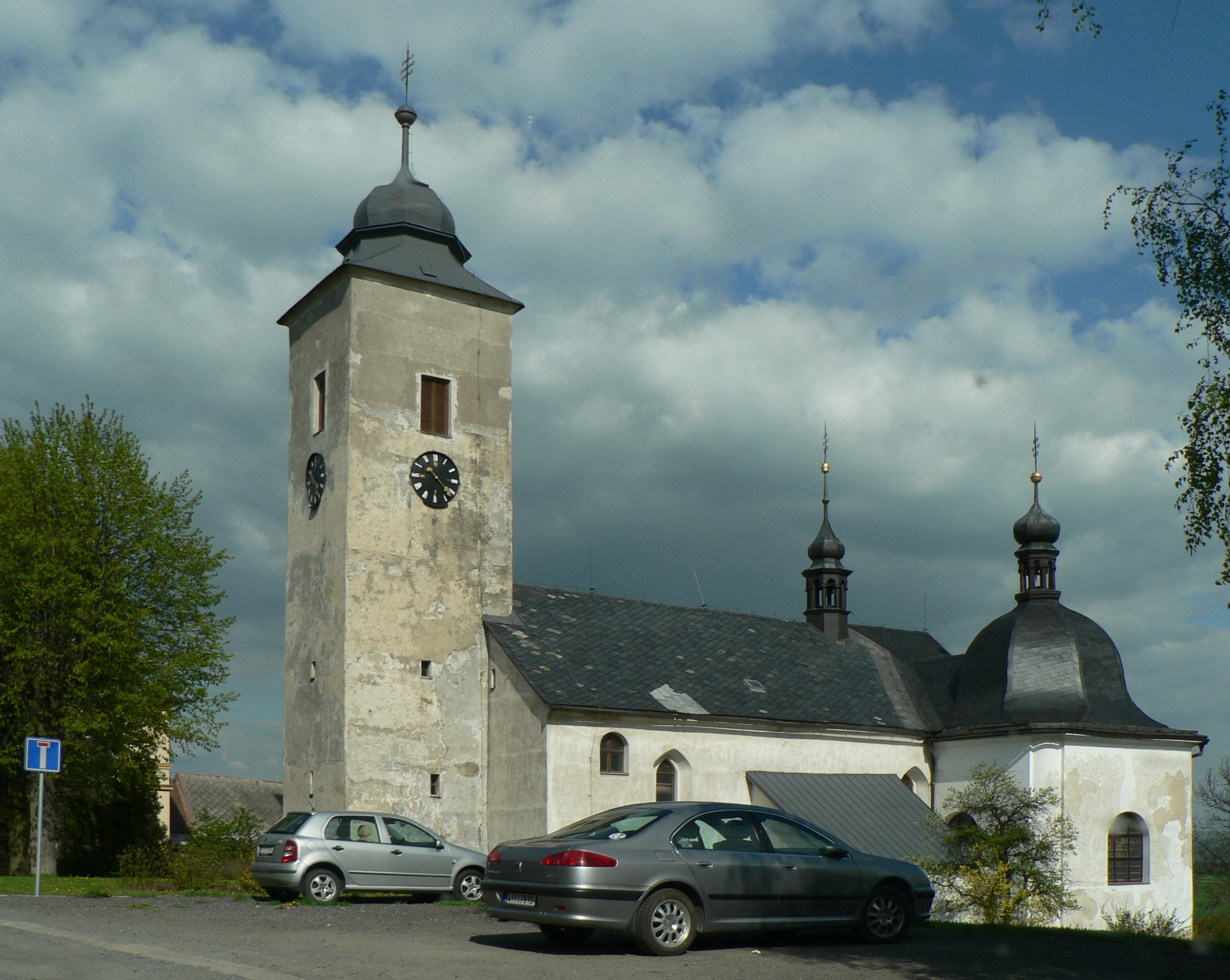
- Church of Saint Mary Magdalene

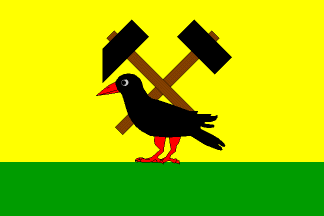
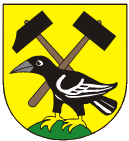
- Flag Coat of arms

- Location in the Czech Republic
- Coordinates: 49°54′30″N 17°12′40″E
- Country: Czech Republic
- Region: Moravian-Silesian
- District: Bruntál
- First mentioned: 1351

Area
  - Total: 31.63 km^{2} (12.21 sq mi)
- Elevation: 675 m (2,215 ft)

Population (2026-01-01)
  - Total: 825
  - Density: 26.1/km^{2} (67.6/sq mi)
- Time zone: UTC+1 (CET)
  - Summer (DST): UTC+2 (CEST)
- Postal code: 793 44
- Website: www.hornimesto.cz

Horní Město (German: Bergstadt) is a municipality and village in Bruntál District in the Moravian-Silesian Region of the Czech Republic. It has about 800 inhabitants.

== Administrative division ==
Horní Město consists of five municipal parts (in brackets population according to the 2021 census):

- Horní Město (547)
- Dobřečov (44)
- Rešov (37)
- Skály (101)
- Stříbrné Hory (51)

== Etymology ==
The original German name Bergstadt means 'mountain town'. The Czech name was derived from the German name and literally means 'mining town'.

== Geography ==
Horní Město is located about 20 kilometres (12 mi) southwest of Bruntál and 34 km (21 mi) north of Olomouc. It lies on the border between the Nízký Jeseník and Hrubý Jeseník mountain ranges. The highest point is the mountain Dobřečovská hora at 809 m (2,654 ft) above sea level. The Huntava Stream flows through the municipality.

== History ==
The first written mention of Horní Město is from 1398, when a settlement called Hankštejn/Hangstein was located here. Silver mining in the area was first documented in 1402, later gold and non-ferrous metals were also mined. In 1580, a free imperial town was founded by Emperor Rudolf II and was named Bergstadt – Hangstein. Later the second part of the name was dropped.

From 1938 to 1945, it was annexed by Nazi Germany and administered as a part of the Reichsgau Sudetenland. After the war, the German-speaking population was expelled.

In the middle of the 20th century, the last gold was mined and only non-ferrous metals remained. Their mining ended in 1970.

== Demographics ==
Historical population

Year	Pop.	±%
1869	3,904	—
1880	3,496	−10.5%
1890	3,189	−8.8%
1900	3,061	−4.0%
1910	3,093	+1.0%

Year	Pop.	±%
1921	2,733	−11.6%
1930	2,914	+6.6%
1950	1,411	−51.6%
1961	1,445	+2.4%
1970	1,302	−9.9%

Year	Pop.	±%
1980	1,219	−6.4%
1991	970	−20.4%
2001	1,013	+4.4%
2011	920	−9.2%
2021	780	−15.2%

Source: Censuses

== Transport ==
There are no railways or major roads passing through the municipality.

== Sights ==
The main landmark of Horní Město is the Church of Saint Mary Magdalene. It was built in 1611. It is decorated by valuable paintings from 1690.
