= Kravaře (Česká Lípa District) =

- Municipality
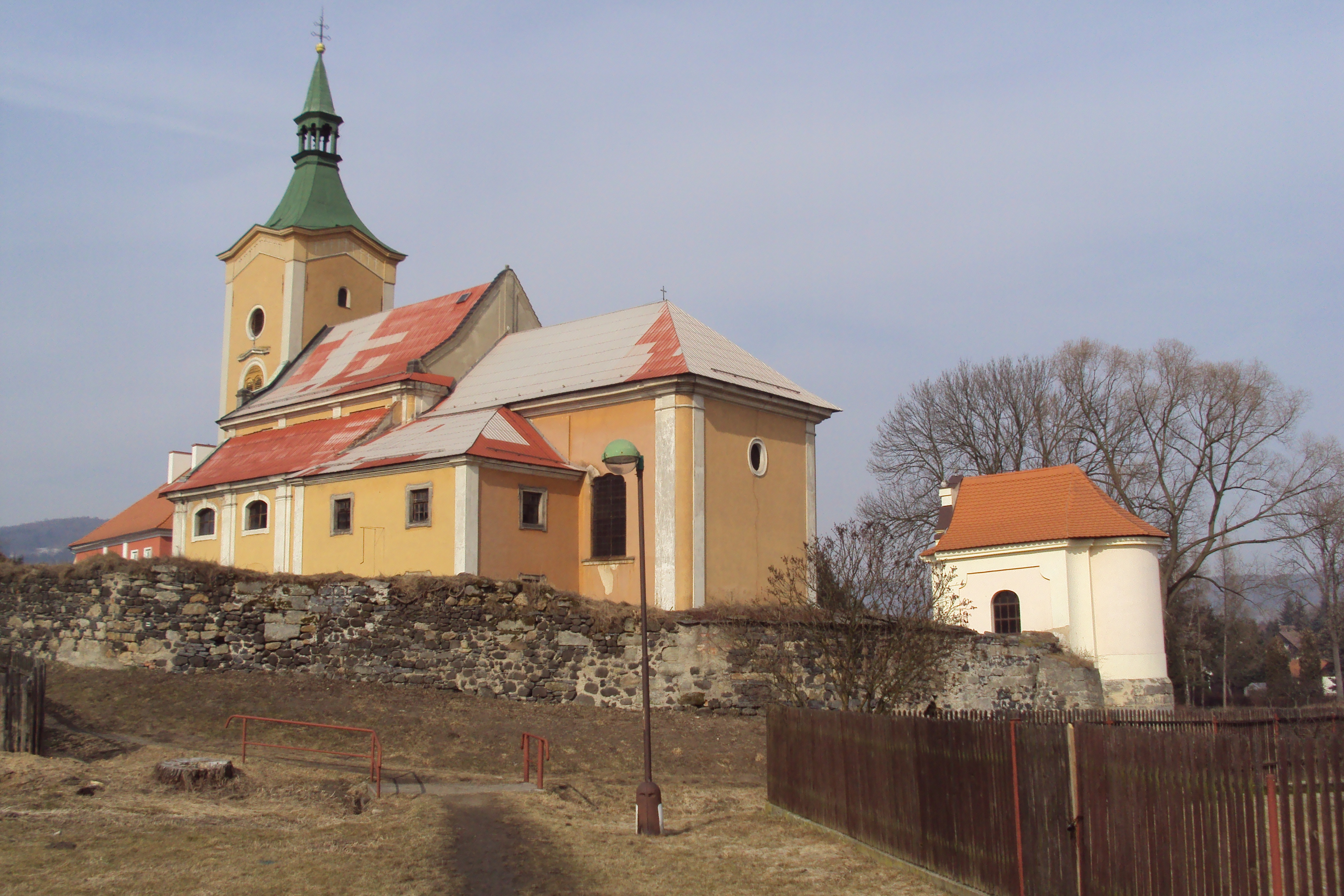
- Church of the Nativity of the Virgin Mary

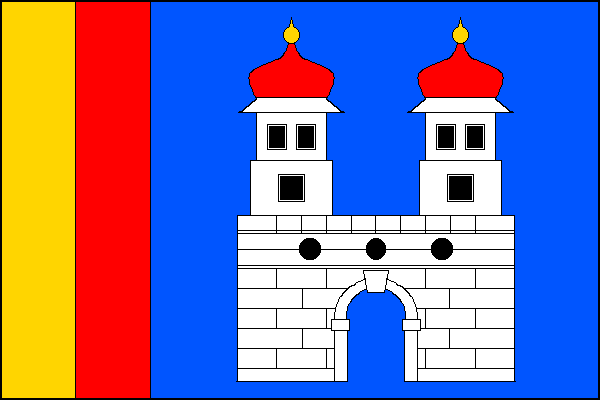
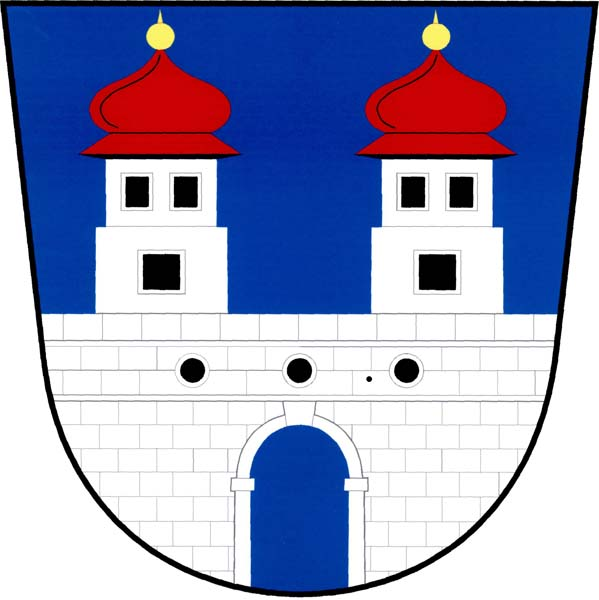
- Flag Coat of arms

- Location in the Czech Republic
- Coordinates: 50°37′57″N 14°23′33″E
- Country: Czech Republic
- Region: Liberec
- District: Česká Lípa
- First mentioned: 1175

Area
  - Total: 15.75 km^{2} (6.08 sq mi)
- Elevation: 280 m (920 ft)

Population (2026-01-01)
  - Total: 770
  - Density: 49/km^{2} (130/sq mi)
- Time zone: UTC+1 (CET)
  - Summer (DST): UTC+2 (CEST)
- Postal code: 471 03
- Website: www.kravarecl.cz

Kravaře (German: Graber) is a municipality and village in Česká Lípa District in the Liberec Region of the Czech Republic. It has about 800 inhabitants. There are three well preserved areas, protected as two village monument reservations (the villages of Janovice and Rané) and one village monument zone (the village of Kravaře).

== Administrative division ==
Kravaře consists of six municipal parts (in brackets population according to the 2021 census):

- Kravaře (522)
- Janovice (110)
- Rané (39)
- Sezímky (28)
- Veliká (36)
- Víska (32)

== Demographics ==
Historical population
Year	Pop.	±%
1869	1,706	—
1880	1,661	−2.6%
1890	1,498	−9.8%
1900	1,505	+0.5%
1910	1,445	−4.0%
1921	1,422	−1.6%
1930	1,556	+9.4%
1950	911	−41.5%
1961	847	−7.0%
1970	765	−9.7%
1980	696	−9.0%
1991	661	−5.0%
2001	726	+9.8%
2011	775	+6.7%
2021	767	−1.0%
Source: Censuses
