= Rittersgrün =

Village in Saxony, Germany

- Village
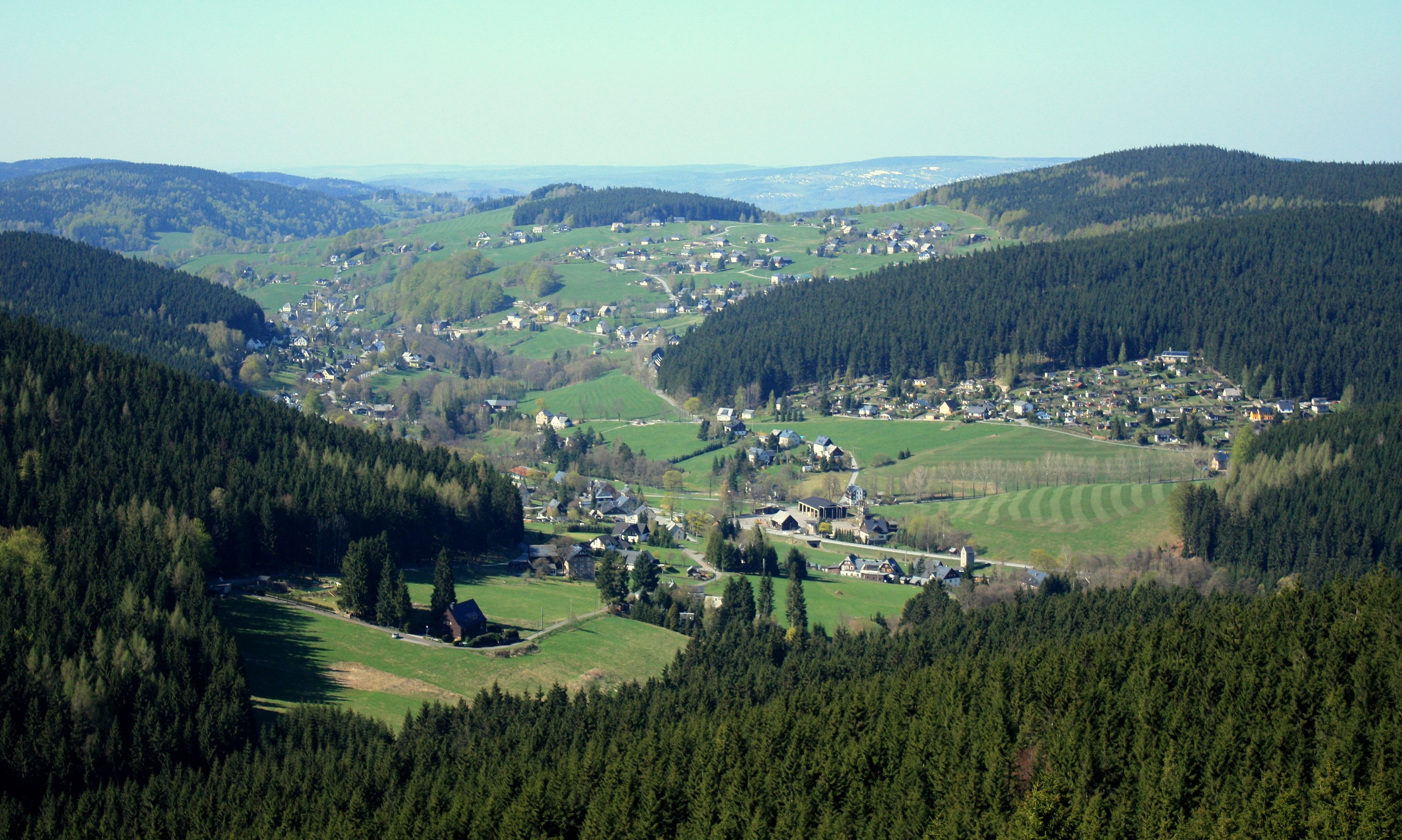
- Rittersgrün seen from the Taubenfels

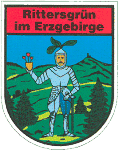
- Coat of arms
- Interactive map of Rittersgrün
- Coordinates: 50°28′24″N 12°48′3″E
- Country: Germany
- State: Saxony
- Municipality: Breitenbrunn

Area
  - Total: 8.45 sq mi (21.88 km^{2})

Population
  - Total: 1,610 (2,011−05−09)
- Postal code: 08359

Rittersgrün is a district of the municipality of Breitenbrunn/Erzgeb in the Erzgebirgskreis in Saxony, Germany. The scattered settlement with around 1600 inhabitants grew up around several hammer mills, which operated on the course of the Pöhlwasser from the 15th to the 19th century and were supplied with ore from numerous surrounding mines. Due to its location on an important Ore Mountain pass, the settlement was repeatedly plundered by passing mercenaries during the Thirty Years' War. After the decline of the hammer mill industry in the middle of the 19th century, the village's economy was dominated by cardboard and sawmills. In 2007, Rittersgrün was incorporated into Breitenbrunn/Erzgeb. Today, Rittersgrün is primarily known as an excursion and winter sports resort. The main attractions include the Saxon Narrow Gauge Railway Museum and a well-developed network of hiking trails.

== Geography ==
=== Geographical location ===
Rittersgrün stretches from northwest to southeast in the Pöhlwasser valley, around seven kilometers south of the large district town of Schwarzenberg, at an altitude of up to 820 meters. Situated on the Rittersgrüner Pass, which has been actively used since the 16th century, the settlement is flanked to the west by the 792-metre-high Hirtenberg and the Kohlung to the south, and to the east by the 700-metre-high Sonnenberg and the 836-metre-high Ochsenkopf. State road 271 runs through the village from Raschau to Oberwiesenthal, into which a connecting road from Breitenbrunn, around 2.5 kilometers away, joins in the village. The border to the Czech Republic runs to the south of the village, over which there are border crossings for skiers, pedestrians and cyclists.

=== Settlement form ===
Rittersgrün is not one of the woodland villages typical of the Ore Mountains, as the rocky subsoil hardly allowed for agriculture. The starting point for the settlement of the valley section was the hammer mills located on the Pöhlwasser. While the houses on the left side of the river are mostly grouped along the S 271, the scattered settlement on the Hammerberg above the former Rothenhammer forms the settlement core on the opposite side.

=== Community structure ===
The political municipality of Rittersgrün was only created in 1856 through the merger of the municipalities of Oberrittersgrün, Unterrittersgrün and Rothenhammer Rittersgrün in the Schwarzenberg court office. The Ehrenzipfel group of houses, which probably originated in the 17th century, has always belonged to Rittersgrün. In 1921, the previously independent estate district of Arnoldshammer became part of Rittersgrün. Oberglobenstein had already been incorporated in the middle of the 19th century, and in 1978 the whole of Globenstein became part of Rittersgrün. This was followed in 1994 by Tellerhäuser with the district of Zweiback. Today, only Rittersgrün and Tellerhäuser are designated as districts of Breitenbrunn under municipal law.

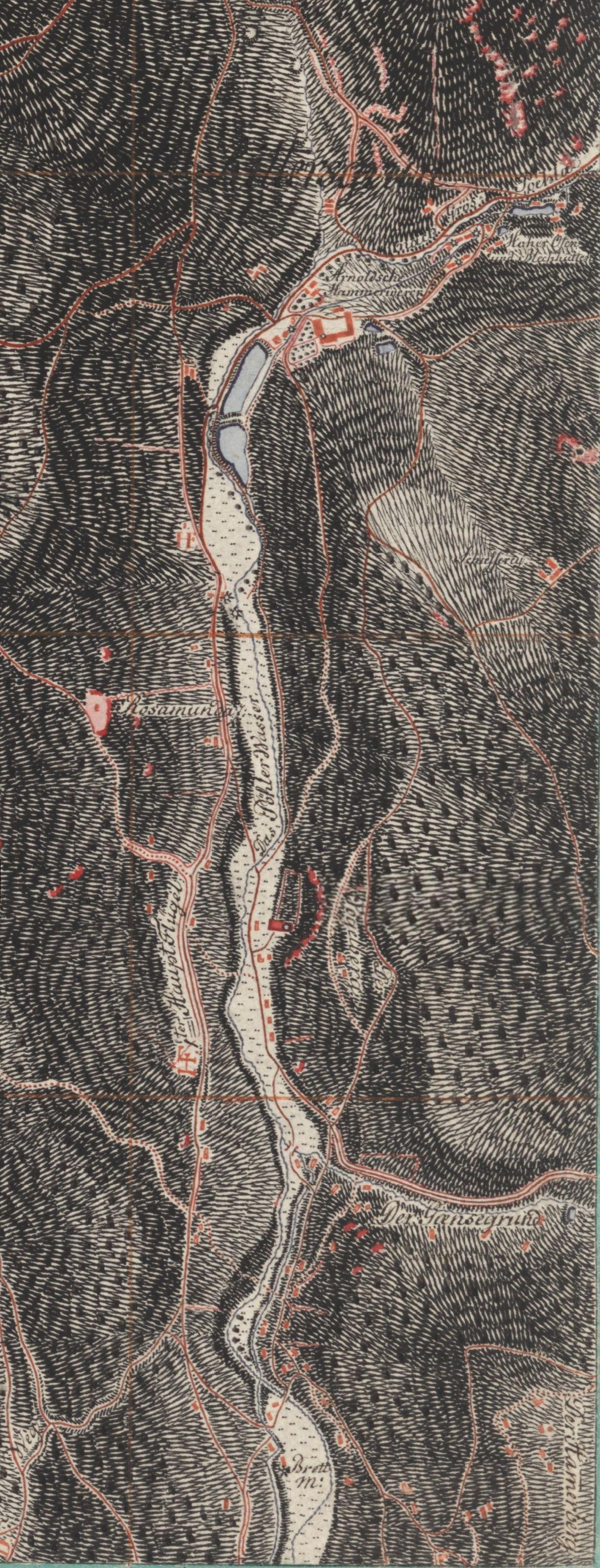
Rittersgrün 1791: Scattered settlement along the Pöhlwasser

=== Geology ===
Rittersgrün is located in the southwest of the Paleozoic Ore Mountains, a few kilometers from the highest peak in Saxony, the Fichtelberg. The ore deposits around Rittersgrün formed the basis for the mining development of the municipality. Magnetite skarns with tin content and non-ferrous magnetite skarns in andalusite-bearing muscovite schists were mined in the pits near Ober- and Niederglobenstein. Magnetic iron ore, zinc blende and limestone were mined in a wooded area of the Hirtenberg. The slope of the Hirtenberg is covered with wooded and meadow-covered weathered soils of light-colored mica schist. In the Rothen-Adler-Stollen in the south-eastern area of the settlement known as Hammerberg above the Rothenhammer, red ironstone was mined from the original magnetic ironstone; pyroxene, calcite, fluorspar and brown spar were also found. Massive mica schist rocks form the summit of the Ochsenkopf. The Sonnenberg was built on a non-ferrous metal skarn with magnetite and tin content. The ore minerals included zinc blende, chalcopyrite, magnetic pyrites and magnetic iron ore.

=== Climate ===
Due to its altitude, the temperatures in Rittersgrün are below those of the lower-lying municipalities in the surrounding area all year round. In the winter months, the higher areas of Rittersgrün are often covered in snow for long periods. The average annual precipitation of 1024.4 mm is roughly on a par with Oberwiesenthal (1058.7 mm), significantly higher than in the neighboring town of Schwarzenberg (871.3 mm) and considerably higher than in the major Saxon cities of Dresden (583.7 mm) and Leipzig (584.6 mm). Due to the dry air in the area surrounded by dense forest, Rittersgrün was a high-altitude climatic health resort in the first half of the 20th century. The flood of the century in August 2002, when the Pöhlwasser overflowed its banks in many places, caused considerable damage. Rittersgrün is listed by the Saxon State Office for the Environment, Agriculture and Geology as part of a black water flooding area characterized by low water infiltration, low water retention, high terrain gradients, heavy rainfall and snowmelt. Several trees were uprooted and vehicles damaged in a tornado that passed through the Pöhlwasser valley from Rittersgrün to Pöhla on August 13, 2003. Another tornado at the end of July 2005 caused considerable breakage damage in a forest area near Tellerhäuser, which resulted in the clearing of the affected area.

== History ==
=== Hammer mills as the basis for settlement ===
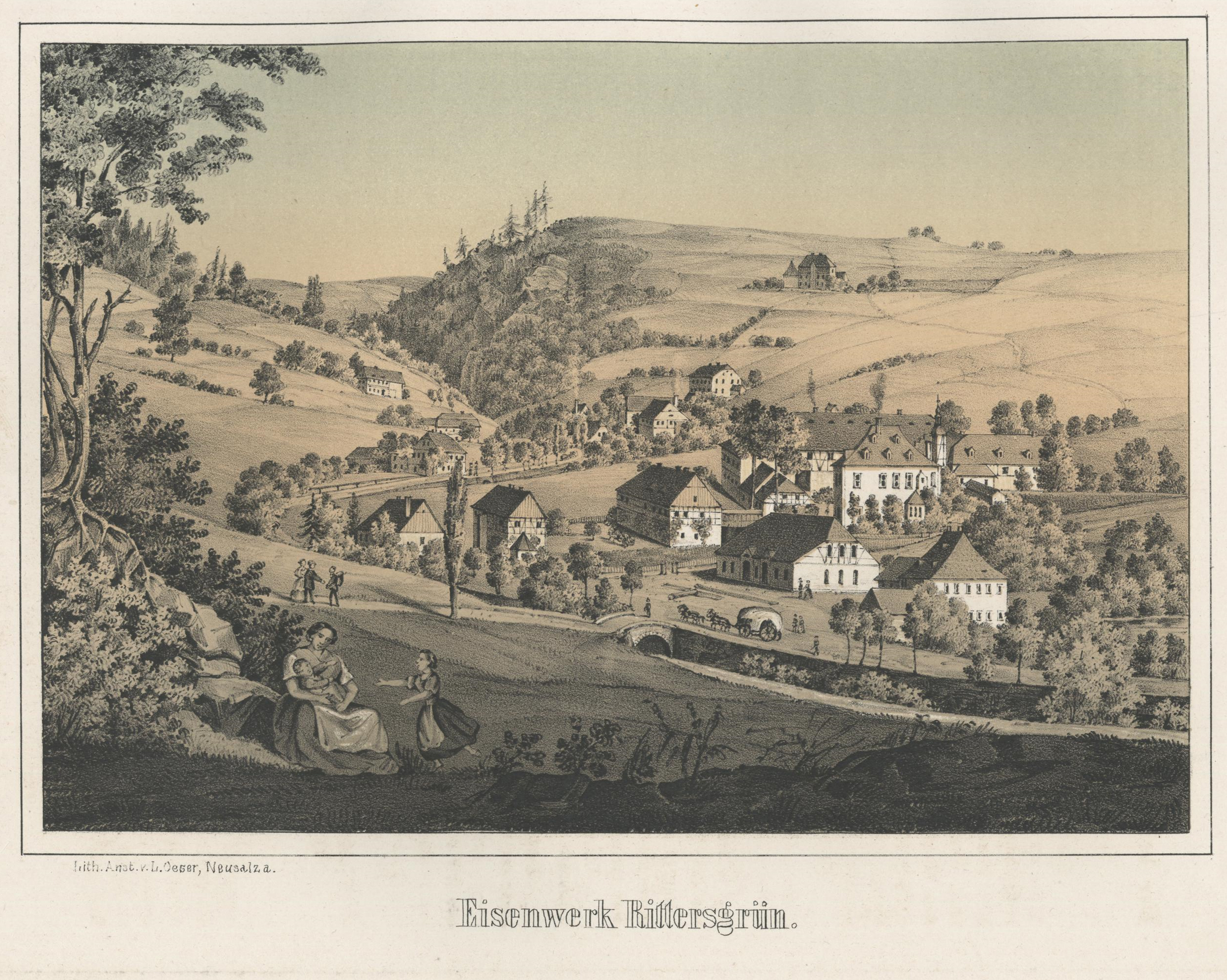
Arnoldshammer around 1850, contemporary engraving

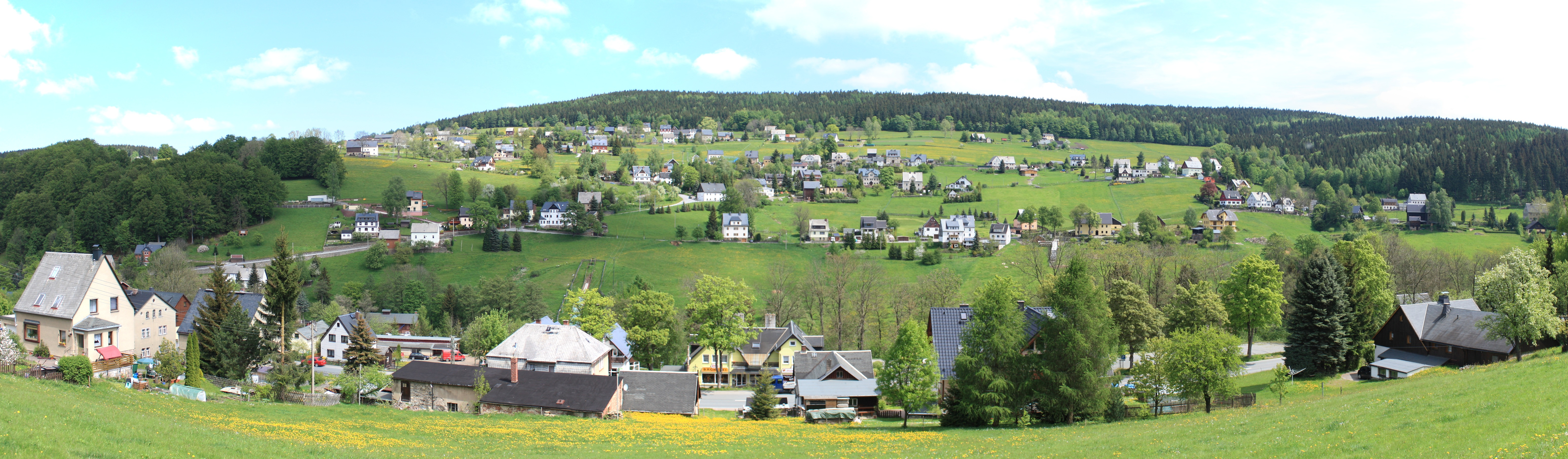
View of the Hammerberg

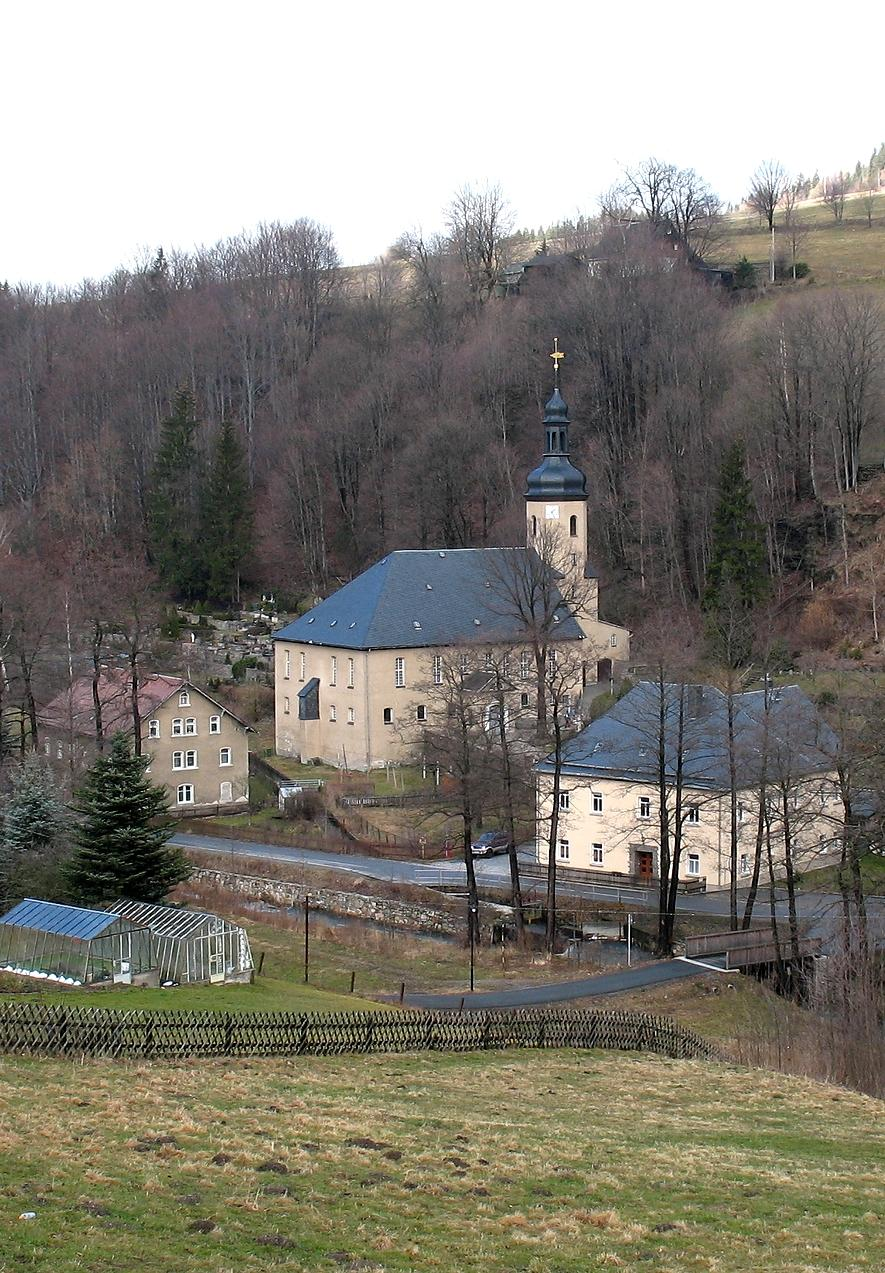
Church and vicarage: conversion from the Escher hammer mill

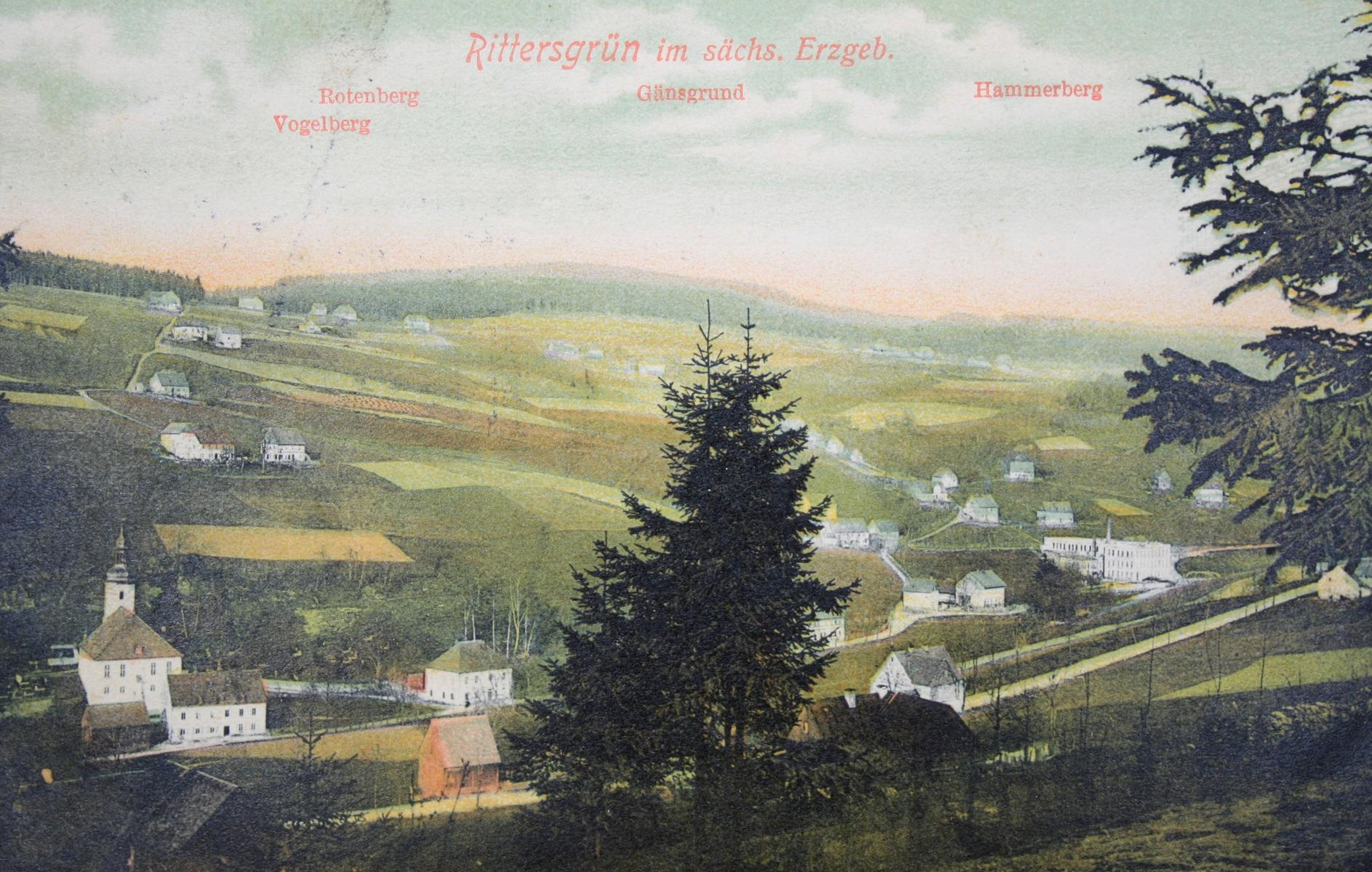
Rittersgrün with church and factory building of Junghans Söhne (1906)

In the Middle Ages, the Pöhlwasser formed the border between the Schwarzenberg dominion and the estates of the Lords of Schönburg to the east. Along the stream was the Rittersgrüner Pass, which crossed the Ore Mountains ridge and, for chroniclers, was an indication of early settlement in the area. The 750th anniversary of Rittersgrün was celebrated in 2000. It is doubtful that a settlement actually existed in the area of today's municipality as early as the 13th century and cannot be proven. The first settlement of the later Rittersgrün is probably closely linked to the construction of a hammer mill on the Pöhlwasser in the 15th century. In 1748, Johann Paul Oettel reported that "Jacob Kleinhempels, who without fault in 1440, worked on the hammer mill at Rittersgrün". It is not known whether this hammer mill and the associated buildings already had a name. It was not until 1534 that Rittersgrün was mentioned in a tax list of the Schwarzenberg office as the name of the first house on the left side of the Pöhlwasser. Where the name Rittersgrün came from and whether it was possibly used for the right-hand side of the stream cannot be determined due to the poor source situation. A few years later, two new hammer mills were built on the right bank of the Pöhlwasser. Hans Schwarz, the mayor of Annaberg, had a "new hammer, on the Behlwasser with a Renwergk" built on the site of today's church. The statement "Undt seint daruber drey wüste Hammerstede und darunter auch eine" suggests that a lively iron processing operation was already underway beforehand. Hans Kleinhempel's hammer was built a little further downstream, presumably on the site of Jakob Kleinhempel's hammer mill mentioned by Oettel. Named Arnoldshammer after a later owner, it remained an independent estate district until the 20th century. At the end of the 16th century, the hammer master Nikolaus Klinger moved a blast furnace to Rittersgrün and thus formed the basis of another hammer mill, which was named the Schmertzingischer Hammer after his son-in-law and successor Rudolph von Schmertzing.

It can be assumed that the first settlers came to Rittersgrün to work in the hammers and settled in their vicinity. An earlier settlement in the area is unlikely, as the harsh climate and rocky subsoil hardly allowed for agriculture and therefore offered neither a livelihood nor an attraction. While little is known about the early history of the right bank of the Pöhlwasser, the settlement on the opposite side of the river is better documented. The first settler to settle on the area to the left of the Pöhlwasser, which is still referred to today as the Amtsseite in allusion to its affiliation to the former Amt Schwarzenberg, was Nisius Lebe from Breitenbrunn, who built his house there in 1534. In 1536, a tax list states "Rittersgrun is a Heuslen". By 1560, eleven houses had already been built and a small settlement had developed.

=== Peak of iron processing in the 17th century ===
At the beginning of the 17th century, iron processing in Rittersgrün had reached its peak. An Öder sheet from around 1610 mentions the following facilities downstream: "Nicol Klingers Erben Zehnhammer" above the confluence of the Mückenbach and Pöhlwasser rivers, "der Klingerische Erben hohe ofen" on the site of the later Schmertzing'schen Hammer, "Paul Eschers hohe ofen" on the site of the later Junghans und Söhne factory, "Paul Eschers Hammer" on the site of today's church and, as the presumed first settlement nucleus, "Caspar Arnolts Hammer". In 1617, Escher's hammer was severely damaged by water and fire and destroyed in 1633 by the imperial troops of General Heinrich von Holk, who used the Rittersgrün Pass as a route from Bohemia to Saxony and back, as were all the iron processing plants in Rittersgrün. While the hammer mills of Arnold and von Schmertzing were rebuilt and put back into operation, the Escher hammer remained deserted. In August 1661, a flood again caused severe damage to the two remaining hammer mills. In 1670, Hannibal von Schmertzing obtained permission to build 17 houses for his workers and hereditary jurisdiction over the settlement. A few decades later, the number of buildings on the Hammerberg above Schmertzing's hammer mill had more than doubled. The rapid increase in population, which was due not least to exiles from neighboring Bohemia as a result of the Counter-Reformation there, prompted the construction of Rittersgrün's own church towards the end of the 17th century.

=== Diseases, war and hunger in the 18th century ===
In 1704, Johann August von Elterlein acquired the Arnoldshammer and six years later also took possession of the Schmertzing'schen Hammer, which he had already operated as a tenant since the 1690s. For the next 100 years, the Rittersgrün hammers remained the family's main employer. The second half of the 18th century was characterized by disease, famine and war. In 1756 and 1762, a leaf epidemic ravaged the village. Due to a famine in 1772, the number of deaths rose to 268, many times the usual number in the Rittersgrün community (1773: 35 deaths). In 1778, Rittersgrün was affected by the Bavarian War of Succession. During the invasion of a Free Corps, the three brothers August Benjamin von Elterlein, owner of the Rittersgrün hammer works, Johann Heinrich von Elterlein, owner of the hammer works in Großpöhla and Karl Heinrich von Elterlein, owner of the Pfeilhammer in Kleinpöhla, were abducted and released in the course of the Peace of Teschen. The Rittersgrün parish priest Ephraim Gottlieb Löscher noted in the church register: Some of the men "scattered through the village, broke into the houses and took what they found. They also broke into the parsonage here, beat my mother, the old pastor's mother, miserably, took about 200 thalers worth of clothes, linen and other things, smashed cupboards and boxes and finally chased me and mine out of the house."

=== Reorientation of industry and municipal amalgamation in the 19th century ===
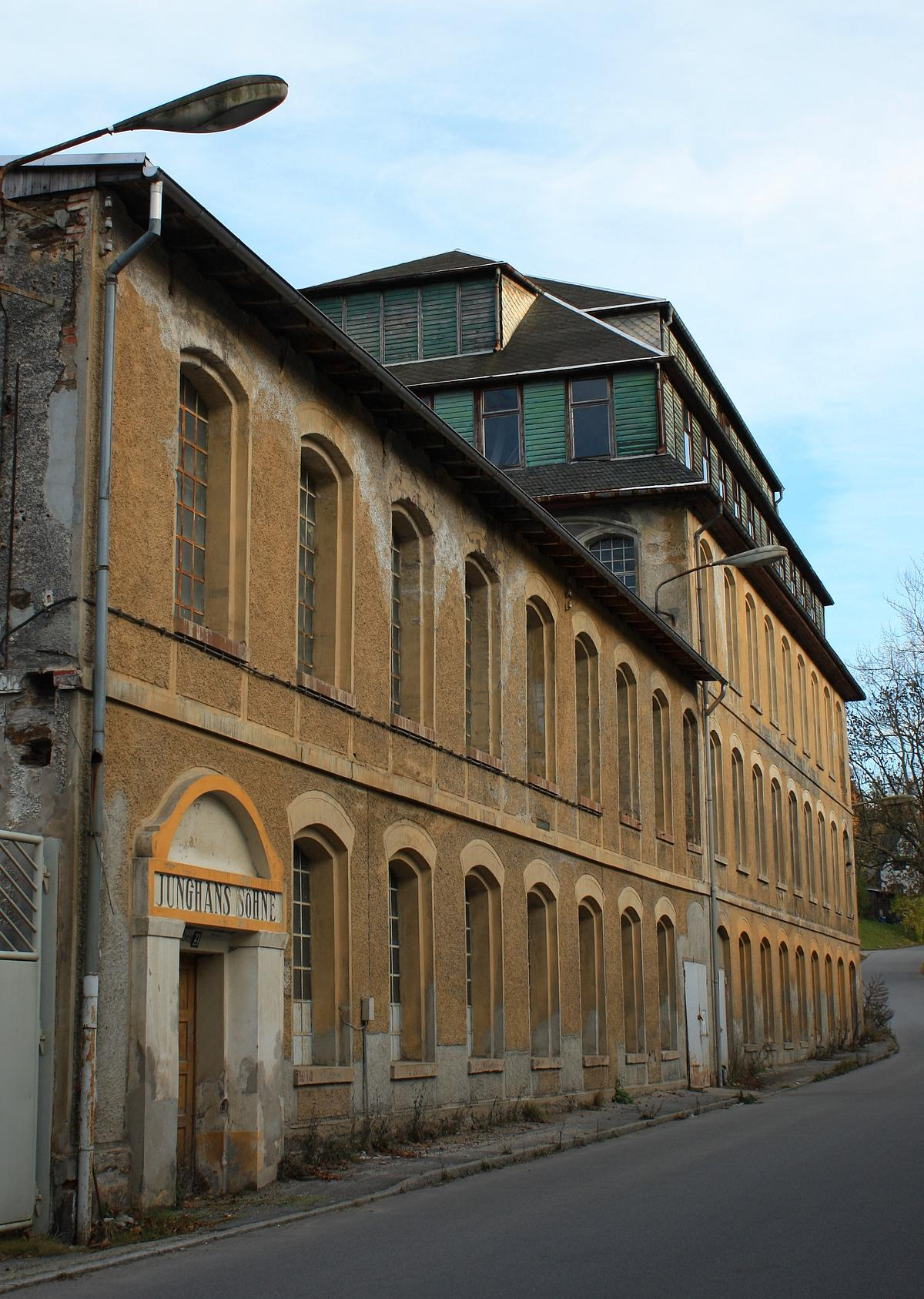
Industrial wasteland: Junghans Söhne factory site

The 19th century was characterized by the decline of the hammer industry and the emergence of new branches of industry. In 1812, only 51 people were still working in the two hammer mills. In 1818 and 1819, two lace-making schools were founded in Rittersgrün, where children learned the craft, which was mainly used by women as a sideline. At this time, ironworking in Rittersgrün was becoming less and less important, partly because it could not compete with the modern businesses in Westphalia and England. In the 1840s, the two hammer mills became the property of Nestler & Breitfeld, who introduced blast furnace operations and converted production. The decline in mining, ironworking, forestry and lace-making led to the impoverishment of the population, which reached its peak in 1846 and 1847 with a famine and outbreaks of scarlet fever and smallpox. A report by the Rittersgrün pastor Moritz Heinrich Rosenhauer, who was elected to the Saxon state parliament shortly afterwards, on the adverse conditions in his parish was published in the Leipziger Illustrirte Zeitung in March 1847. The hardship was alleviated by state grants and private donations in kind and money and the founding of relief and workers' support associations. After the merger of Ober-, Unter- and Hammerrittersgrün to form the municipality of Rittersgrün in 1856, new industries were established. The buildings in Arnoldshammer were used as a wood grinding shop, wood pulp factory and board cutting shop. Daniel Simon Junghans, a tanner from Raschau, together with the lace merchant August Wenzel, founded a wood grinding shop on the site of the former Schmertzing'schen Hammer and converted it into a cardboard factory. Two sawmills emerged from the Schmertzing hammer buildings a little further upstream. Carl Ludwig Flemming, the son of a brush maker from Schönheide, founded a wooden goods factory in Oberglobenstein in 1864, which is still in operation. The opening of the Pöhlatalbahn in 1889, a narrow-gauge railroad that connected Rittersgrün with Grünstädtel on the Annaberg-Buchholz-Schwarzenberg line, simplified the transportation of products from the Rittersgrün businesses and helped to open up Rittersgrün to tourism.

=== World wars and political changes in the 20th century ===
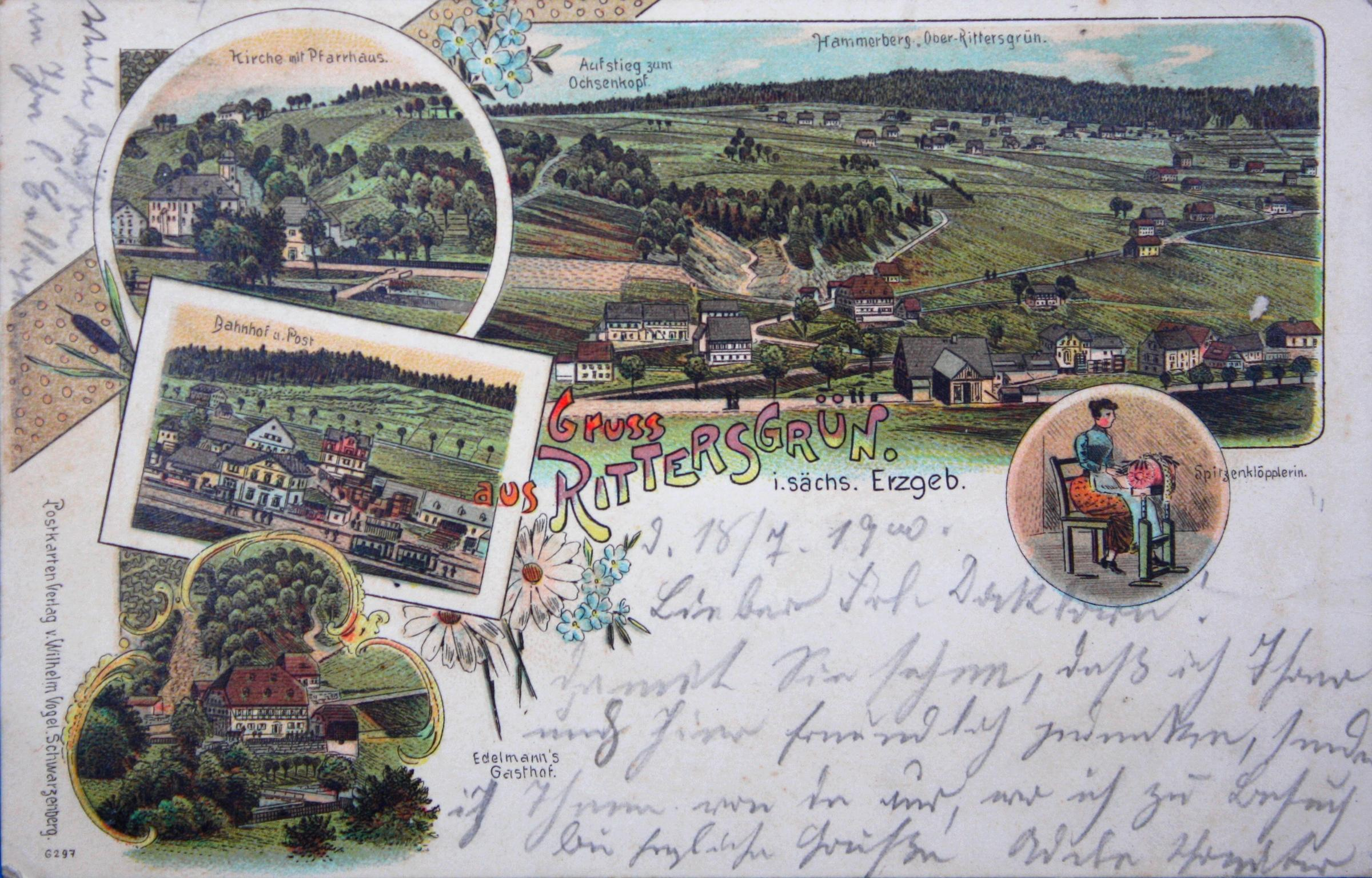
Rittersgrün at the beginning of the 20th century, lithograph around 1900

In the early years of the 20th century, the municipality's infrastructure was improved. In 1912, Rittersgrün was connected to the electricity grid. With the construction of today's Karlsbader Straße on the slope of the Unterrittersgrün district, traffic was routed out of the narrow valley. The First World War, in which over 100 Rittersgrün residents were killed, and the inflation up to 1923 had a severe impact on the Rittersgrün economy. Many Rittersgrün residents found work in the metal industry in Schwarzenberg during the 1920s. The construction of new industrial plants also created more jobs in Rittersgrün. The stocking factory built in 1911 by the Krefeld company Huppertz and Feltgen employed only women, apart from the manager. It was operated after the Second World War, including as VEB Kinderbekleidung Modesta, with more than 100 female workers. The JUNGHANS SÖHNE factory was also one of the main employers, employing up to 200 workers in the 1930s. During the Second World War, the industrial companies in Rittersgrün were converted for war purposes, which led to high profits for the local entrepreneurs.

In the first half of the 20th century, the development of tourism continued. Friends of local history founded a tourist association and the Reich Association for German Youth Hostels set up a district youth hostel in 1926, which was run (most recently privately) until 2008. At times, Rittersgrün was advertised as a high-altitude climatic health resort. Before the outbreak of the Second World War, there were around 60 different accommodations for holidaymakers in the municipality. The number of overnight stays rose to 16,837 from October 1940 to September 1941 due to vacation trips as part of the National Socialist "Strength through Joy" organization.

After the end of the Second World War, Rittersgrün was initially not occupied by Allied troops for a few weeks (see: Republic of Schwarzenberg) and then belonged to the Soviet occupation zone. The supply situation was poor due to the quartering of refugees. Production in the Rittersgrün factories resumed immediately after the end of the war. The first mayor after the end of the war, Paul Seidel (KPD), was replaced by Fritz Uloth (CDU) on September 1, 1946. From 1949 to 1954, SDAG Wismut mined uranium ore in several shafts on Rittersgrün land, for which hundreds of miners were housed in Rittersgrün families. The collectivization of farms led to the founding of the Rittersgrün Agricultural Production Cooperative in 1960. In 1972, all farms with more than ten employees were forcibly nationalized. The narrow-gauge railway line Grünstädtel-Oberrittersgrün had already been closed in 1971 because freight traffic had increasingly shifted to the roads.

In the wake of reunification, the mayor Brigitte Burger (SED), elected in 1984, resigned in February 1990 and was replaced in the same year by the newly elected Arnfried Viertel (CDU), whose party won 15 seats in the local elections, well ahead of the SPD (two seats), the BfD and the PDS (one seat each). With the help of federal subsidies, extensive renovation work was carried out at the beginning of the 1990s. The open-air swimming pool was put back into operation, roads and bridges were renewed, street lighting, drinking water pipes and the telephone network were gradually replaced. The cultural life of the community was promoted with the founding of new clubs and the establishment of a tourist office. As part of a village renewal program, a total of eight million euros was invested in the infrastructure of Rittersgrün during the term of office of Mayor Frank Siegel from 1994 to 1998. A large number of homes were built in the Arnoldshammer district and on the Hammerberg. After reunification, many businesses in Rittersgrün also closed down. Many residents lost their jobs, resulting in a high unemployment rate of 15 to 20 percent at the end of the century.

=== Incorporation ===
Tellerhäuser was incorporated into Rittersgrün on March 1, 1994. On January 1, 2007, Rittersgrün was incorporated into Breitenbrunn/Erzgeb.

=== Religion ===
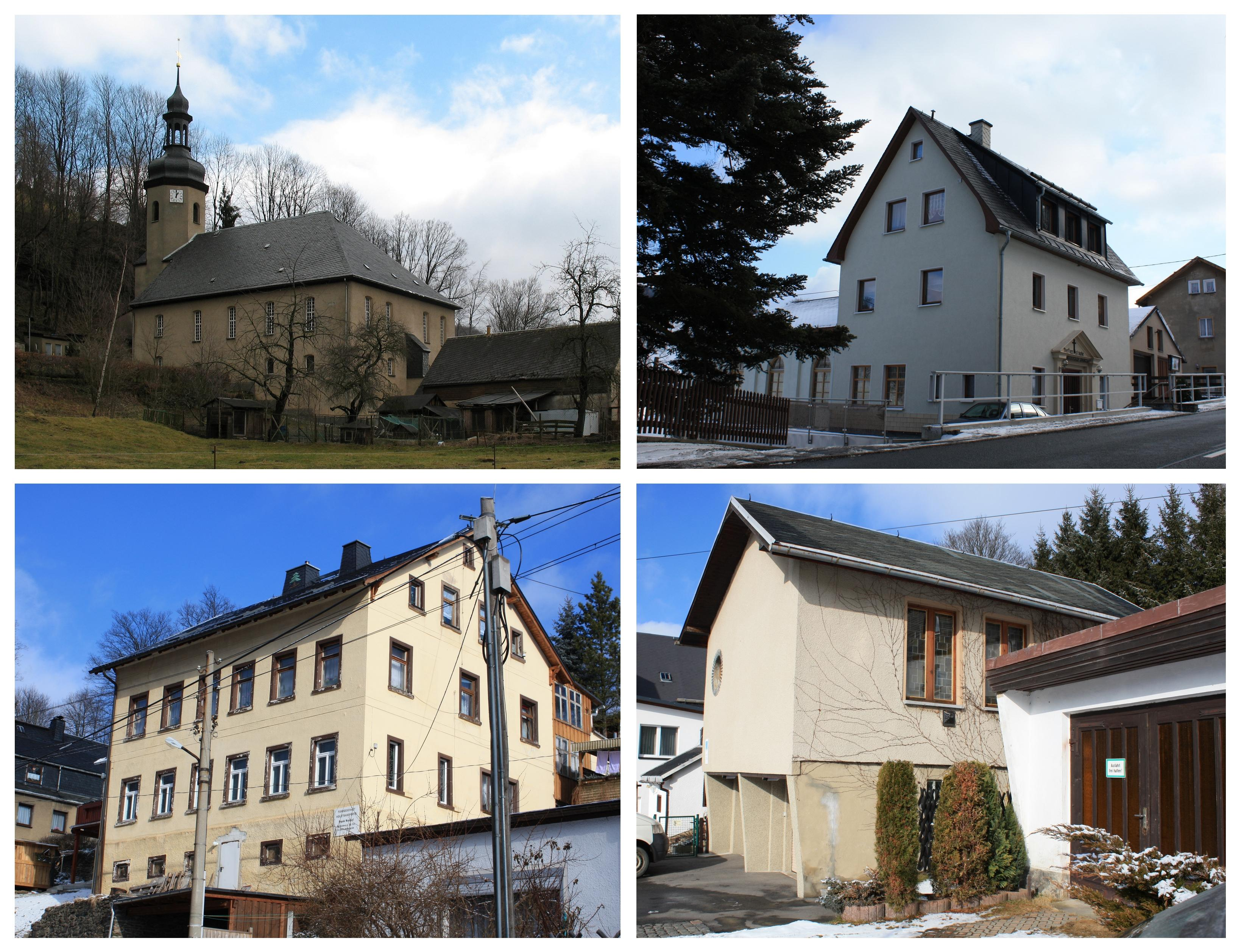
Church building in Rittersgrün

As the population of Rittersgrün grew steadily towards the end of the 17th century, so did the desire to no longer have to go to Breitenbrunn for church services. Although the people of Breitenbrunn had built their church at the upper end of the village to make the arduous journey easier for the people of Rittersgrün, the walk over the mountain was too inconvenient, especially in the winter months. The Escher Hammer, which had not been rebuilt after the Thirty Years' War and had been donated to the parish by the Elector in 1685, was quickly found to be a suitable location for a place of worship. The ruins of the Hammer lords' house were converted into a church, which was consecrated in 1693. Due to opposition from the Breitenbrunn parish priest, Rittersgrün initially remained a branch of Breitenbrunn and only became an independent parish with its own priest in 1718. Today, the parish has a sister relationship with Pöhla, with which it shares a priest. In addition to the Evangelical-Lutheran church, there is also an Evangelical-Methodist congregation in the village with a community hall built in 1901/1902 at the foot of the Rothenberg and a local branch of the Landeskirchliche Gemeinschaft with a parish hall consecrated in 1924 on Karlsbader Straße. A chapel set up in 1966 in the hall of the Arnoldshammer inn was dissolved in 1997 due to the declining number of members and unresolved ownership issues. The few Catholic inhabitants of Rittersgrün travel to Schwarzenberg for church services. A Catholic service is held once a month in the parish hall of the Evangelical-Lutheran parish.

=== Population development ===
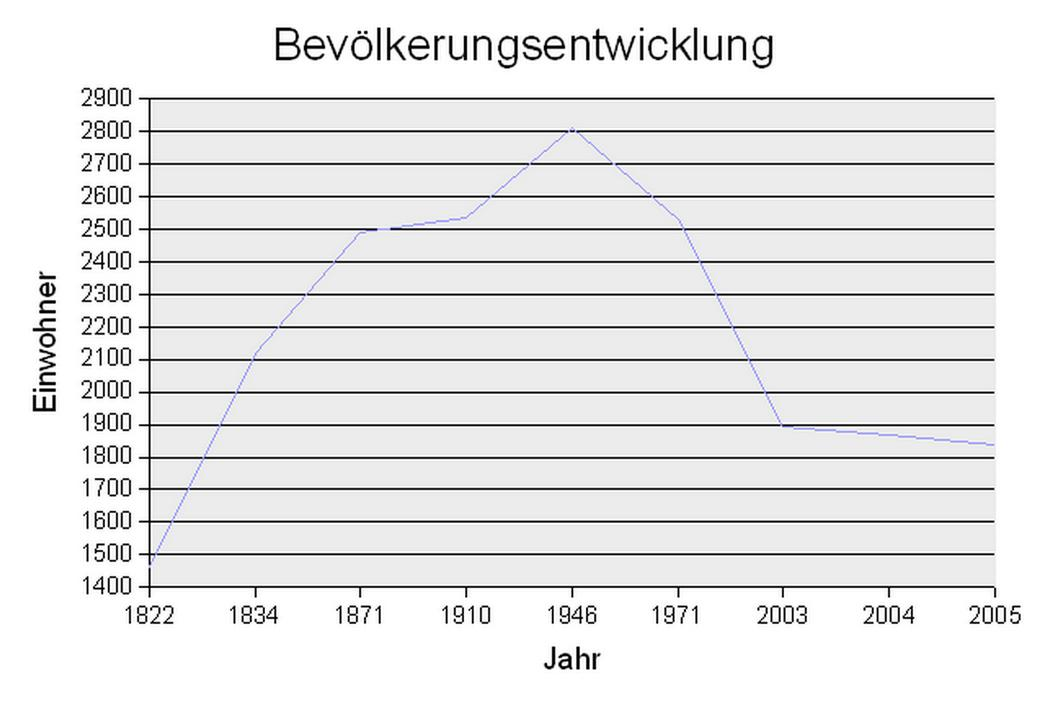
Population development

Exact figures on the population development in the early days of the settlement are not known due to the poor availability of sources. What is certain is that the population increase in the first centuries was mainly due to the influx of workers in the hammer mills and surrounding mines. The first reliable indication of the number of inhabitants in all three parts of Rittersgrün is a family list from 1701, according to which around 115 families lived in Rittersgrün at this time, the majority of whom were economically dependent on the hammer mills. Almost a quarter of all heads of household worked as miners, ten woodcutters and six charcoal burners worked in the forest, hammer smiths, blast furnace workers, coal cutters, carters and day laborers ensured the operation of the hammer mills. Overall, living conditions were poor for the majority of the population. Infant mortality was high and incomes were low. Older inhabitants in particular had to work as day laborers, some women earned some extra money by making lace, and at least five people lived as beggars in the village. Due to the flourishing hammer mill business, the number of inhabitants rose sharply over the course of the 19th century. By 1834, it had risen to over 2000 and reached its peak of almost 3000 inhabitants in the middle of the 20th century. Since then, the number of inhabitants has fallen due to the decline in the birth rate and, since the fall of communism and the peaceful revolution in the GDR, the exodus of young people. Before the incorporation into Breitenbrunn, the population was around 1,800. In 2009, just over 1,600 people lived in Rittersgrün.

1822: around 1460; 1834: 2119; 1871: 2488; 1910: 2533; 1946: 2812; 1971: 2528	2003: 1893; 2004: 1867; 2005: 1839; 2009: 1625; 2011: 1610

== Politics ==
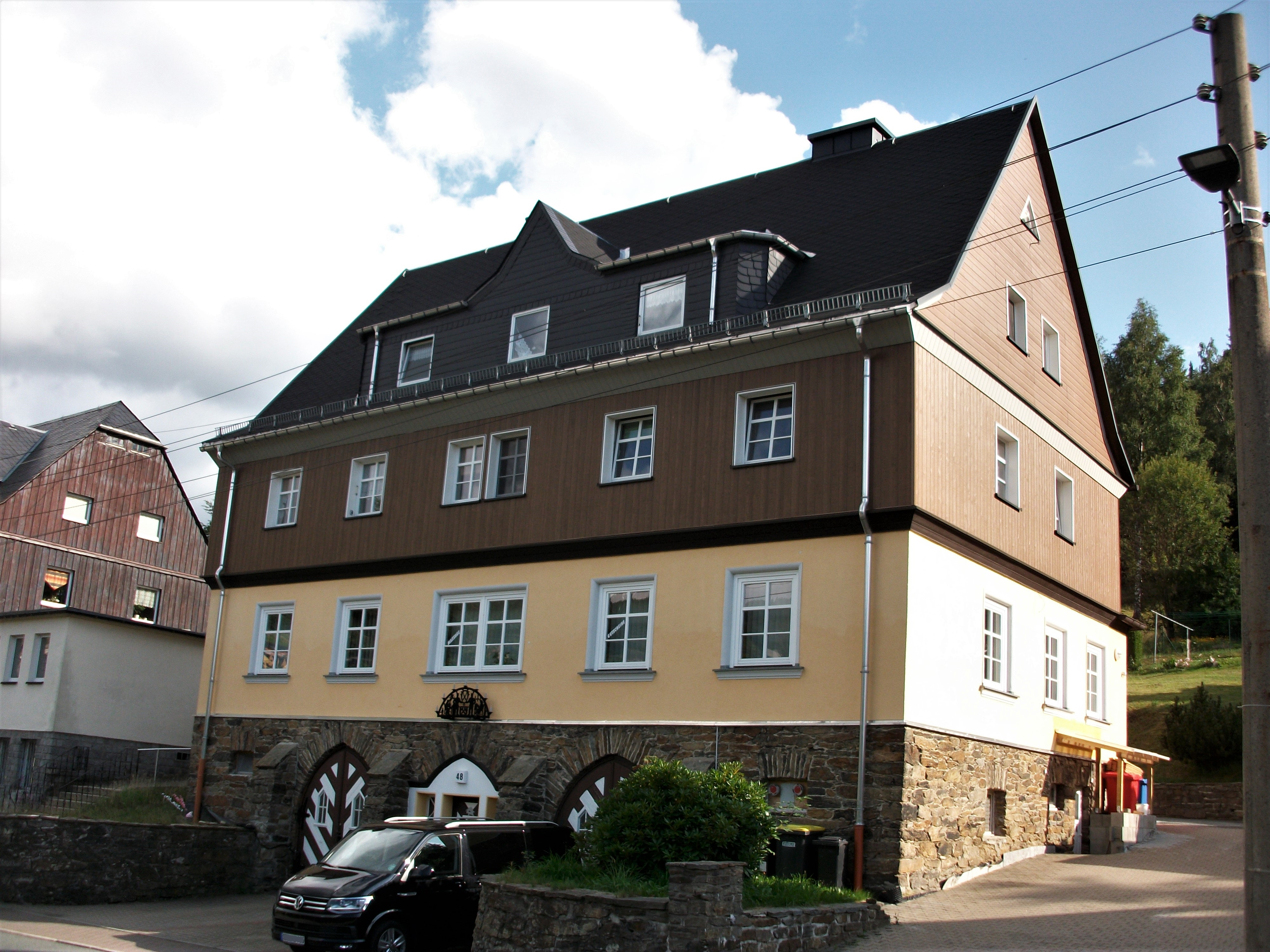
Town hall Rittersgrün

- The last municipal council was elected on June 13, 2004. Eight of the twelve seats went to the independent voter association WIR (62.9% of all votes) and four to the CDU (37.1%).
- On September 2, 1994, the municipality of Rittersgrün, the municipality of Antonsthal and the municipality of Breitenbrunn/Erzgeb. decided to establish the administrative community of Breitenbrunn/Erzgeb.
- On November 7, 2006, the municipalities of Breitenbrunn/Erzgeb. and Rittersgrün agreed to merge in the form of a municipal incorporation, which came into effect on January 1, 2007, following resolutions by both municipal councils.

=== Local council ===
In the local council elections on June 7, 2009, three of the six seats went to the independent voter association WIR (53.1% of all votes) and the CDU (46.9%). In the elections to the local council on May 25, 2014, four of the six seats were held by the Freie Wählergemeinschaft WIR (65.4% of all votes) and two by the CDU (34.6% of all votes).

== Culture and sights ==
=== Museums ===
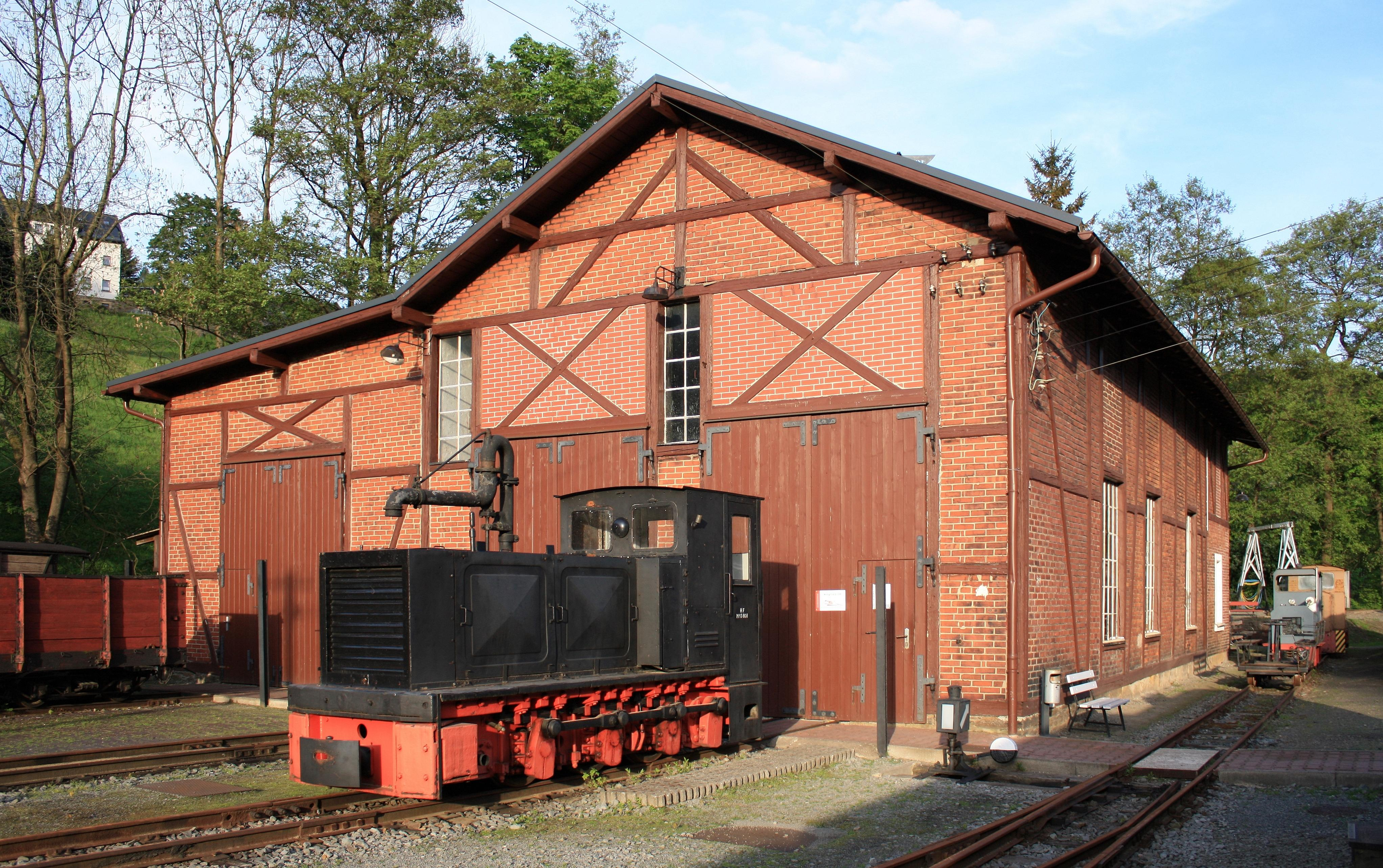
Saxon Narrow Gauge Railway Museum

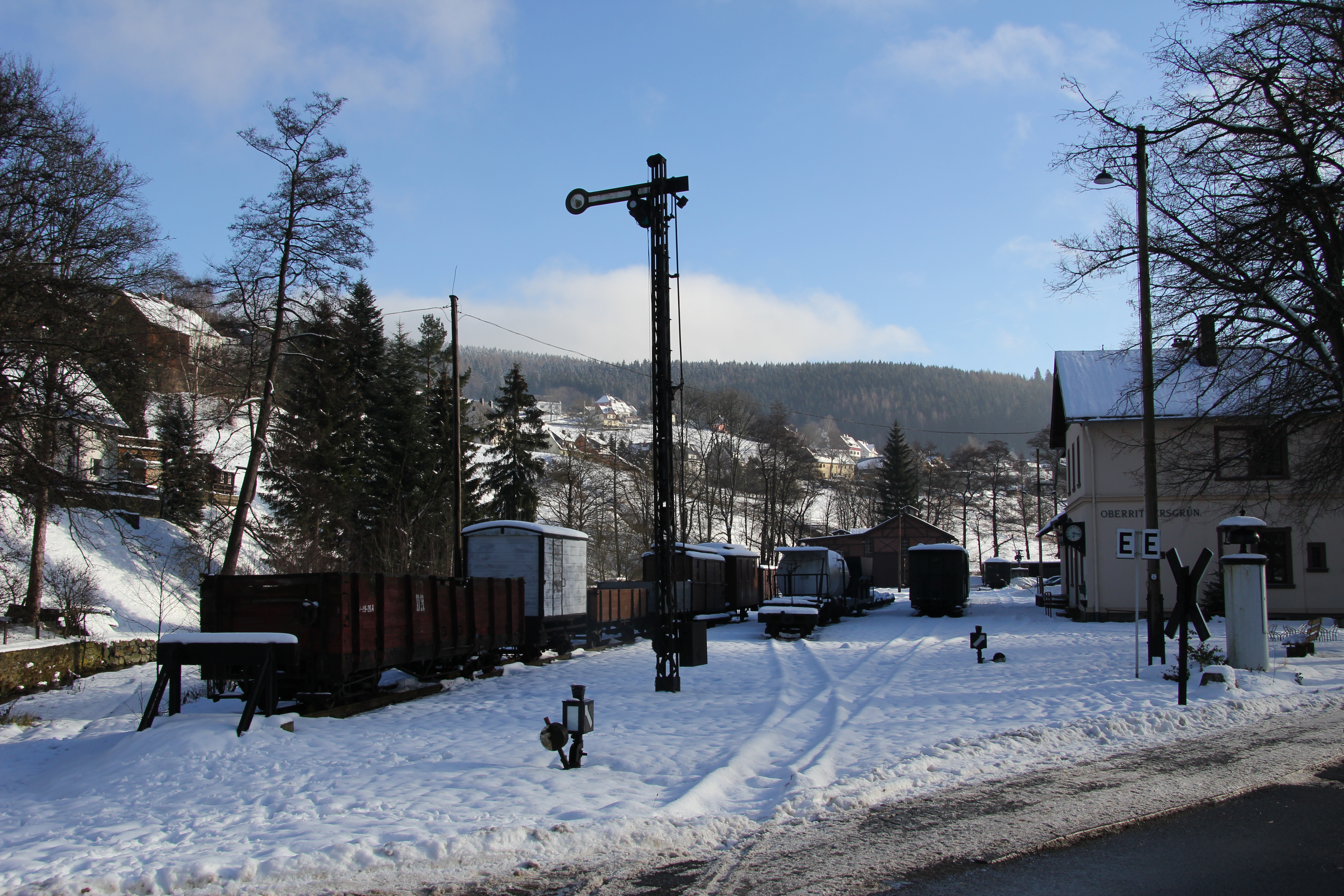
Oberrittersgrün railroad station (2015)

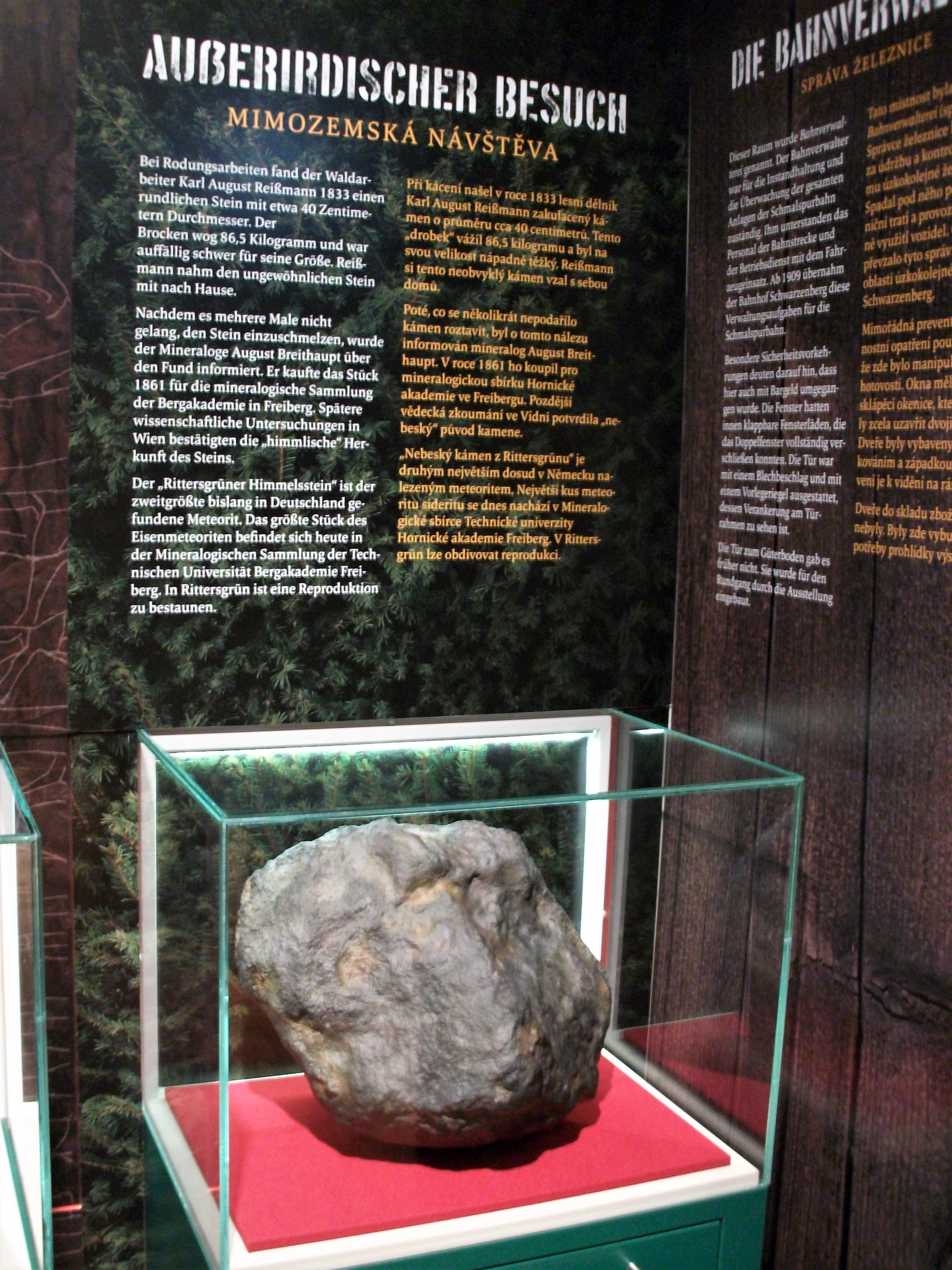
Rittersgrün meteorite (reproduction in the Saxon Narrow Gauge Railway Museum Rittersgrün)

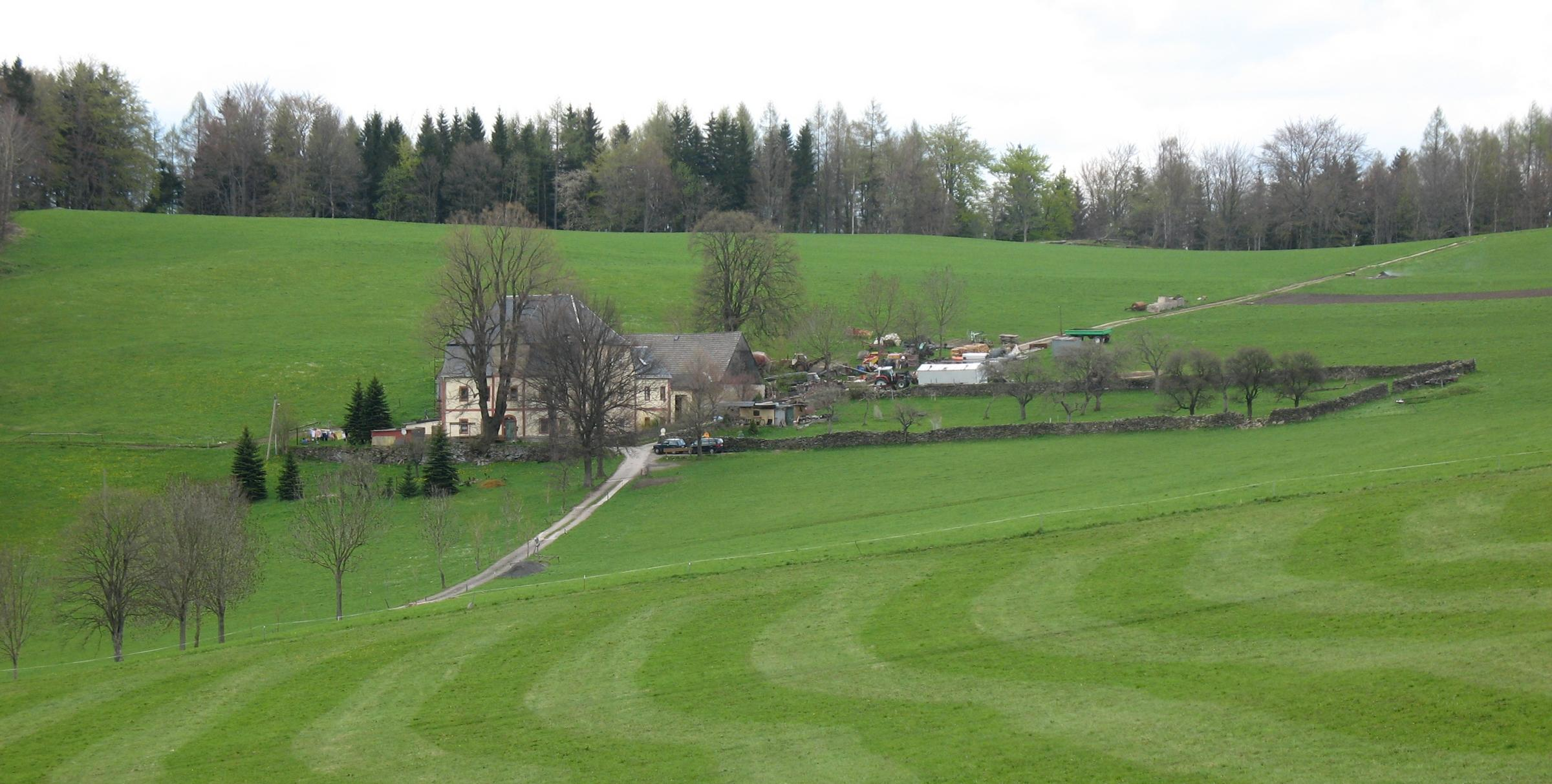
Rock straw

Saxon Narrow Gauge Railway Museum

The terminus of the Grünstädtel-Oberrittersgrün narrow-gauge railroad, which closed in 1971, was founded in 1977 as the first railroad museum in the GDR and is now run as the Saxon Narrow-Gauge Railway Museum Rittersgrün. It comprises the station building, which houses the tourist office and a small exhibition, an engine shed and an outdoor area with historic carriages and locomotives.

Holzschleiferei Weigel The Holzschleiferei Weigel Technical Museum, which was set up in 1990 after production was shut down, displays old machines, transmissions, turbines and a large water wheel for driving.

=== Rittersgrüner Meteorite ===
A meteorite found in the forest near Ehrenzipfel in 1833 attracted national attention. The forest worker Karl August Reißmann came across the 86.5 kg iron meteorite during clearing work and initially stored it in front of his house as it could not be melted in various ironworks. Following a tip-off from Pfeilhammer's shift foreman, Freiberg mineralogy professor August Breithaupt traveled to Rittersgrün and bought the lump for the Freiberg Mining Academy's mineralogical collection. A plaster model of the meteorite is on display in the narrow-gauge railway museum.

=== Hiking trails ===
In addition to a number of smaller hiking trails, the cross-border Anton-Günther-Weg hiking trail, which passes the Wettinplatz with an Anton-Günther memorial stone at Ehrenzipfel, and the Pöhla-Rittersgrün mining nature trail, which can be used to reach various old mining and bismuth facilities, lead through Rittersgrün. A partially completed combined cycle and hiking trail between Rittersgrün and Raschau runs along the route of the narrow-gauge railroad, which was discontinued in 1971. Since 2009, a 30-kilometre cross-border bridle path has led from Rittersgrün via Halbemeile, Pernink and Nejdek to Děpoltovice and the Karlovy Vary district of Stará Role.

=== Buildings ===
- The Evangelical Lutheran parish church in Rittersgrün, consecrated in 1693, was built on the foundations of Escher's Hammerherrenhaus and is one of the oldest buildings in the parish, together with the rectory, which originated from the hammer mill. There is a mountain cemetery on the north side of the church. Below the cemetery on the south side is a memorial to the people of Rittersgrün who died in the wars.
- Along Kirchstraße there are several listed, partly plastered half-timbered houses, including the former church school, inaugurated in 1832, the former Bück Dich inn, built in 1802 on the ruins of the Schmertzing'schen Gezähschmiede forge, and the semi-detached house, which was given the name Wamsärmelschenk by the filming of the DEFA film Sankt Urban in 1969.
- The Obere Rother-Adler-Stollen was the last old mining facility in Rittersgrün from 1842 to 1893 and, following its renovation in the mid-1990s, can be visited over a length of 150 meters. Below the entrance to the gallery is the Huthaus with a delicate ridge turret, which is now used as a residential building, and a powder tower, which was built in 1882 after two powder explosions with a total of seven fatalities.
- The Rockstrohgut estate on a ridge above Arnoldshammer was probably built in 1777 as the widow's residence of the Rockstroh family, lords of the hammer. The late Baroque residential building of the four-sided farm has a high mansard roof, a narrow central risalit with a bay window and a spacious staircase. The neighboring orchard is surrounded by a high dry stone wall.
- An Ernst Thälmann memorial grove was established near the upper end of Rittersgrün in 1960. The memorial in the form of an obelisk was redesigned in 2011 and since then has commemorated the victims of the death march of concentration camp prisoners from the Berga/Elster subcamp to Theresienstadt, which passed through Rittersgrün in April 1945. There is a plaque at the memorial for the courier Guido Pilz from Lauter, who was murdered in 1935.
- At Wettinplatz near Ehrenzipfel, visitors can visit the Fuchsloch tunnel, which is maintained by the Rittersgrün Miners' Association. The Wettin Fountain was inaugurated in 1889 in honor of the Saxon Wettin dynasty. Since 1996, a memorial stone has commemorated the Ore Mountains singer and folk poet Anton Günther.
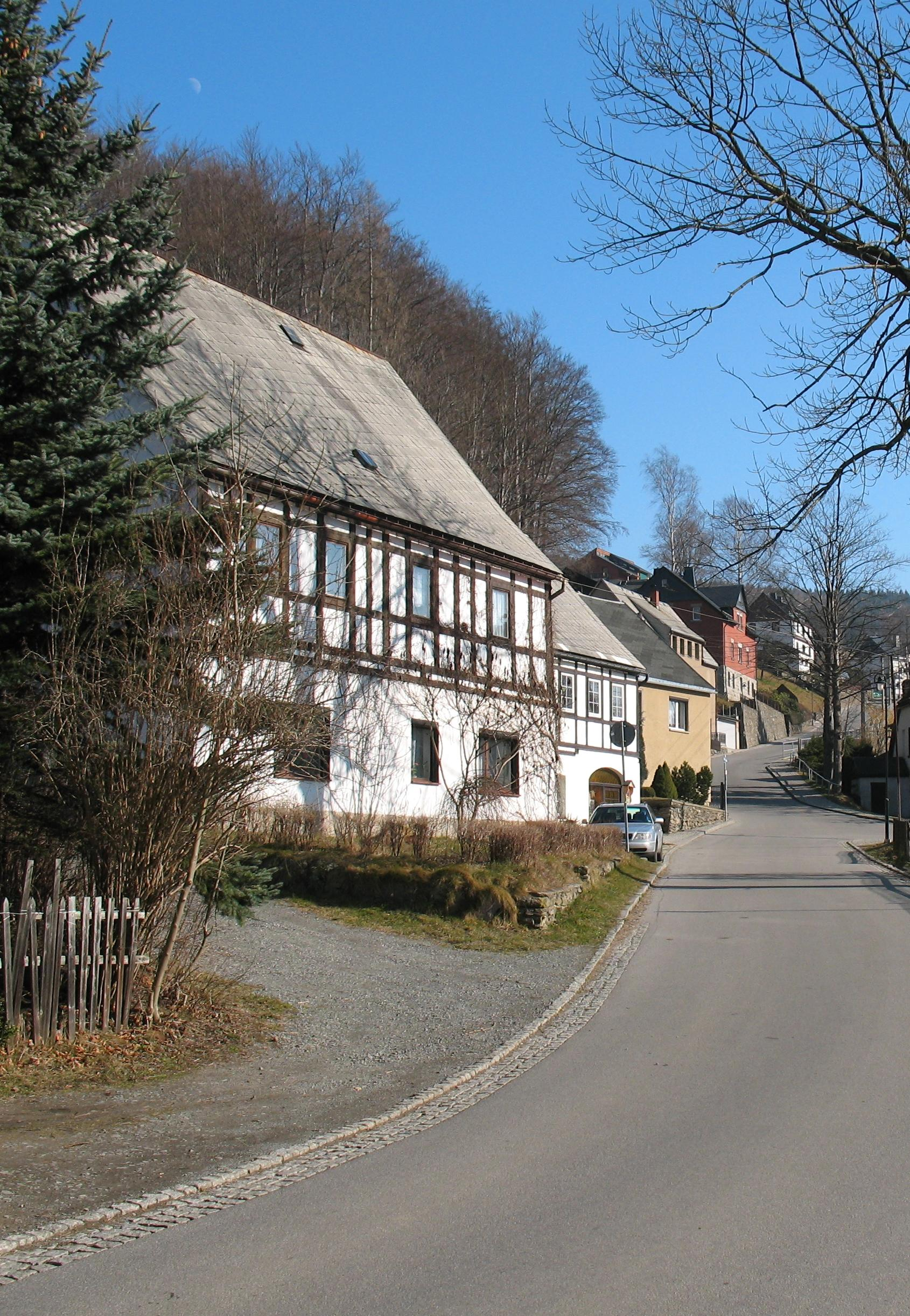
Listed half-timbered houses, Hammerbergstraße in the background

Mouth of the Upper Rothen-Adler Adit

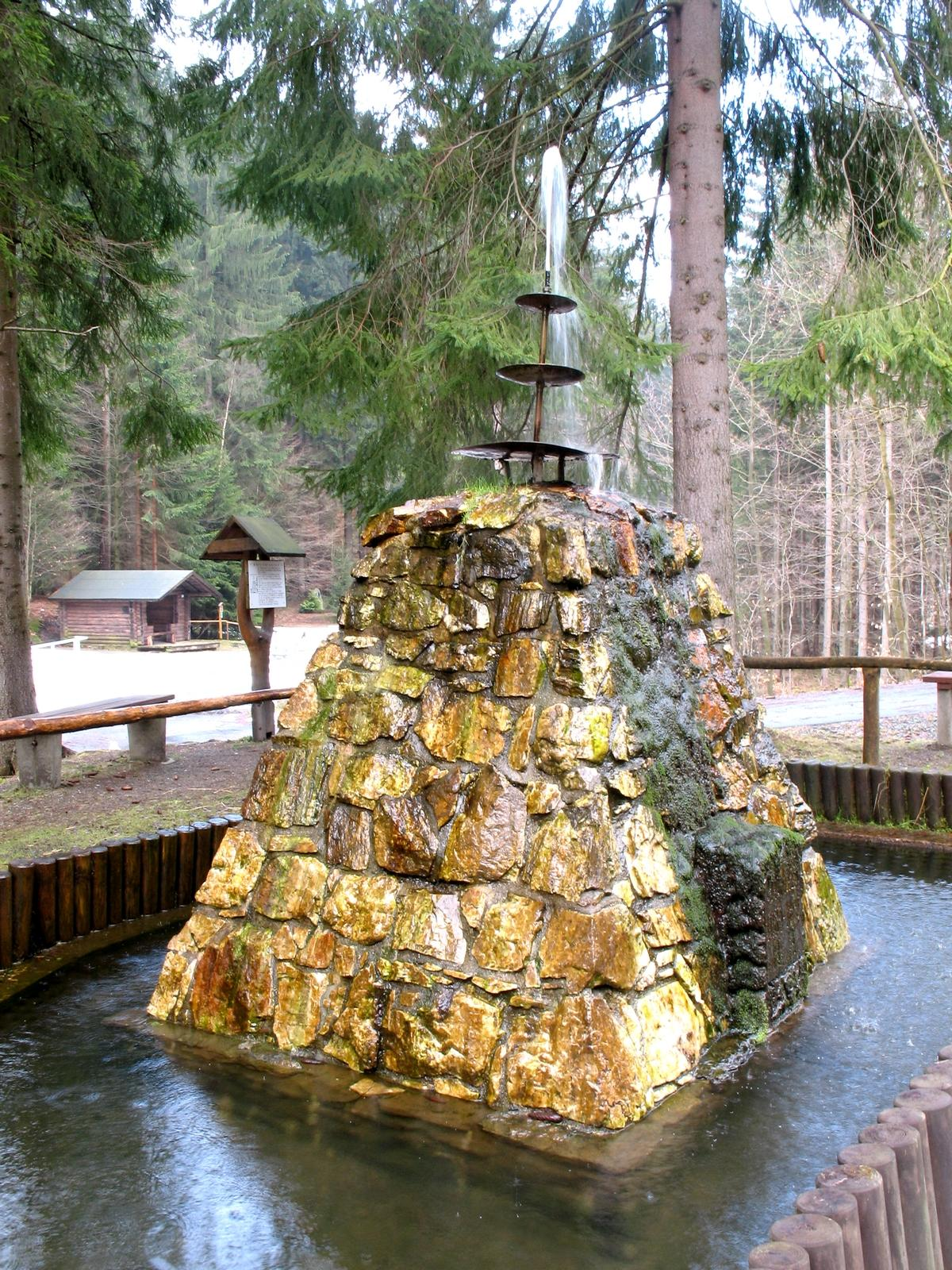
Wettin fountain near Ehrenzipfel

=== Regular events ===
Every year in June, a three-day station festival is held on the grounds of the Saxon Narrow Gauge Railway Museum, including a mat jumping event for children on the Hammerberg ski jump. In 2004, the Rittersgrün Fox Hunt, which was first held in 1978, was brought back to life by a support association. At the event, which takes place annually on the first Sunday in October, a rider marked with a foxtail is hunted. Participants include a partner equestrian club from Děpoltovice near Karlovy Vary. The supporting program includes falconry demonstrations, equestrian games, hunting horn blowing and riding for everyone. On the 1st Advent, the Rittersgrün open-air Christmas pyramid is set up with the participation of the head of the village, the pastor and the brass choir of the Evangelical Lutheran parish and the Rittersgrün miners' association.

=== Associations ===
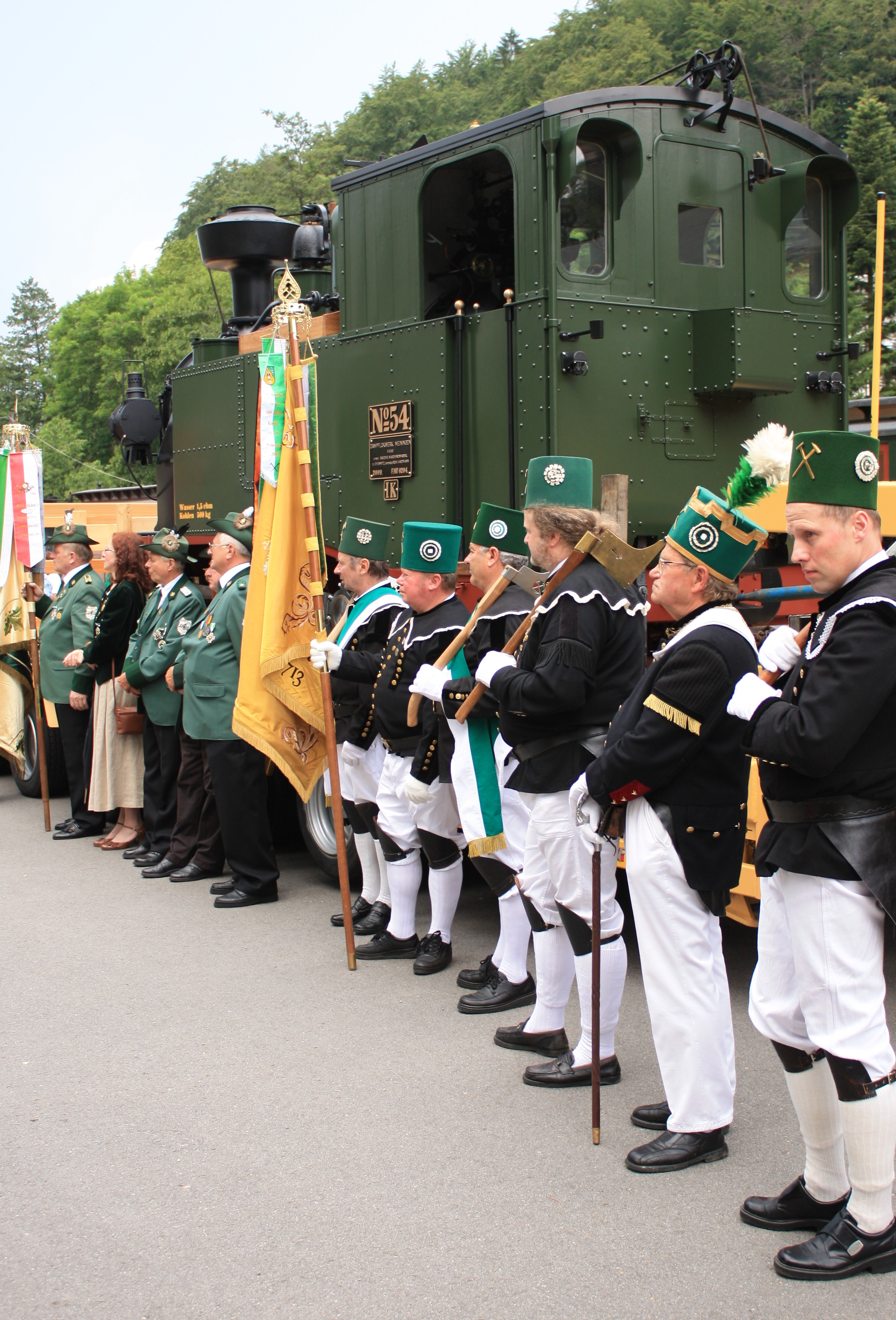
Members of the miners' association and the shooting club

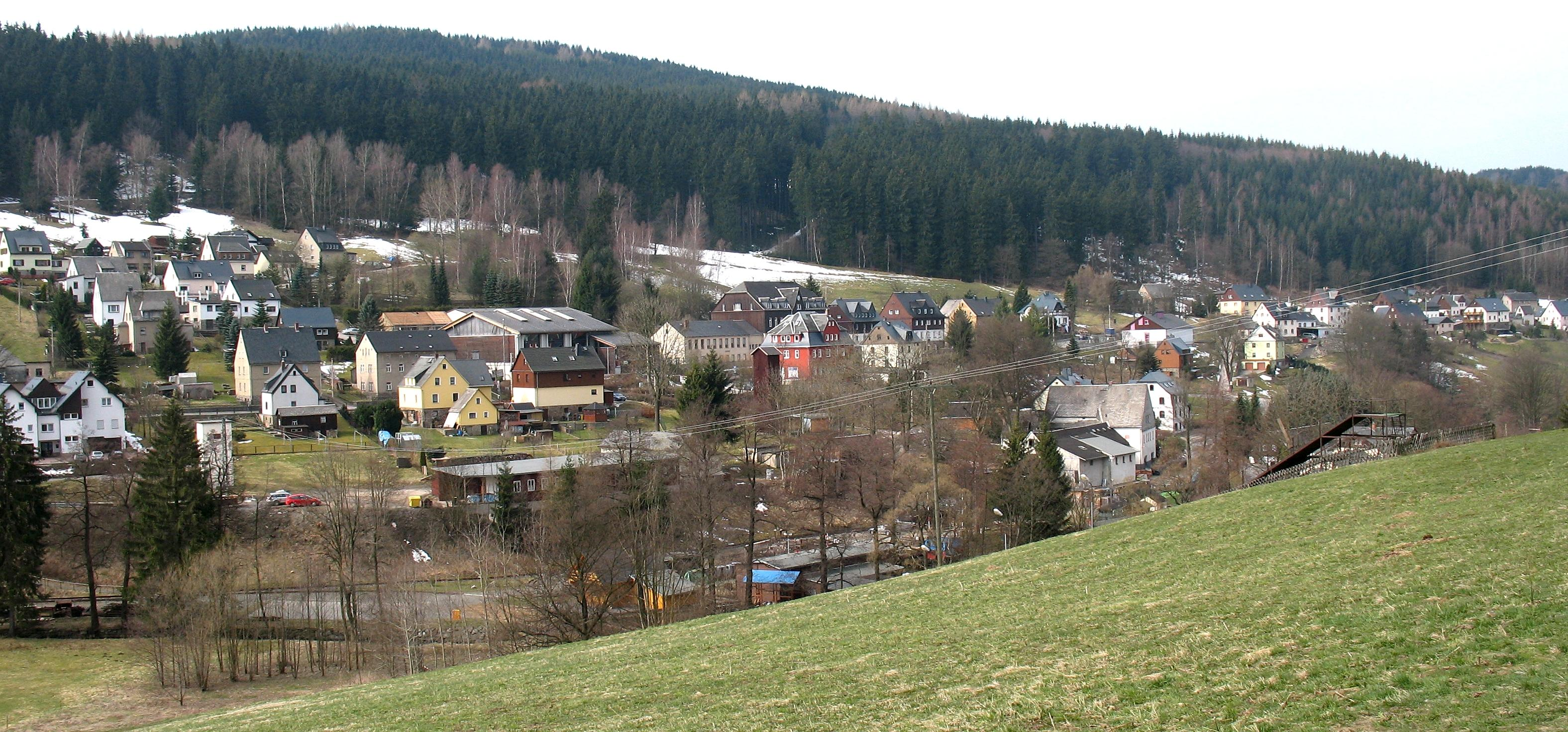
Town center with multi-purpose hall, Hammerbergschanze on the right edge of the picture

The Rittersgrün association with the longest tradition is the Knappschaft Rittersgrün 1713 e. V., which was founded in 1713 as a mining burial fraternity and today, in addition to ceremonial funerals, mainly takes part in mining parades and maintains the Pöhla-Rittersgrün mining nature trail. The Gut Heil German Gymnastics Club was founded in 1880, followed by a military choral society in 1890, the Frei Heil workers' sports club in 1907, a cyclists' club in 1919, a workers' choral society in 1922 and a military shooting club in 1923. The community's club life was supplemented by the Rittersgrün/Pöhla woodcarving club, the Waldfrieden gardening club and an ore mountain branch club.

With the exception of the Rittersgrün miners' association, all of the community's clubs were disbanded after the Second World War. Winter sports, athletics, handball, fistball, artistic cycling and chess were practiced in the Rittersgrün sports community founded in 1949. Together with the municipality, the sports community completed the construction of an outdoor swimming pool, which was started in 1938 and is fed by the waters of the Cunnersbach, a tributary of the Pöhlwasser.

Today, Rittersgrün is mainly home to the Erzgebirgszweigverein, which was re-established in 1991, the Schützenverein 1883 and the Freie Sportverein 1907 with its handball, skiing, recreational soccer and fistball sections. The gymnasium at the northern entrance to the village, inaugurated in 1926, was replaced by a new building at the school. The Hammerbergschanze, inaugurated in 1986, is located near the railroad station. There is also the Rittersgrüner Fuchsjagd support association, a tourist association, a senior citizens' association, the Chronistenstammtisch and the Rittersgrün volunteer fire department, which was founded in 1879 and has 25 active members.

== Economy and infrastructure ==
=== Traffic ===
Rittersgrün is located on the state road 271, which leads to the federal highway 101 in Raschau, via which the highway can be reached. A connecting road, which joins the S 271 in the center of the village, leads to neighboring Breitenbrunn. There is a regular bus service between Schwarzenberg and Tellerhäuser. In winter, ski buses run between Johanngeorgenstadt, Rittersgrün, Boží Dar and Oberwiesenthal.

From 1889 to 1971, Rittersgrün was located on the upper section of the Grünstädtel-Oberrittersgrün narrow-gauge railroad. The Unterrittersgrün stop and the Oberrittersgrün station, which has been home to the Saxon Narrow Gauge Railway Museum since 1977, were located in the municipality. Today, the nearest railroad station on the Johanngeorgenstadt-Schwarzenberg line is in Breitenbrunn.

=== Public facilities ===
Even before the incorporation of Rittersgrün into Breitenbrunn, the municipal administration was relocated to Breitenbrunn. Individual departments of the municipal administration hold regular consultation hours in a citizens' office in the station building. The Rittersgrün tourist information office is housed in the same building. The nearest police station is in Schwarzenberg. The depot of the volunteer fire department is located at the upper end of Rittersgrün.

The district has two daycare centers. The AWO-Kinderland is located in a building above the school that was inaugurated in 1979 as the Soyuz-31 kindergarten. A private daycare center founded in 1997, which uses Montessori teaching methods, is located in Globenstein.

=== Education ===
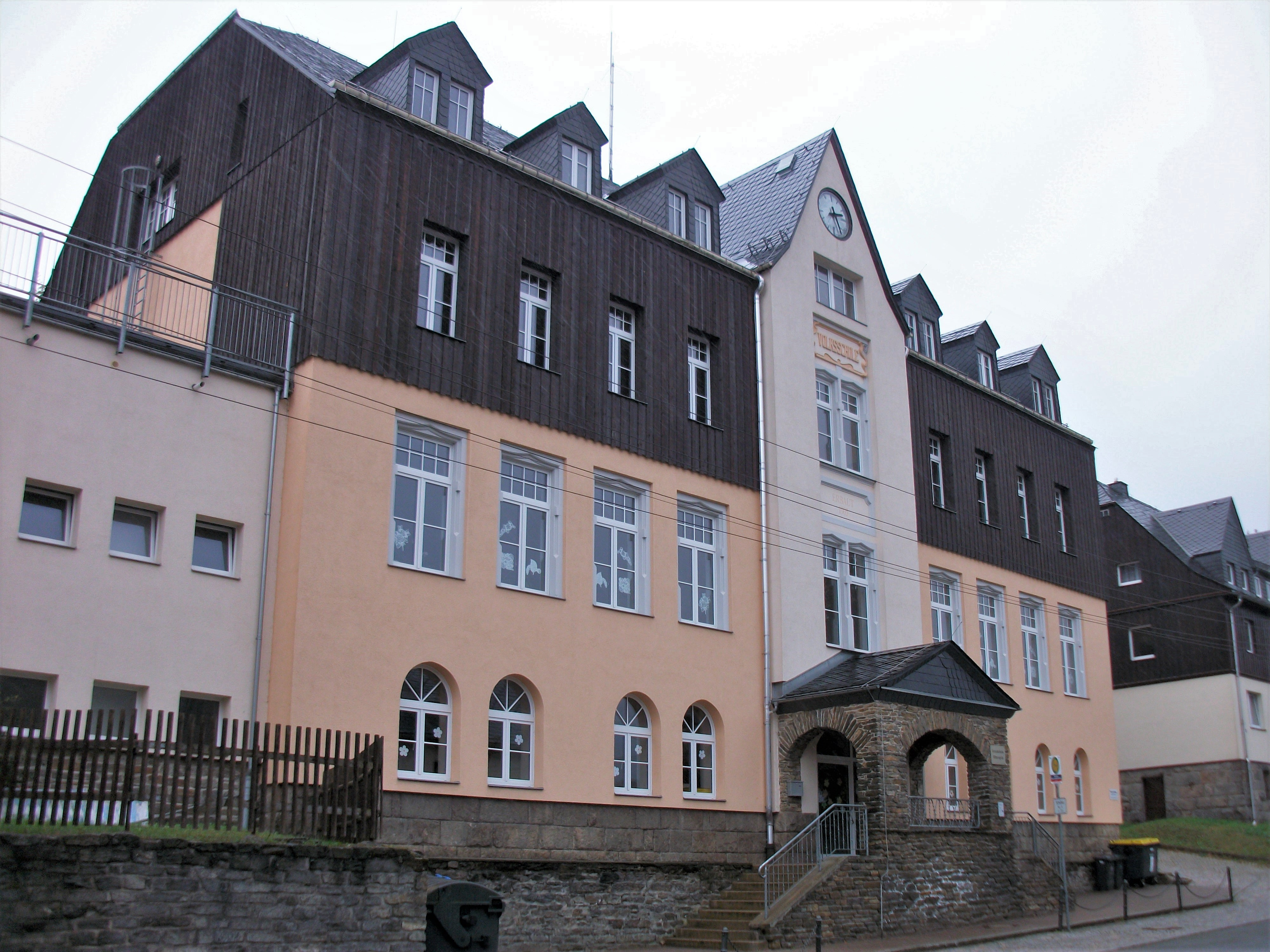
Rittersgrün elementary school

The oldest church register of the parish mentions a schoolmaster in Rittersgrün as early as the end of the 17th century. It is not known whether a school building already existed at this time. What is certain is that in 1832 a new school building was erected near the church to replace a building that had been demolished in 1830. In the mid-1830s, around 200 pupils were taught in two classes each by a girls' and a boys' teacher. For capacity reasons, further school buildings were opened in the upper part of the village and on the Hammerberg in 1851 and 1878 and the number of teachers was increased. In 1905, a central school building for all pupils in Rittersgrün was inaugurated above the railroad station. In the year of its opening, six teachers were responsible for 541 pupils. A further education school and a vocational school for women were also attached to the school. From the 1960s onwards, pupils from Tellerhausen also had to attend classes in Rittersgrün, which made an extension necessary, which was completed in 1971. Since then, the school has been run as a Polytechnic Secondary School. After the collapse of the GDR, it initially housed a primary and secondary school.

The secondary school was closed in 2007 and relocated to Breitenbrunn. In return, the primary school pupils from Breitenbrunn attend the school in Rittersgrün, which has only one class of around 80 pupils (as of the 2008/09 school year).

=== Business and tourism ===
After the fall of communism in 1989/90, most of the larger industrial companies were closed down. Several former production sites, including the large factory complex of the Junghans Söhne company between the church and the railroad station, are now empty. The Modesta textile factory building was demolished. Globenstein is now home to Globensteiner Holzwerkstätten GmbH and the trading company Henka Werkzeuge und Werkzeugmaschinen GmbH. Werkzeugbau Weigel GmbH in Arnoldshammer manufactures tools primarily for injection molding and press shops. Rittersgrün is also home to a car dealership, various craft businesses and smaller stores, a hotel with a restaurant, several guesthouses and restaurants and a large number of private vacation accommodations. The aims of the Rittersgrün Tourist Association, founded in 1991, include the coordination of important tourism-related tasks between the municipality, tourism-oriented associations and landlords. The association maintains a tourist office for Rittersgrün and Tellerhäuser in the main building of the railroad museum.

== Notable people ==
- Roswietha Zobelt (born 1954), rower, Olympic winner
- Stephanie Schneider (born 1990), bobsledder

=== Honorary citizen ===
- November 1933: Martin Mutschmann, NSDAP district leader and Reich governor of Saxony
