= Hammerberg =

Hammerberg is a family name. Notable people with it include:

- Billie Hammerberg (1936–1995), Australian actress
- Francis P. Hammerberg (1920–1945), American naval diver
- Traci Hammerberg (1966–1984), American murder victim

== See also ==
- USS Hammerberg
