= 1590 Neulengbach earthquake =

Destructive earthquake in 16th-century Austria

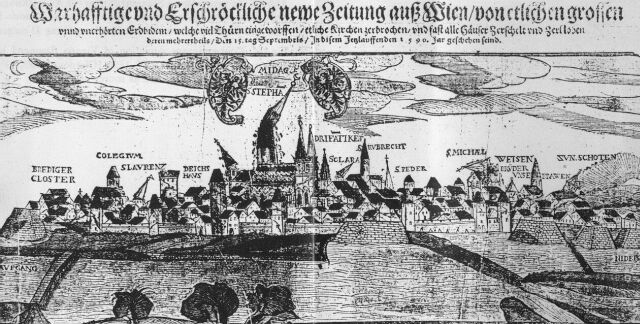
- Contemporary illustration of the damage in Vienna

- Local date: 15 September 1590
- Local time: Near midnight
- Magnitude: 6.06±0.47 M_{w}
- Epicenter: 48.3°N 15.5°E
- Type: Unknown
- Total damage: Severe
- Max. intensity: MMI VII (Very strong)–MMI IX (Violent)
- Casualties: Unknown

The Neulengbach earthquake of 1590 occurred on 15 September shortly before midnight amidst a long series of much weaker seismic activity starting on 29 June and with aftershocks reported until 12 November. It was the strongest historically documented earthquake in what today is Northeastern Austria.

== Epicenter and seismology ==
The epicenter is believed to have been located southeast of Neulengbach, about 30–40 km west of Vienna, in a flat dipping and north–south striking thrust fault that is part of the Vienna Transform fault zone. This moderately-active fault system extends over a distance of some 300 km from the Northern Limestone Alps through the Vienna Basin into the West Carpathian Mountains. The earthquake's magnitude is estimated at 6.06±0.47 M_{w} and it had a shaking intensity of VII (very strong) on the modified Mercalli intensity scale in most of Lower Austria.

== Damage ==
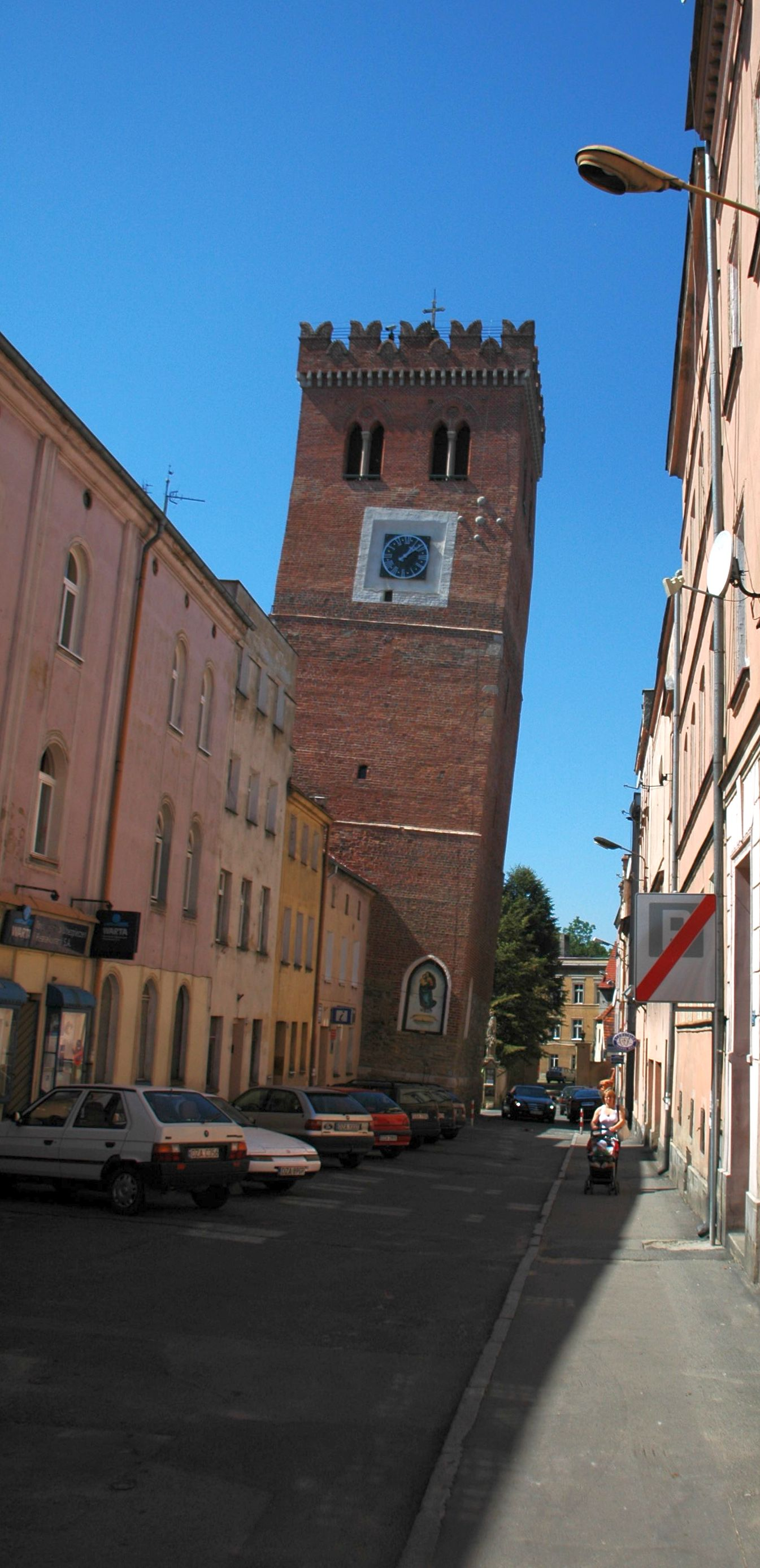
The damaged city tower of Ząbkowice Śląskie

Significant destruction occurred in Vienna, which at this time had about 50,000 inhabitants living within a fortified and densely urban area that covered what today is the innermost city center. The upper half of St. Michael's church tower collapsed in spite of its steel reinforcements, the Scottish Abbey was severely damaged, and the Southern tower of St. Stephen's Cathedral suffered as well. At this time it was not customary to document damage to property that did not serve sacral purposes or was directly used by the aristocracy, and very little information has survived concerning the destruction and harm inflicted on ordinary citizens. Therefore, the fact that the death of nine people in a collapsing traveller's hostel was specifically mentioned in the chronicles suggests that the number of urban casualties cannot have been significant.

At Zwentendorf, 40 km to the north of the presumed epicenter, the local parish church was so heavily damaged that it became unusable. (Exposure of this particular area to seismic risk played a significant role in the public debate that erupted in the 1970s concerning plans for the Zwentendorf Nuclear Power Plant.) Vaults and roofs collapsed at the Mauerbach Charterhouse West of Vienna, and many fortifications in Lower Austria (e.g., at Sieghartskirchen and Altlengbach) needed substantial repair.

Apparently, the seismic event propagated far along the Vienna Transform fault but did not extend southward of the Alps. Strong shocks were reported from up to 300 km to the north of the epicenter, at places such as Abertham in the westernmost part of Bohemia and Frankenstein in Silesia where the slightly leaning city tower can still be seen.

== Implications for current seismic risk ==
Today, the area that was most heavily affected by the 1590 Neulengbach earthquake has a population of over 2.5 million and accounts for almost half of Austria's economic output. A 2007 study by the reinsurance company Munich Re estimated a damage potential of €10–15 billion in private property alone should a comparable event occur again.

== See also ==
- List of historical earthquakes
