= Mauerbach Charterhouse =

Former monastery in Lower Austria, Austria

Coordinates: 48°15′03″N 16°10′02″E

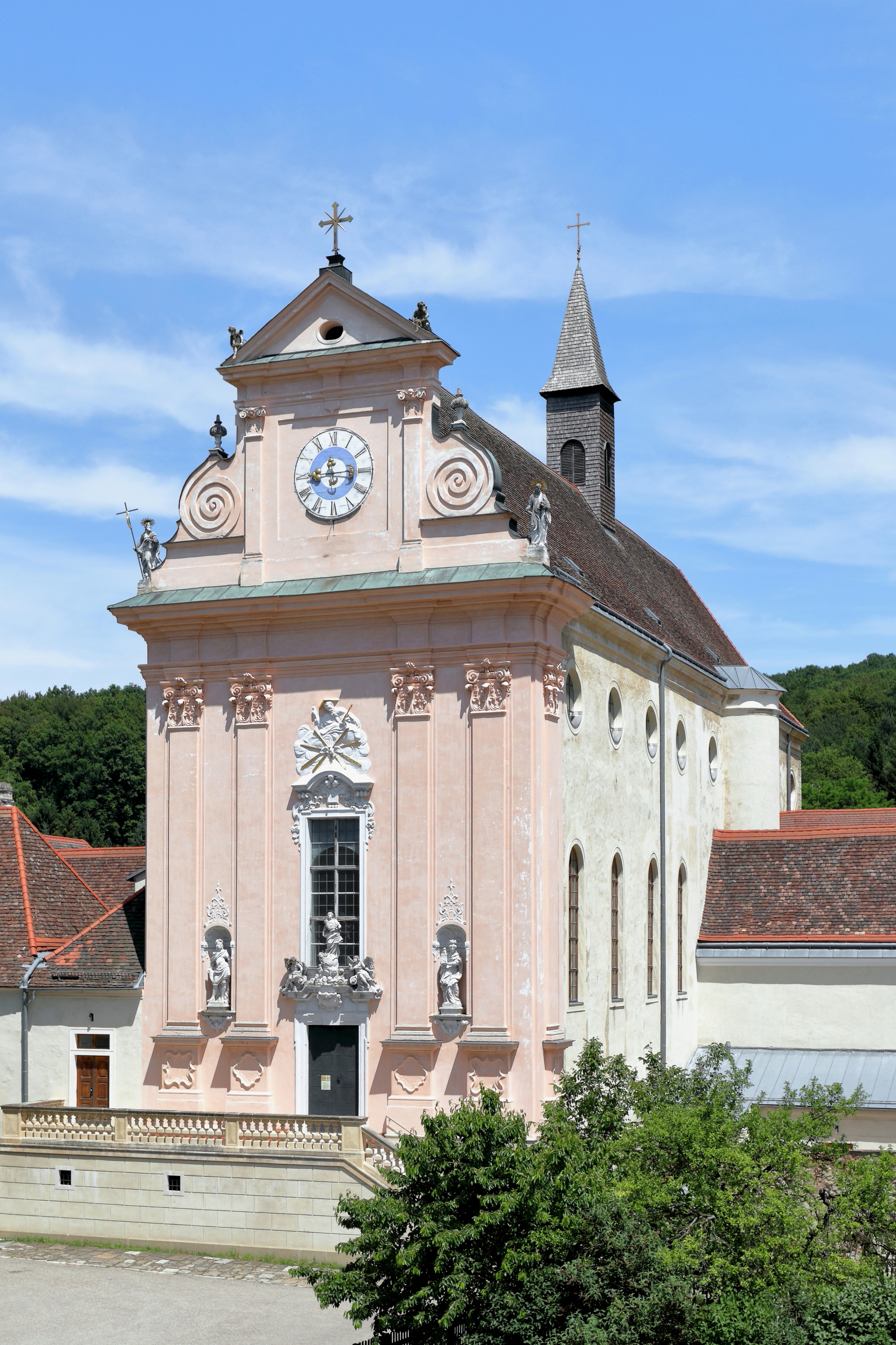
Carthusian church

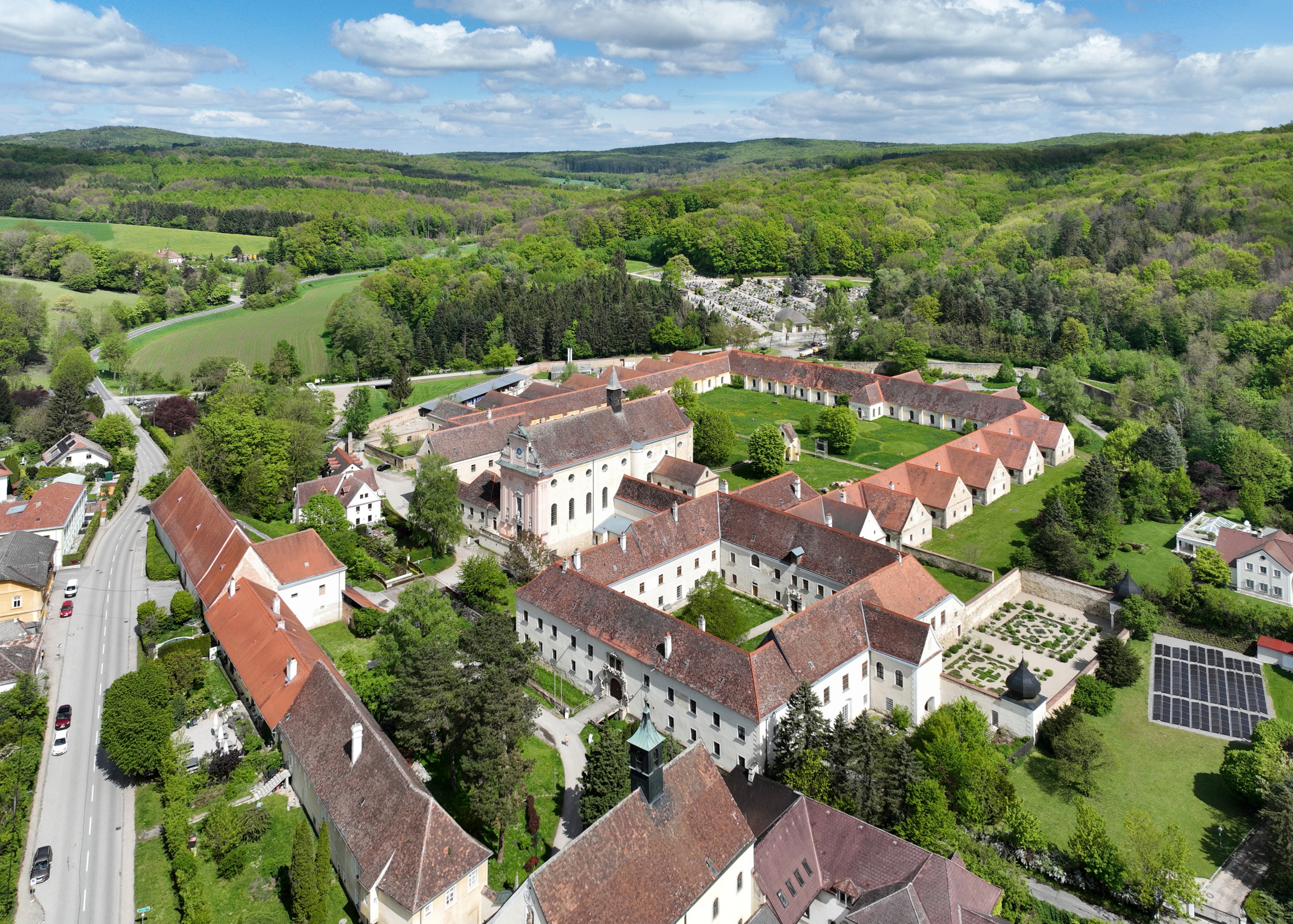
Aerial view of the Mauerbach Charterhouse

Mauerbach Charterhouse (German: Kartause Mauerbach), in Mauerbach on the outskirts of Vienna, Austria, is a former Carthusian monastery, or charterhouse. Founded in 1314 and rebuilt in the 17th and 18th centuries, the Baroque monastic complex is one of the most important structures of its kind in Austria. Since 1984 the former charterhouse has been undergoing restoration by the Austrian Federal Monuments Office ("Österreichischer Bundesdenkmalamt" or BDA), which has its workshops there.

== History ==
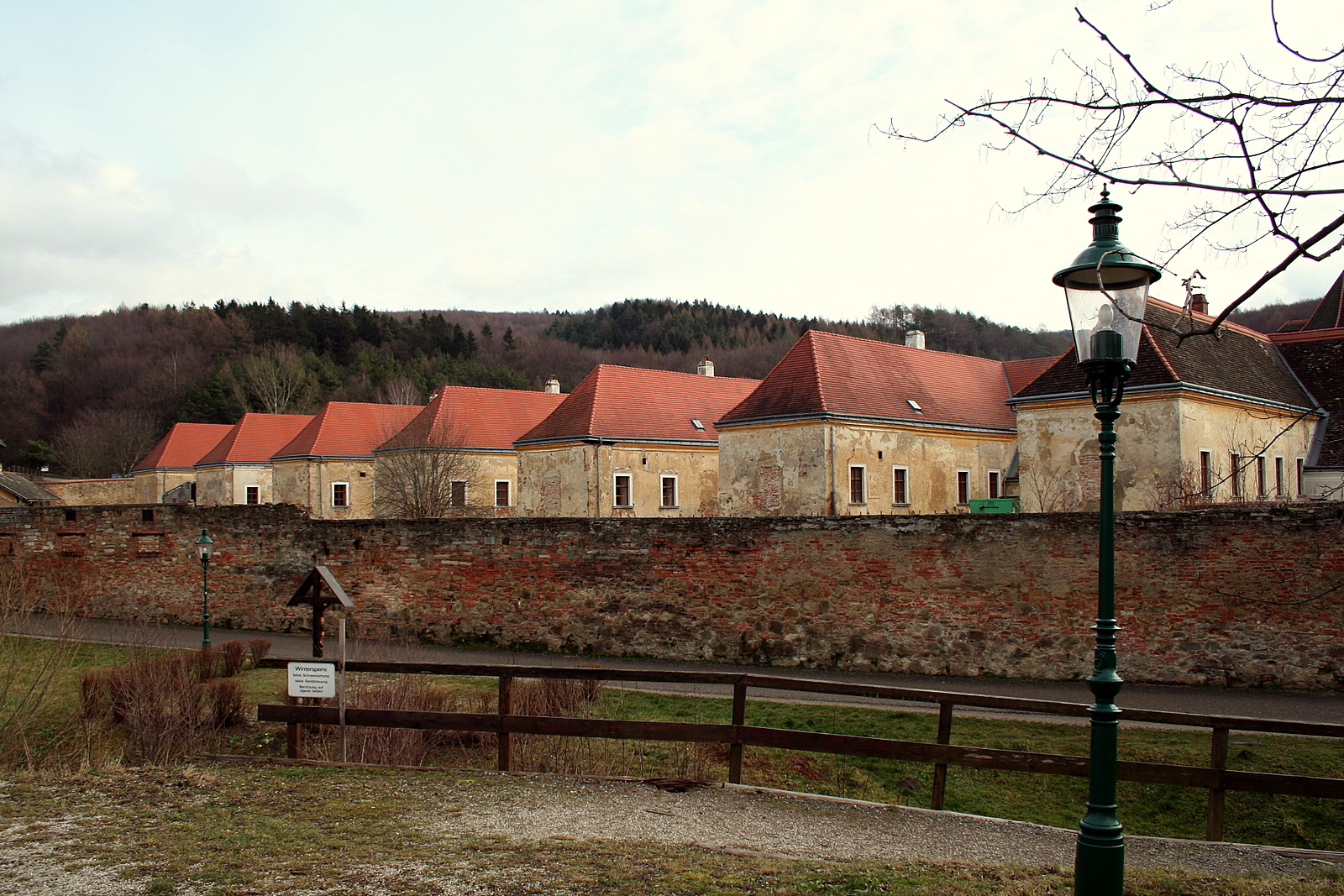
Monks' cells

Mauerbach Charterhouse was founded in 1314 by the Austrian duke Frederick the Fair, who was later buried here. The new foundation was settled by 12 monks under Prior Gottfried descending from Seiz (Žiče) in Styria and was consecrated in 1316. In 1342 the Prague Charterhouse (at Smíchov), destroyed in the Hussite Wars, was settled by monks who probably came from Mauerbach.

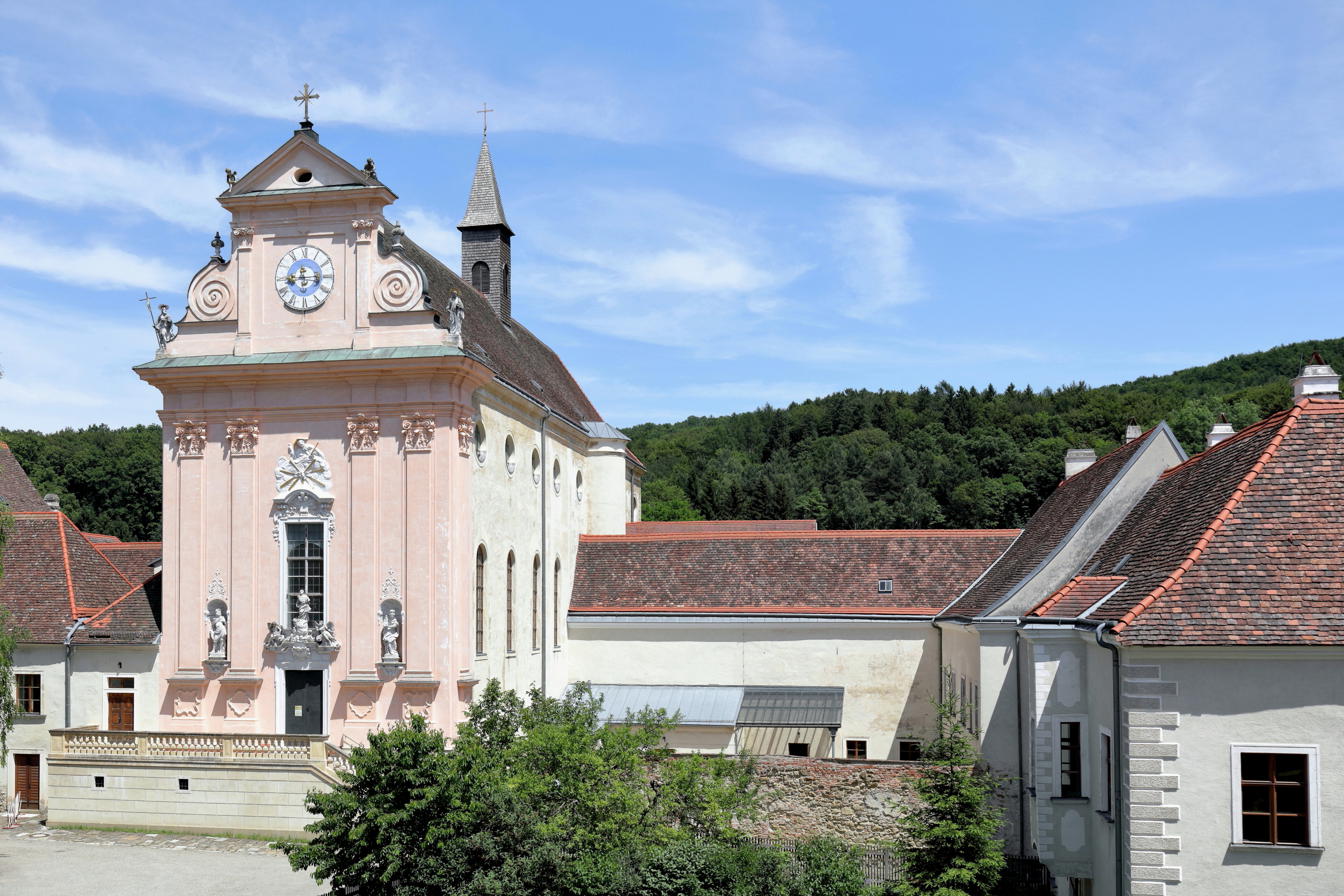
Mauerbach - Kartause

The monastery was plundered and set on fire, and some of the monks were massacred, by Ottoman troops during the 1529 Siege of Vienna, and suffered further serious structural damage by the 1590 Neulengbach earthquake. Under Abbot Georg Fasel (1616–1631) an intensive rebuilding programme began, finishing in 1660, during which the great majority of the present-day buildings were constructed. The chronicle of the charterhouse written by Abbot Leopold Brenner was available from as early as 1669, but was not printed until 1725. Brenner had lived here from 1641 and made his profession in 1650, and was thus an eyewitness of the building of the early Baroque monastery. In 1683 renewed Turkish assaults during the Battle of Vienna caused more destruction, launching a further programme of repairs and refurbishments which finished only in 1750.

== Dissolution ==
In 1782 the monastery was dissolved as "non-productive" by Emperor Joseph II during his rationalist reforms and from 1786 the premises were used for the care of the old and incurably ill of the city of Vienna. Many structural alterations were carried out to adapt the buildings to their new function.

In 1944-45 the former monastery was put to use as an emergency hospital. Between 1945 and 1961 the charterhouse was used to house the homeless. During this period the structure was badly neglected, and allowed to fall derelict from exposure to the elements. In 1961 it was acquired by the Austrian federal government and was eventually taken over in 1979 by the Bundesbaudirektion ("Federal Buildings Directorate"). Since 1984 the complex has housed the workshops of the Bundesdenkmalamt (Monuments Office).

The buildings were also used for decades as a store for works of art that had been looted by the Nazis and classified by the Austrian State as "ownerless" ("herrenloses Kunstgut").

== Restoration ==
In 1984 the Austrian Federal Monuments Office ("Österreichischer Bundesdenkmalamt") began the painstaking process of repair and restoration. The department's restoration workshops are now also located here.

== Gallery ==
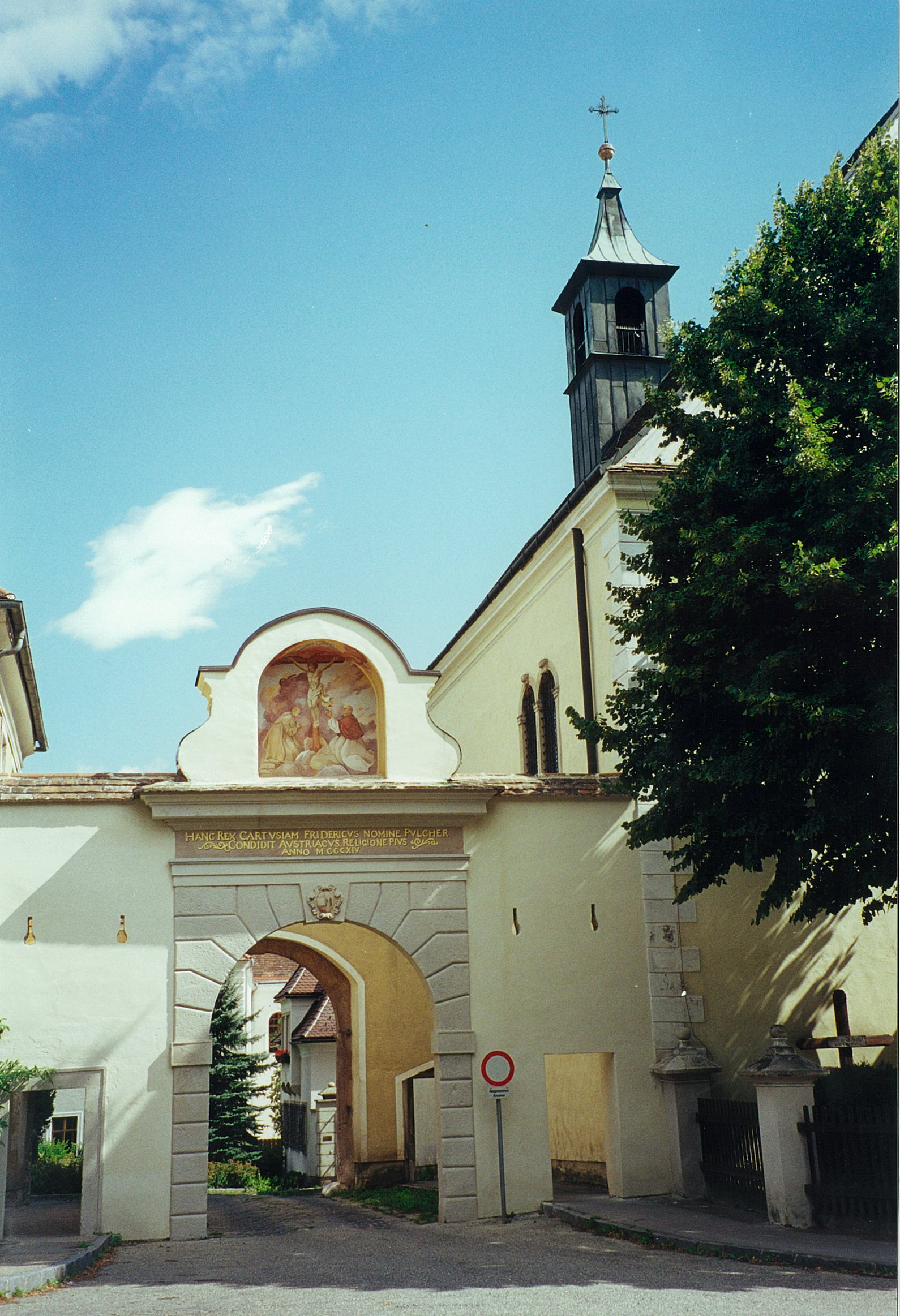
Porta Prima

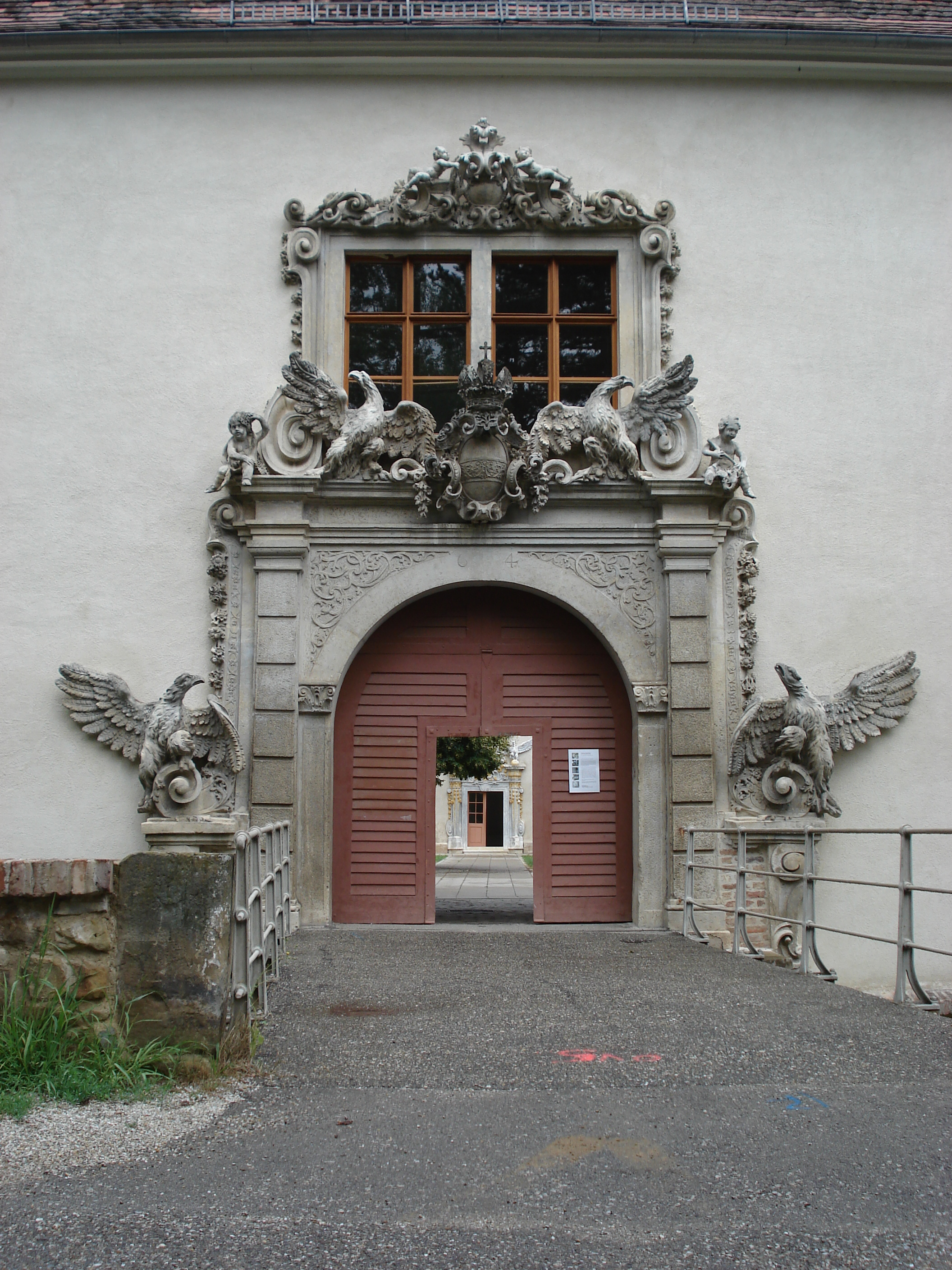
Eagle's Gate

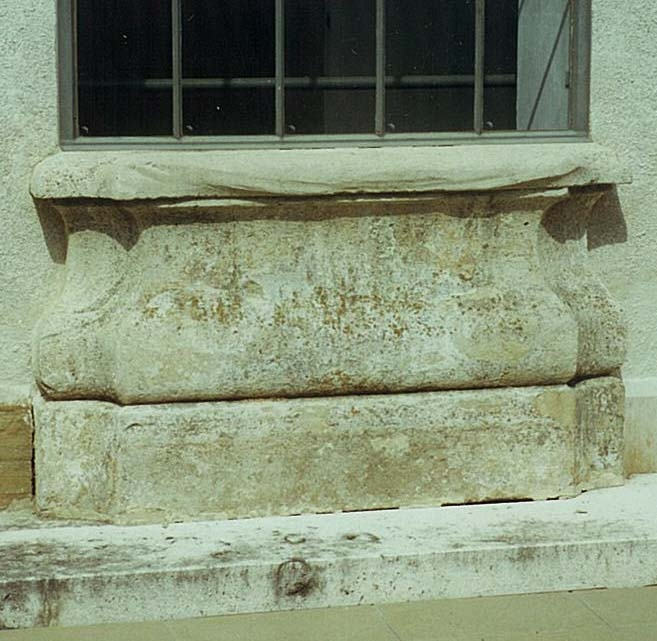
Courtyard fountain

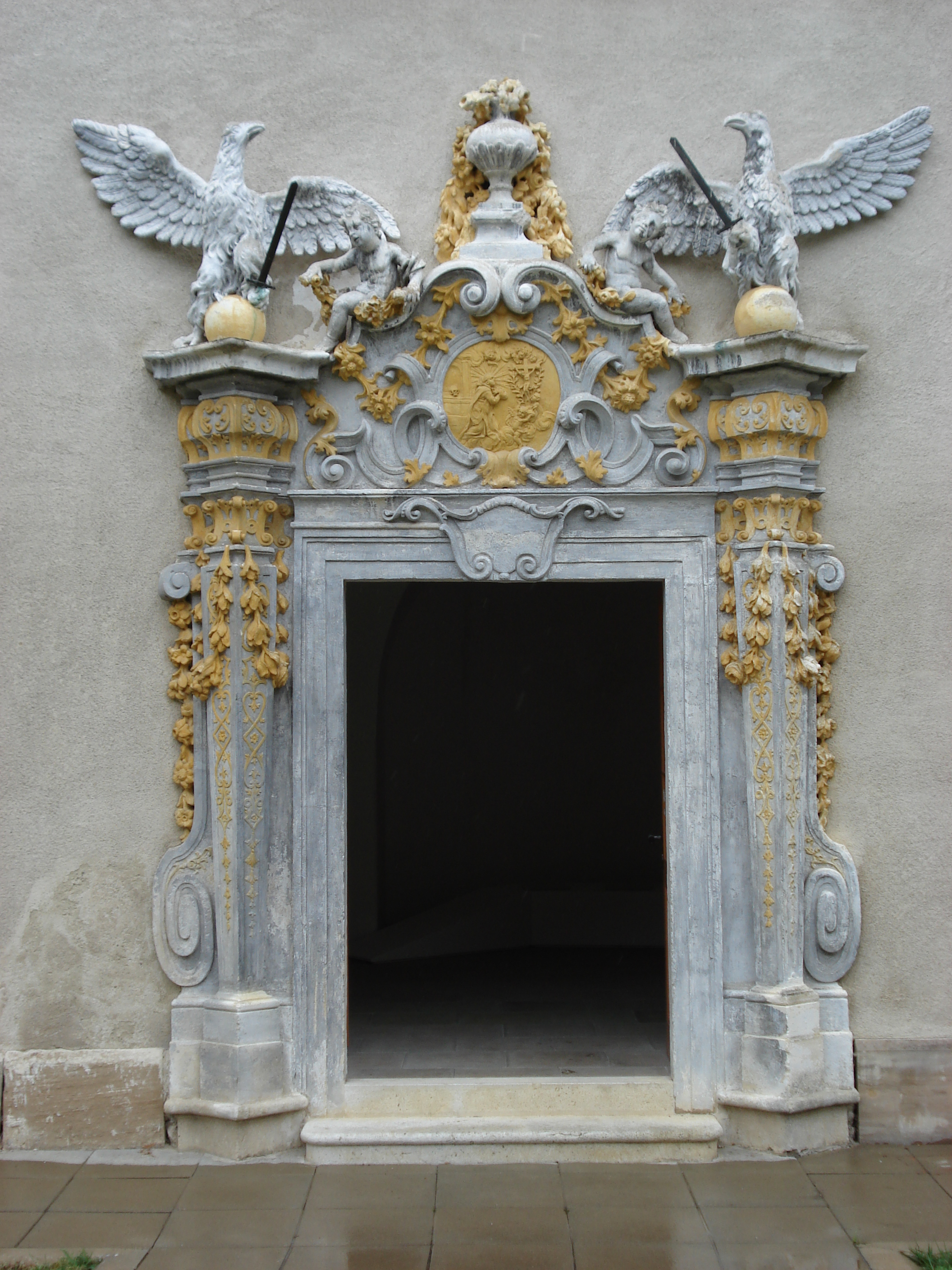
Emperor's Small Gate

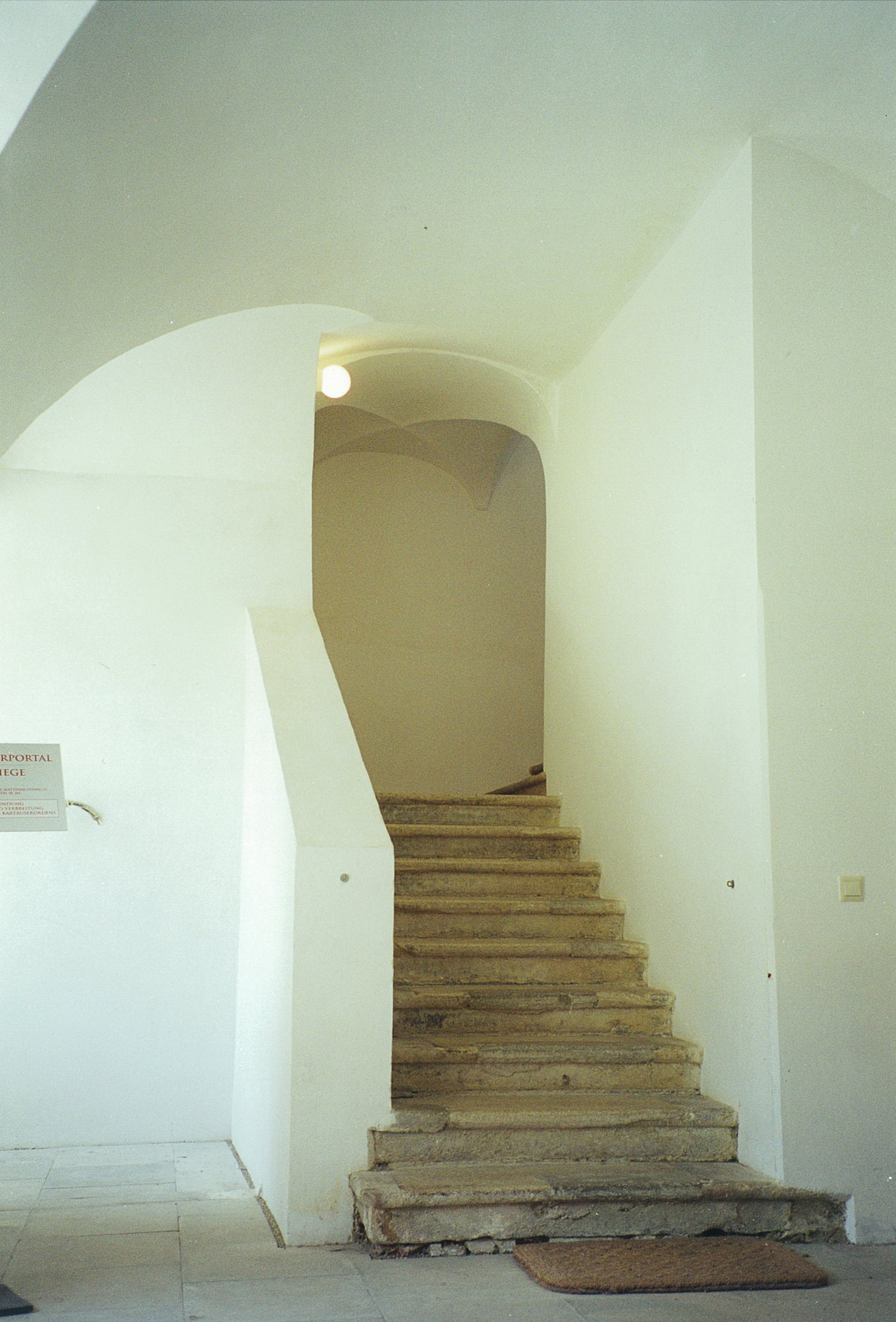
Antechamber

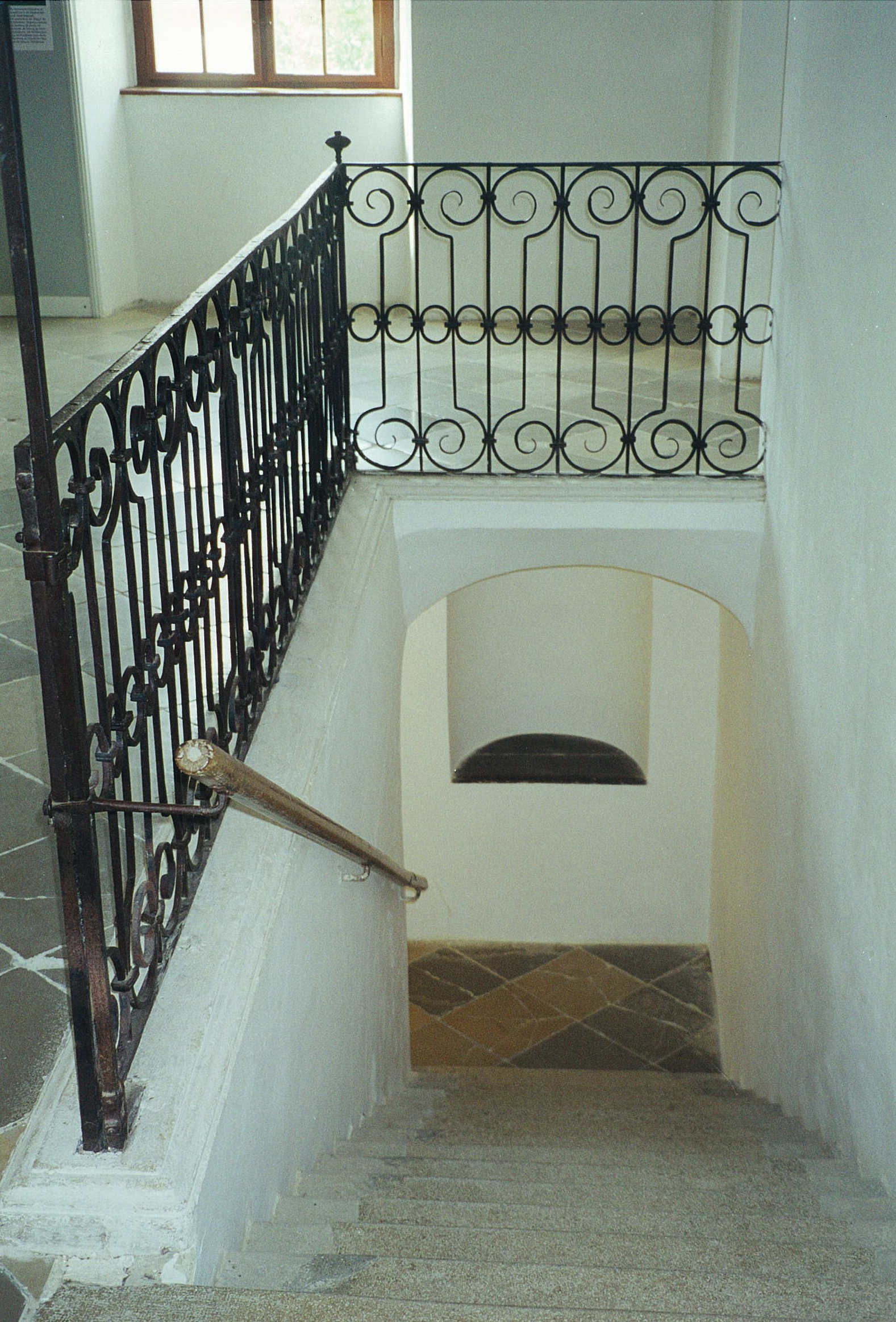
Staircase

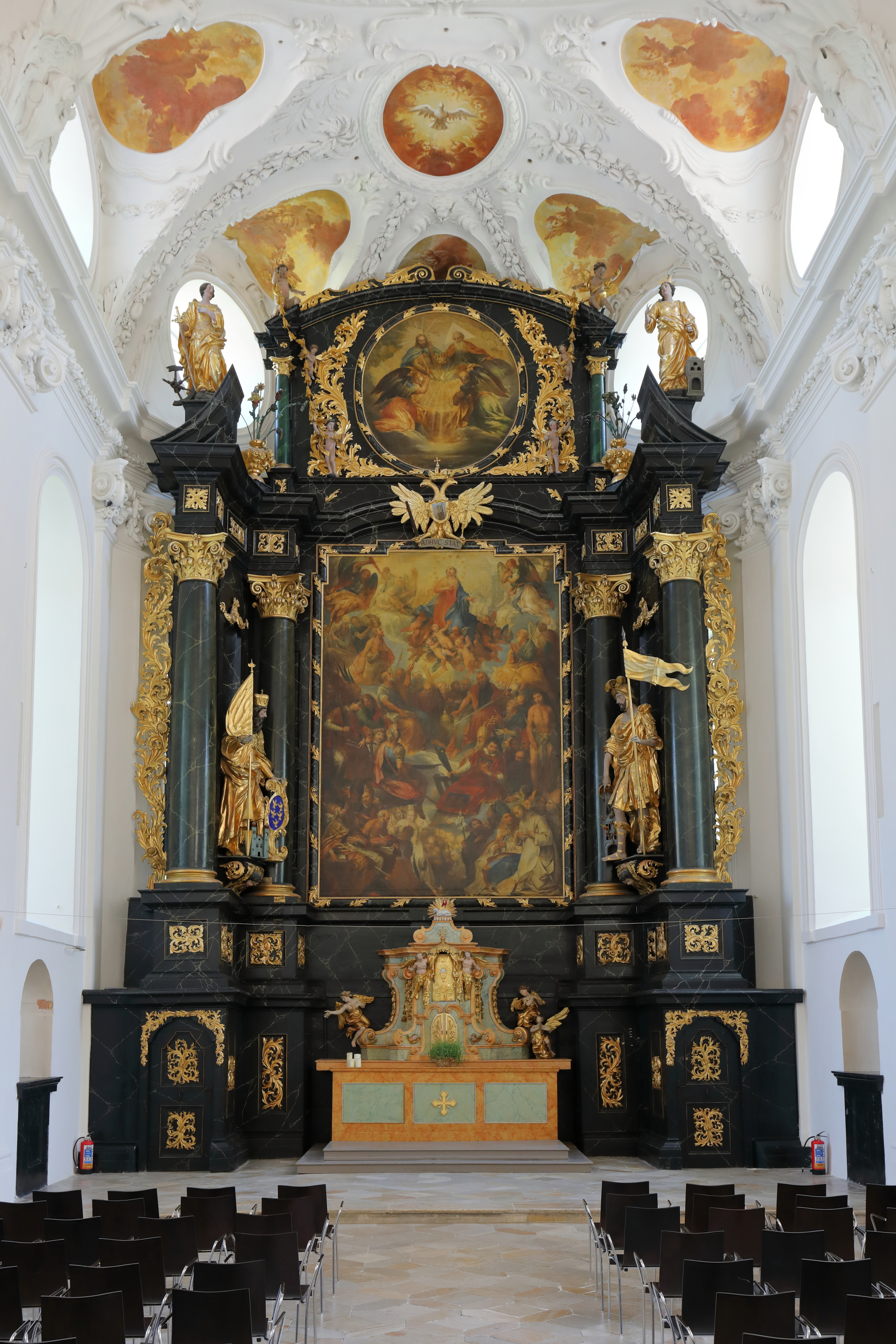
High altar

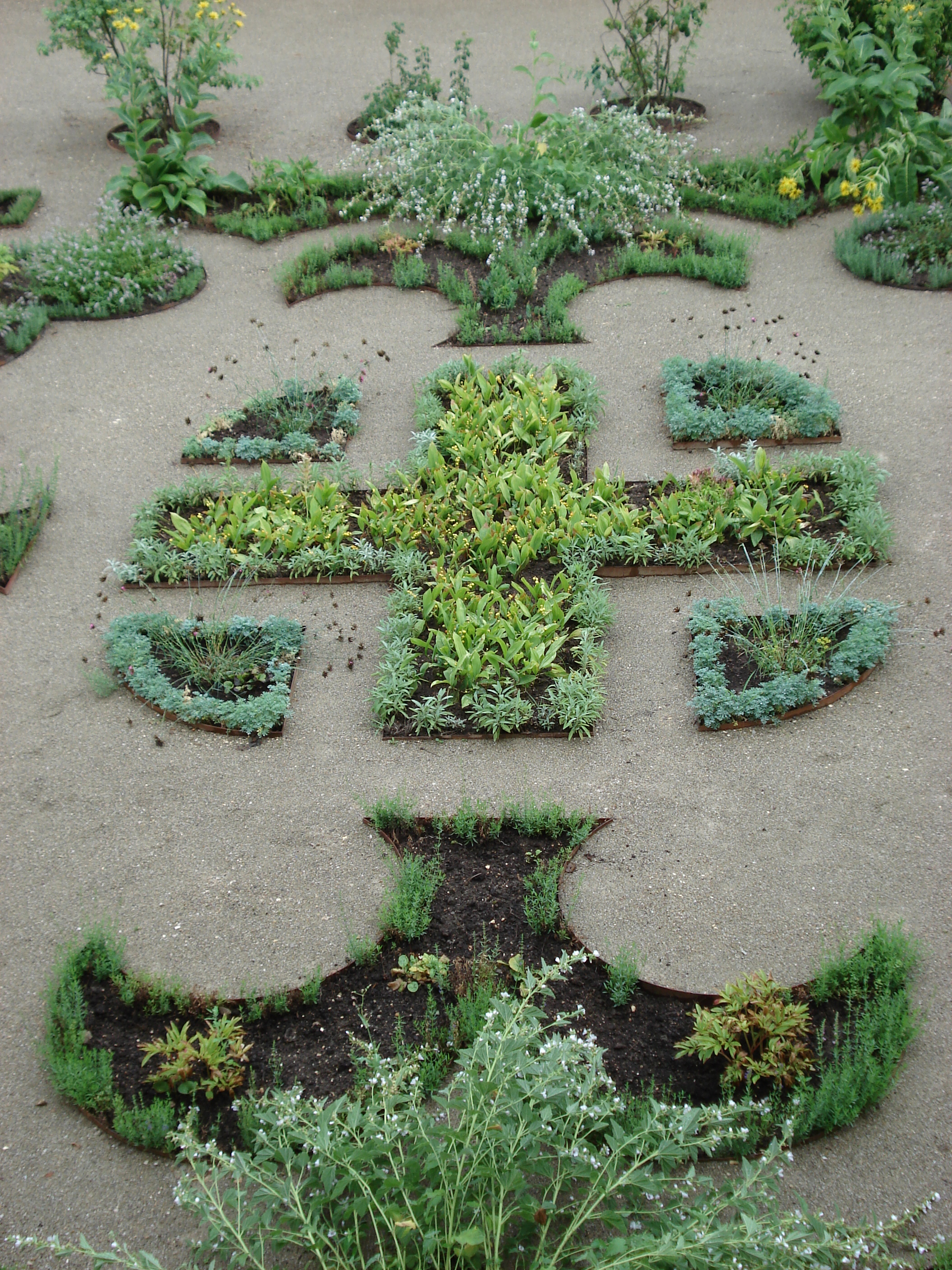
Christ's Garden

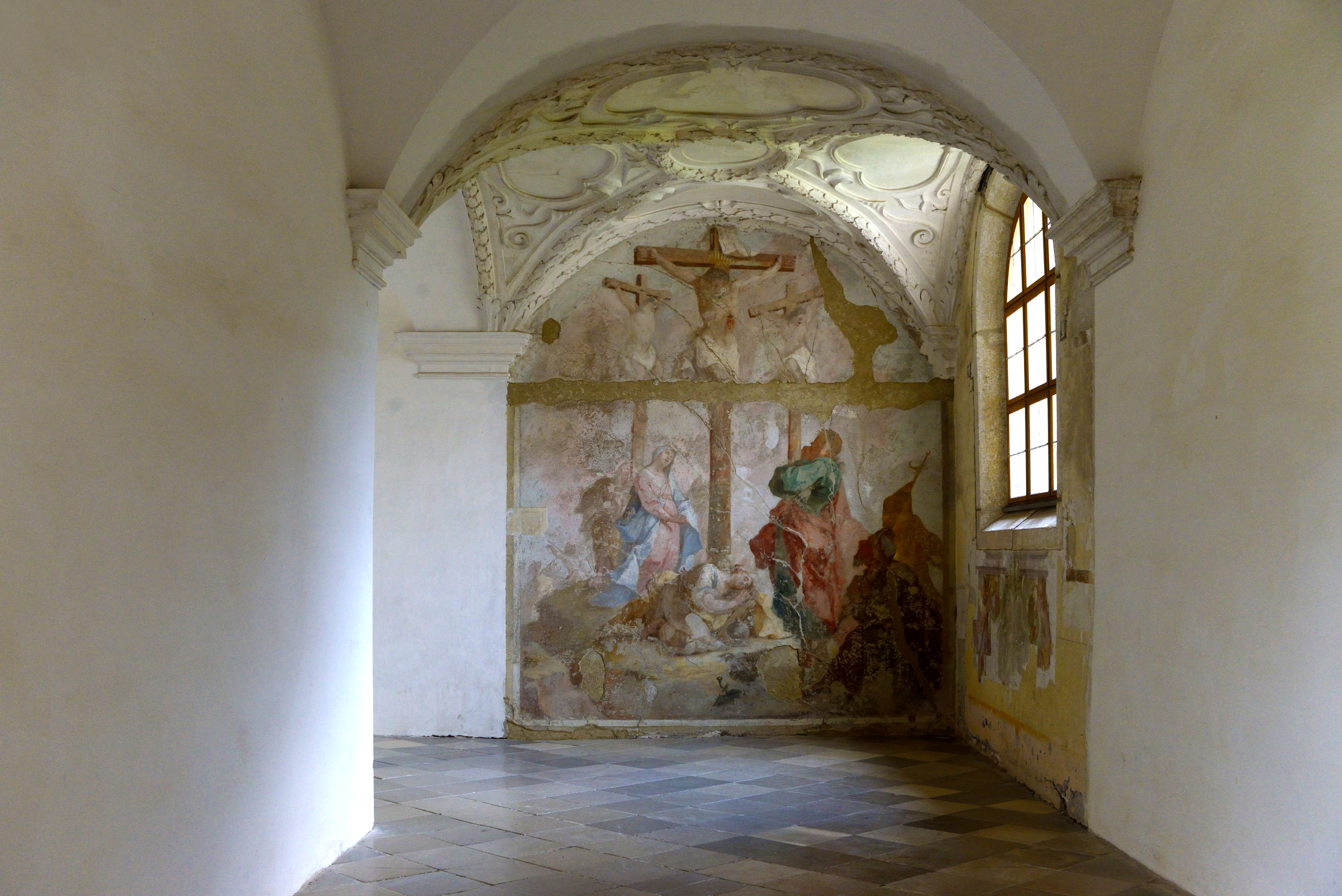
Mural Painting in the large cloister

== Sources ==
- Fahringer, Karl (1994): Eine so gute Gelegenheit. Die Aufhebung der Kartause Mauerbach. Ein "Tagebuch". Mauerbacher Beiträge Nr. 3/4. Mauerbach 1994
- Fahringer, Karl (2007): Alten und Elenden ihr trauriges Daseyn etwas milder zu machen. Das Schicksal der ehemaligen Kartause Mauerbach (1782 - 2007). Geschichte und Geschichten. Mauerbacher Beiträge Nr. 13–15. Mauerbach 2007.
