= Plešivec (mountain) =

Mountain in the Czech Republic

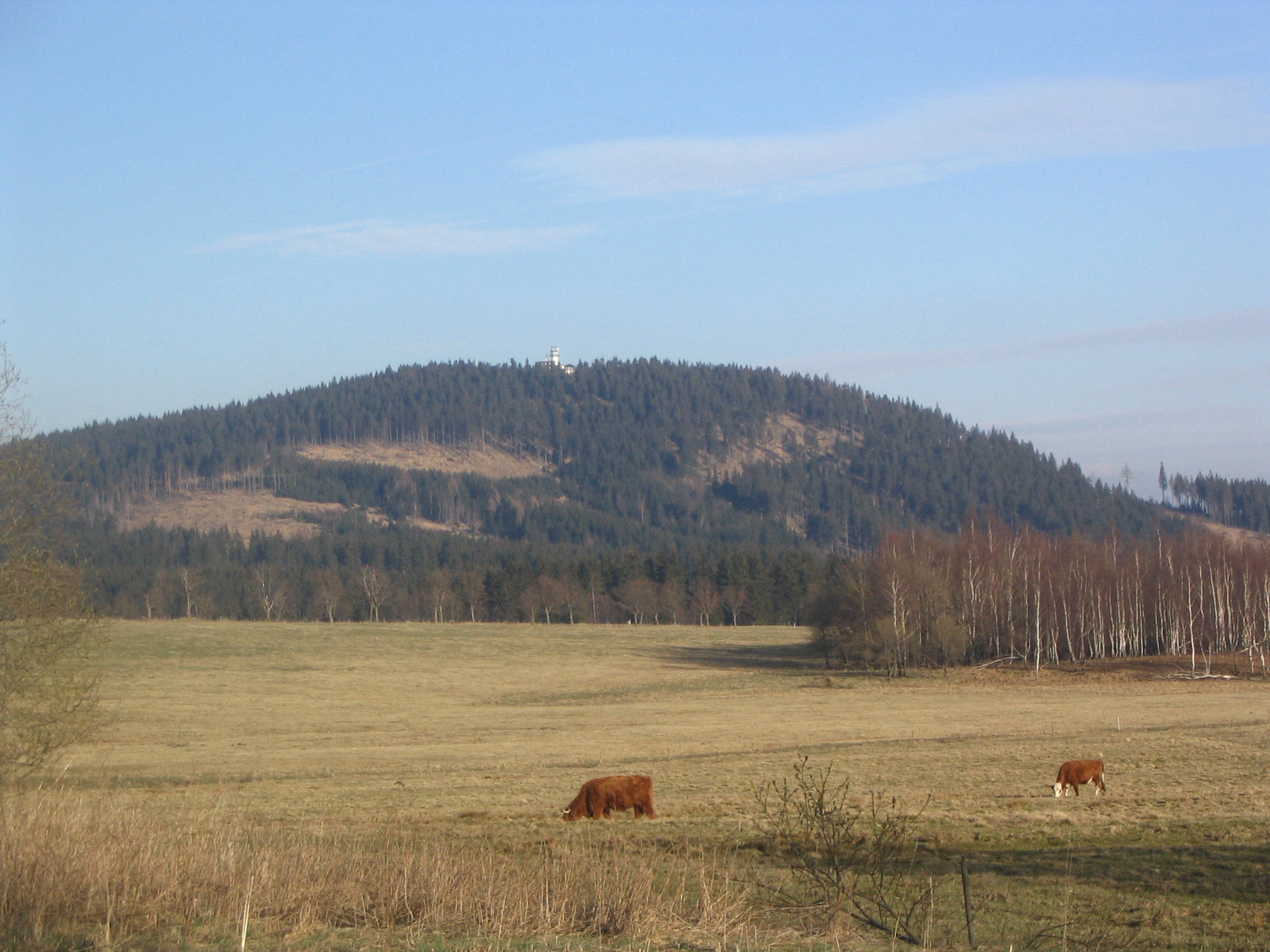
- View of Plešivec from Abertamy

Highest point
- Elevation: 1,028 m (3,373 ft)
- Coordinates: 50°21′22″N 12°50′23″E

Geography
- Location within Czech Republic
- Location: Czech Republic
- Parent range: Ore Mountains

Geology
- Mountain type: Basalt

Climbing
- Access: 1895 by the Abertham Friends of Nature

The Plešivec (German: Pleßberg) is a mountain in the Ore Mountains in the Czech Republic. It has an elevation of 1,028 metres (3,373 ft). The top of the mountain is located in the territory of Abertamy.

== Location ==
The Plešivec lies southeast of Abertamy at the most striking escarpment of the Ore Mountains where it drops into the valley of the river Ohře. West of the mountain lies the valley of the Bystřice river (a tributary of the Ohře).
