= Abertamy =

Town in the Czech Republic

- Town
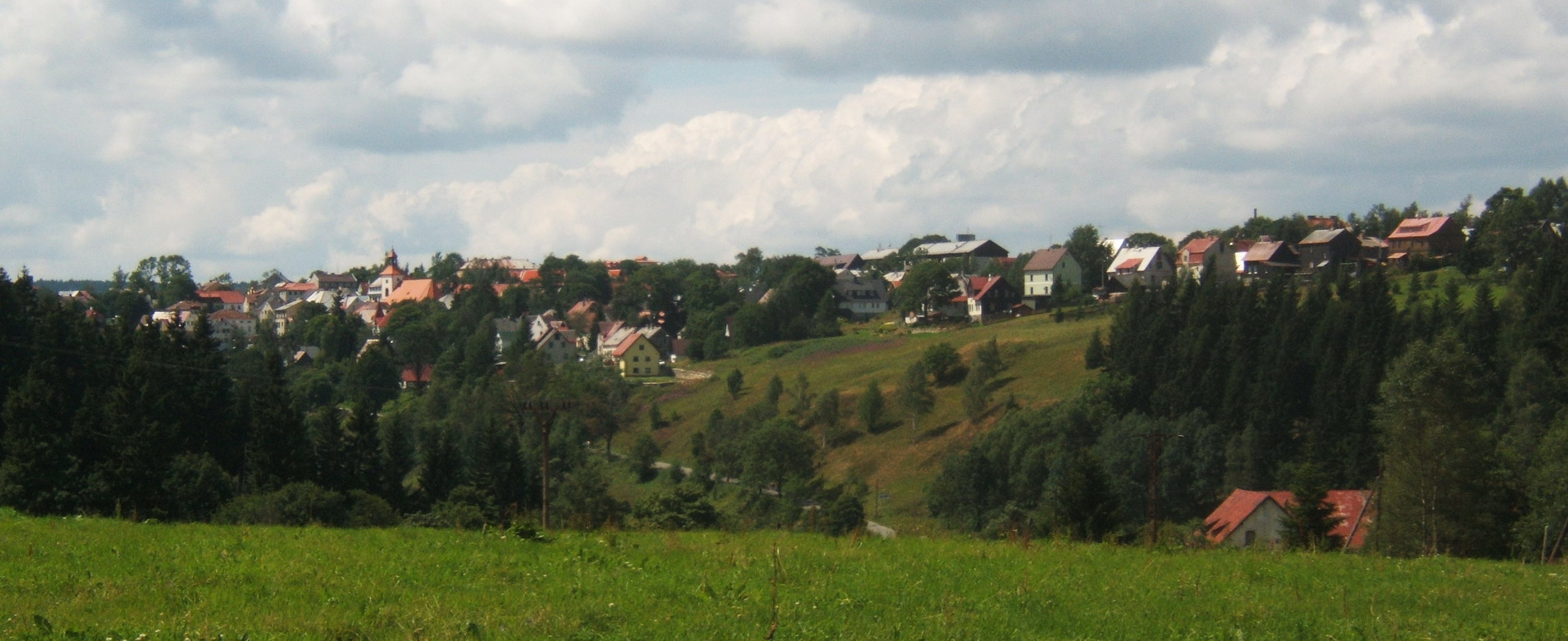
- View of Abertamy from a road to Plešivec

- Flag Coat of arms

- Location in the Czech Republic
- Coordinates: 50°22′8″N 12°49′6″E
- Country: Czech Republic
- Region: Karlovy Vary
- District: Karlovy Vary
- First mentioned: 1529

Government
  - Mayor: Renata Mrňková

Area
  - Total: 8.70 km^{2} (3.36 sq mi)
- Elevation: 840 m (2,760 ft)

Population (2026-01-01)
  - Total: 817
  - Density: 93.9/km^{2} (243/sq mi)
- Time zone: UTC+1 (CET)
  - Summer (DST): UTC+2 (CEST)
- Postal code: 362 35
- Website: www.mesto-abertamy.cz

UNESCO World Heritage Site
- Part of: Erzgebirge/Krušnohoří Mining Region
- Criteria: Cultural: (ii)(iii)(iv)
- Reference: 1478-019
- Inscription: 2019 (43rd Session)

Abertamy (Czech pronunciation: [ˈabɛrtamɪ]; German: Abertham) is a town in Karlovy Vary District in the Karlovy Vary Region of the Czech Republic. It has about 800 inhabitants. The town is located on the Bystřice River in the Ore Mountains and is known as a winter sports centre.

Abertamy was founded in the 16th century. The town is historically associated with silver and tin mining and is located in the Ore Mountain Mining Region, which is a UNESCO World Heritage Site. The most valuable monument in Abertamy is Mauritius Mine, protected as a national cultural monument.

== Administrative division ==
Abertamy consists of two municipal parts (in brackets population according to the 2021 census):

- Abertamy (759)
- Hřebečná (54)

== Etymology ==
The initial German name of the settlement was Abertham and the Czech name was created by transcription of the German name. The name also appeared as Aberdam in the oldest preserved document. There are three theories about the meaning of the name. According to all theories, the second part of the name -tham means 'dam' (in modern German Damm). The first part of the name may come from the Middle High German âber ('bare', 'open', here referring to the landscape), from the German word Eber ('wild boar'), or from the old German word aber ('rear', 'side').

== Geography ==
Abertamy is located about 15 km (9 mi) north of Karlovy Vary. It lies in the Ore Mountains. The highest point is one of the highest mountains of this mountain range, Plešivec with an altitude of 1,028 metres (3,373 ft). The town is situated on the right bank of the Bystřice River.

== History ==
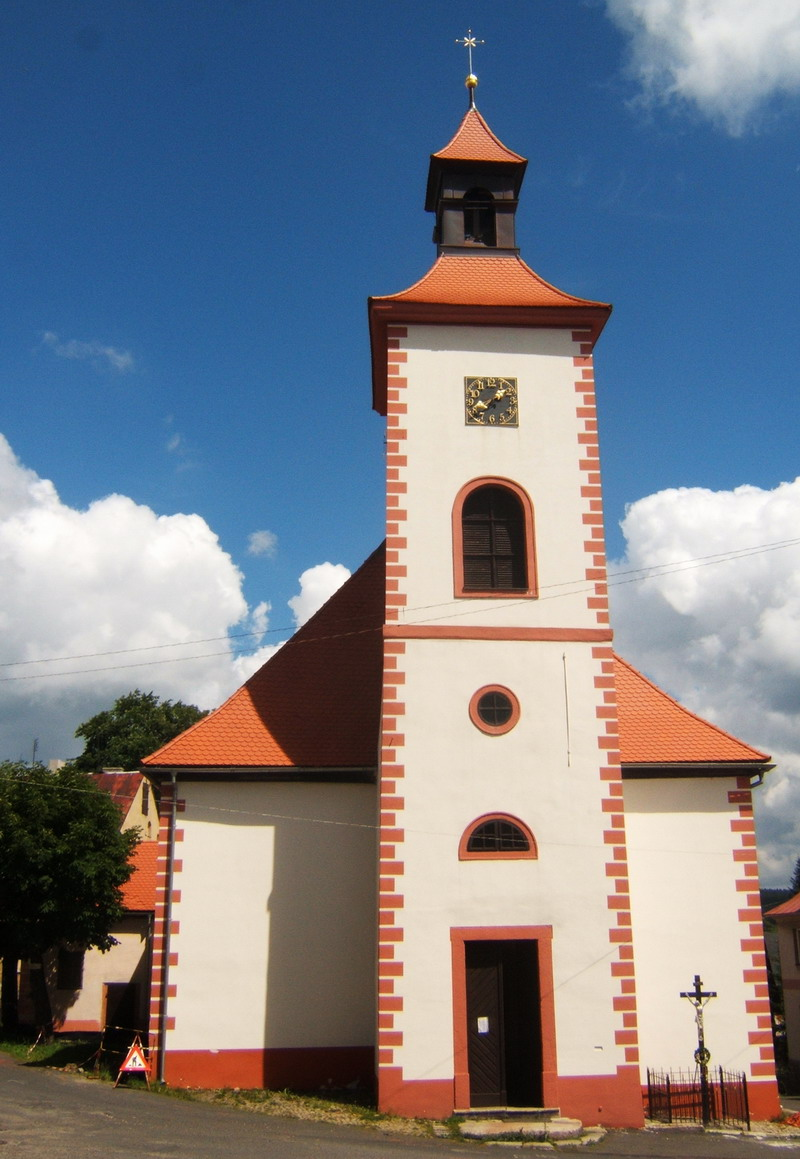
Church of Fourteen Holy Helpers

Miners started to settle in the area between 1525 and 1529. The first written mention of Abertamy is from 1529. In 1579, Abertamy was promoted to royal mining town by Emperor Rudolf II. On 15 September 1590, a strong earthquake was recorded here. Silver mining gradually declined, especially during the Thirty Years' War, when it ended in 1622. Only the mining of tin continued. Abertamy lost its town rights, and the area was forcibly re-Catholicised after the war. In the mid-19th century manufacturing of gloves began and expanded in the 20th century. In 1876, Abertamy obtained the town status again.

In the 1930s, 98% of the population of Abertamy were ethnic Germans. The town was annexed by Nazi Germany in 1938 and in 1938–1945 it was administered as part of the Reichsgau Sudetenland. In 1945, many German speaking people were expelled and local industry was nationalised. However roughly 150,000 of three million Sudeten Germans in the surrounding region were not expelled due to their indispensable mining and technical skills. A large German-speaking minority remained here until the 2000s, but it is gradually disappearing.

Intensive mining of uranium ore had started in the area after World War II. There used to be two shafts in Abertamy. In 1998, the factory producing gloves closed down.

== Demographics ==
Historical population

Year	Pop.	±%
1869	3,310	—
1880	3,605	+8.9%
1890	3,644	+1.1%
1900	4,010	+10.0%
1910	4,293	+7.1%

Year	Pop.	±%
1921	3,512	−18.2%
1930	3,824	+8.9%
1950	2,261	−40.9%
1961	1,715	−24.1%
1970	1,145	−33.2%

Year	Pop.	±%
1980	1,156	+1.0%
1991	1,052	−9.0%
2001	1,197	+13.8%
2011	1,213	+1.3%
2021	813	−33.0%

Source: Censuses

== Transport ==
There are no railways or major roads passing through the municipal territory.

== Sport ==
The area is actively used for winter and summer sports. There is a large modern ski resort on the slopes of the mountain Plešivec. It has eight downhill courses and nine ski lifts.

== Sights ==
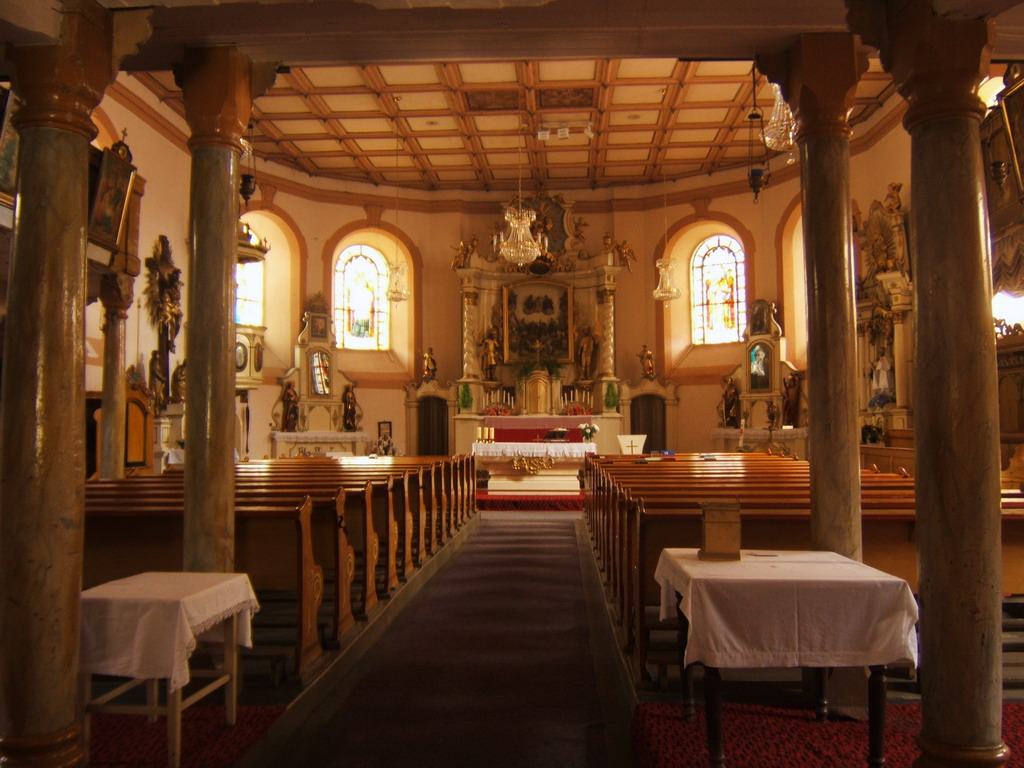
Interiors of the church

Abertamy lies in the mining cultural landscape Abertamy – Boží Dar – Horní Blatná, which was designated a UNESCO World Heritage Site in 2019 as a part of the transnational Ore Mountain Mining Region.

The most valuable monument in Abertamy is Mauritius Mine, which is remains of the largest tin mine in the Ore Mountains. It was in operation from the 16th century to the 1940s. Today it is protected as a national cultural monument and is open to the public. Červená jáma, which is the largest depression after mining activities in the country, is also a part of the protected area of the mine.

The Church of Fourteen Holy Helpers was built in the late Gothic style in 1534. In 1735–1738, it was rebuilt in the Baroque style. It was modified to its present form in the first half of the 19th century.

== Notable people ==
- Horst Siegl (born 1969), footballer

== Gallery ==
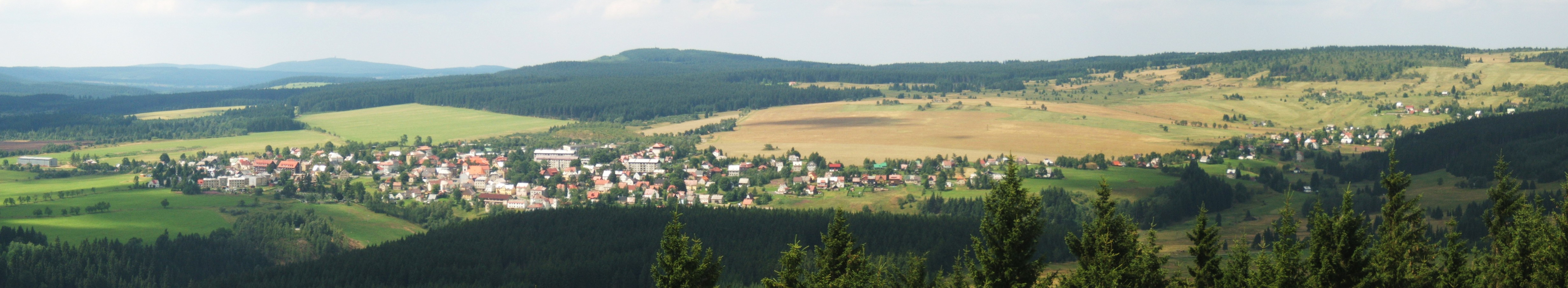
View of Abertamy from Plešivec
