= Loučná =

Loučná may refer to places in the Czech Republic:

- Loučná (river), a tributary of the Elbe
- Loučná, a town part of Hrádek nad Nisou in the Liberec Region
- Loučná, a village and part of Lom (Most District) in the Ústí nad Labem Region
- Loučná, a village and part of Višňová (Liberec District) in the Liberec Region
- Loučná nad Desnou, a municipality and village in the Olomouc Region
- Loučná nad Nisou, a village and part of Janov nad Nisou in the Liberec Region
- Loučná pod Klínovcem, a town in the Ústí nad Labem Region
