= Malé Březno =

Malé Březno may refer to places in the Ústí nad Labem Region of the Czech Republic:

- Malé Březno (Most District), a municipality and village
- Malé Březno (Ústí nad Labem District), a municipality and village
