= Antonín Kubálek =

Czech-Canadian classical pianist

Antonín Kubálek (November 8, 1935 – January 18, 2011) was a Czech-Canadian classical pianist.

== Life and career ==
Kubálek was born in Libkovice, Most District, Czechoslovakia and studied in Prague with Czech pianist František Maxián. He emigrated to Canada in 1968 and settled in Toronto. During his time in Canada, Kubálek performed in solo, chamber and orchestral concerts.

Antonin Kubálek's artistry and musicianship commanded respect and admiration from audiences and critics internationally. He received three standing ovations following his performance in the Rudolfinum at the 2002 Prague Spring Festival. In November 2002, Kubálek was recognized by the Czech Music Council with a UNESCO honorary award. His exceptionally wide repertoire contained Czech and Canadian music, including contemporary pieces; but also romantic works by Chopin, Schumann, and especially Brahms, for which he is considered to be one of the foremost performers of recent times.

A respected educator, Kubálek served on the faculties of The Royal Conservatory of Music, University of Toronto, York University, the Prague Conservatory and the Prague Academy of Performing Arts. He chaired the Fred Gaviller Memorial Foundation, a Toronto organization whose mission was to sponsor debut recitals of young artists. Kubálek also served as chair of the Advisory Committee of the Kapralova Society in Toronto and participated in the first Canadian documentary on Vítězslava Kaprálová for the CBC Radio 2 in 2001. In 2003 he established an annual festival in Zlaté Hory in the Czech Republic, The International Kubalek Piano Courses, for young pianists. Among his most important pupils of that time were Richard Pohl and Birute Bizeviciute.

Kubálek was twice nominated for the Juno Award in Canada.

== Death ==
He died in Prague after surgery for a brain tumour.

== Discography ==
Kubálek was a best-selling international recording artist, having over a dozen CDs available at the time of his death and two dozen LP titles to his credit. His award-winning CD recordings on the Dorian Recordings label won him praise in such publications as the American Record Guide, Fanfare Magazine, CD Review, and Gramophone Magazine.

Glenn Gould made a unique contribution to Kubálek's career. Gould's only foray into the role of producer was inspired by Kubálek's playing: the Second Piano Sonata by Erich Wolfgang Korngold was the result of this collaboration.
