= Klíny =

- Municipality
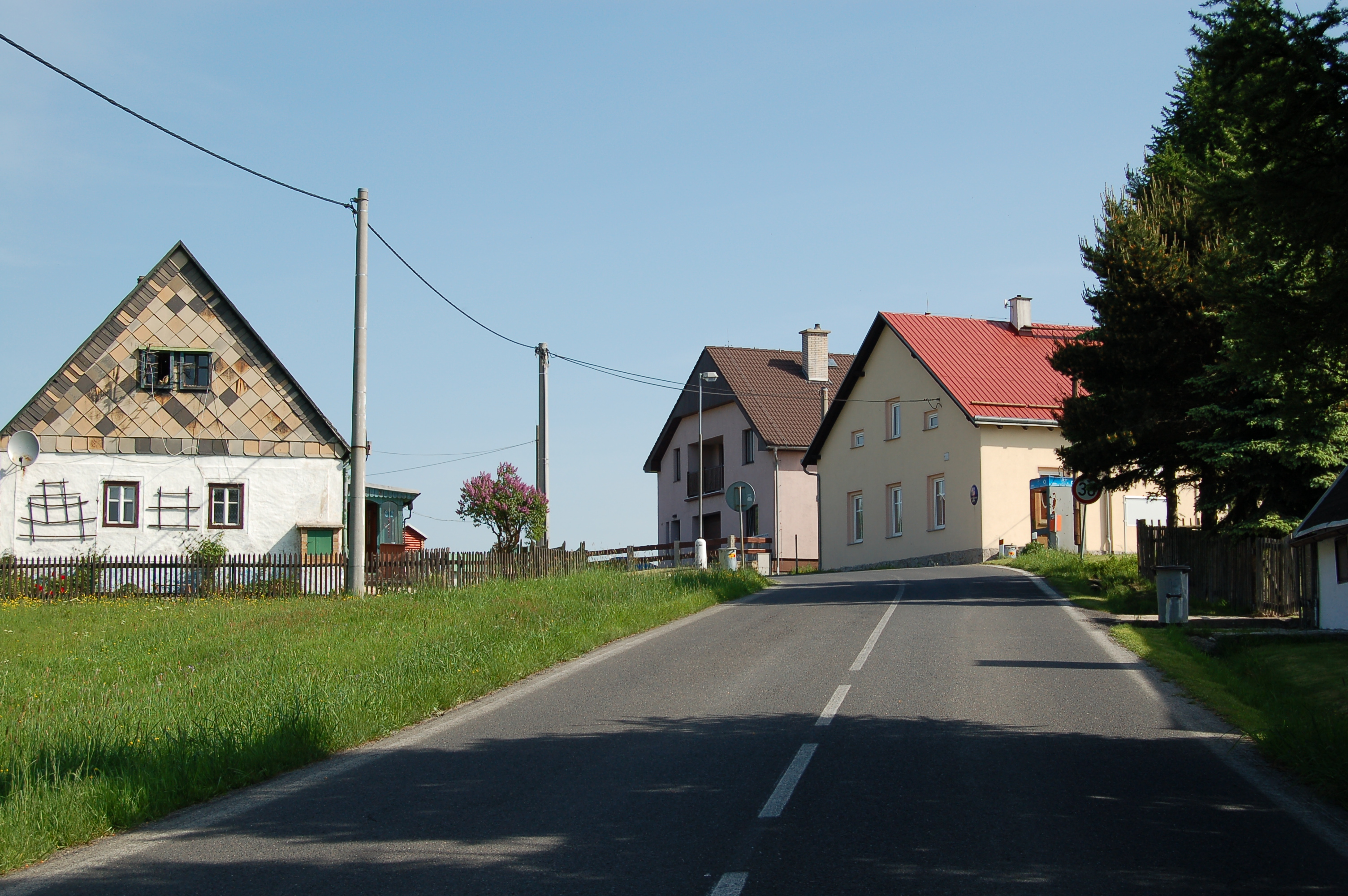
- Municipal office

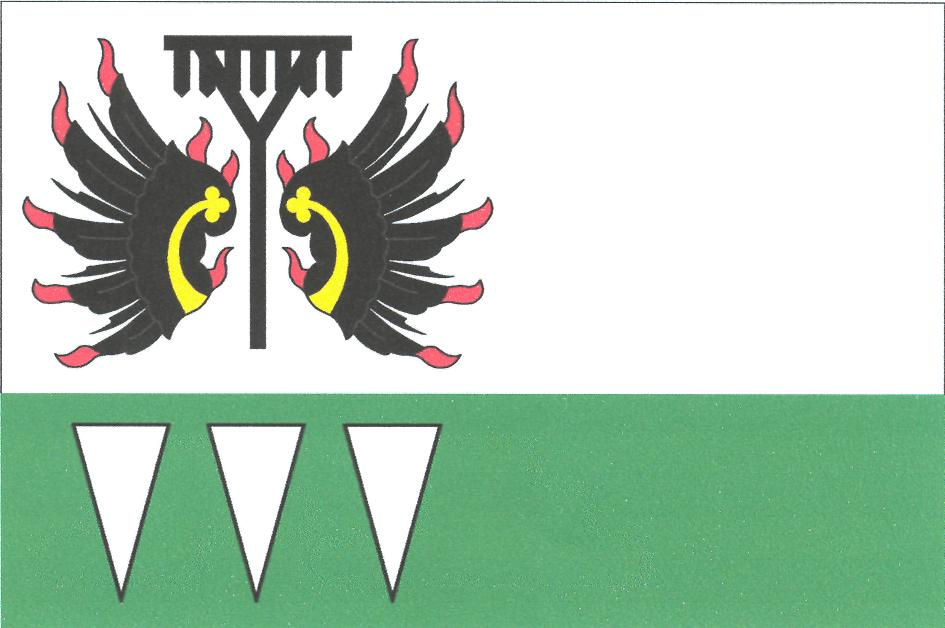
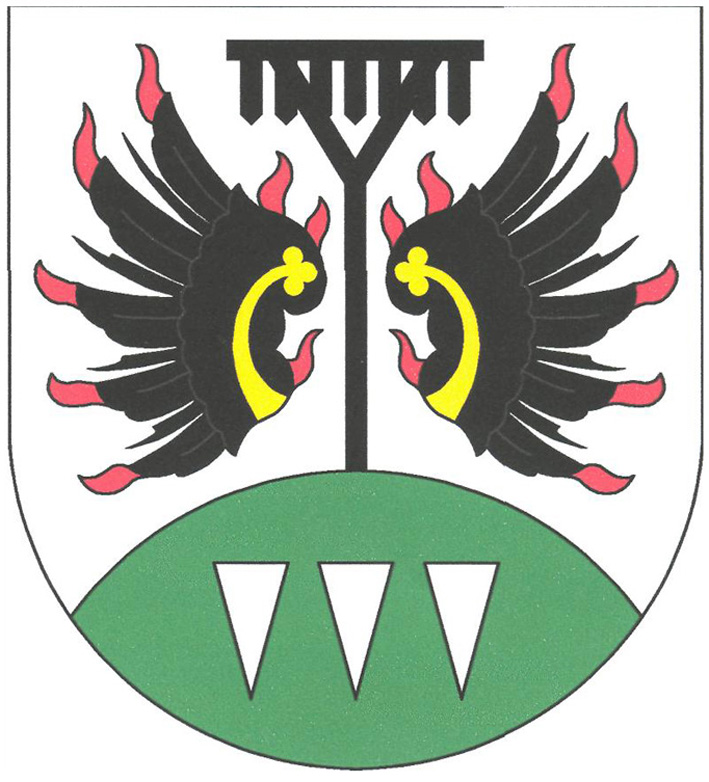
- Flag Coat of arms

- Location in the Czech Republic
- Coordinates: 50°38′18″N 13°32′54″E
- Country: Czech Republic
- Region: Ústí nad Labem
- District: Most
- First mentioned: 1355

Area
  - Total: 18.45 km^{2} (7.12 sq mi)
- Elevation: 812 m (2,664 ft)

Population (2026-01-01)
  - Total: 181
  - Density: 9.81/km^{2} (25.4/sq mi)
- Time zone: UTC+1 (CET)
  - Summer (DST): UTC+2 (CEST)
- Postal code: 436 01
- Website: www.kliny.eu

Klíny (German: Göhren) is a municipality and village in Most District in the Ústí nad Labem Region of the Czech Republic. It has about 200 inhabitants.

Klíny lies approximately 17 kilometres (11 mi) north-west of Most, 36 km (22 mi) west of Ústí nad Labem, and 88 km (55 mi) north-west of Prague.

== Administrative division ==
Klíny consists of three municipal parts (in brackets population according to the 2021 census):

- Klíny (92)
- Rašov (31)
- Sedlo (47)

== Demographics ==
Historical population
Year	Pop.	±%
1869	518	—
1880	475	−8.3%
1890	425	−10.5%
1900	420	−1.2%
1910	392	−6.7%
1921	358	−8.7%
1930	397	+10.9%
1950	89	−77.6%
1961	150	+68.5%
1970	126	−16.0%
1980	108	−14.3%
1991	74	−31.5%
2001	63	−14.9%
2011	115	+82.5%
2021	170	+47.8%
Source: Censuses
