= Polerady (Most District) =

- Municipality
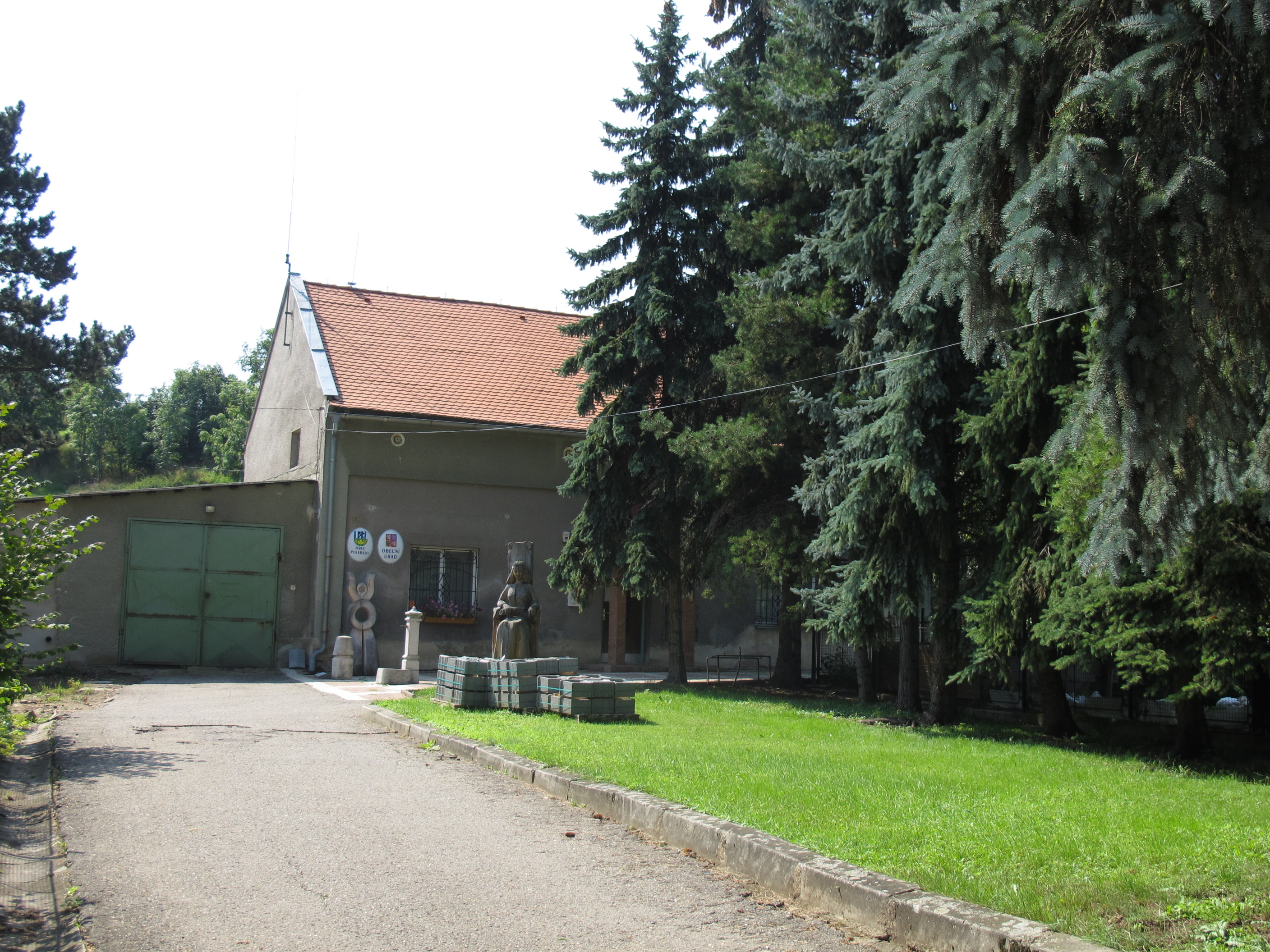
- Municipal office

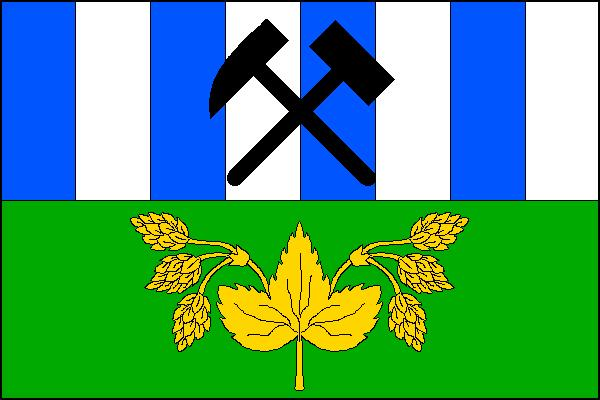
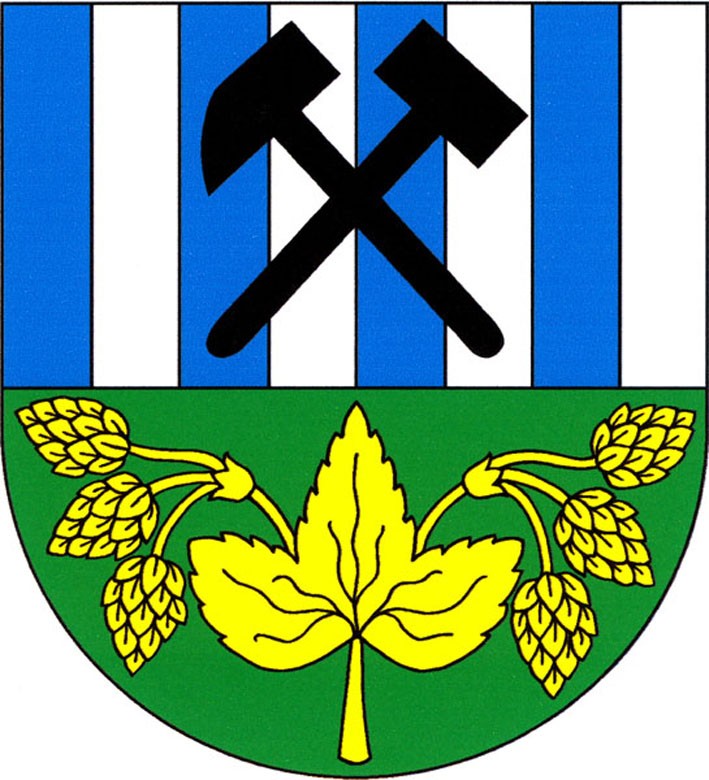
- Flag Coat of arms

- Location in the Czech Republic
- Coordinates: 50°26′40″N 13°39′10″E
- Country: Czech Republic
- Region: Ústí nad Labem
- District: Most
- First mentioned: 1250

Area
  - Total: 7.08 km^{2} (2.73 sq mi)
- Elevation: 218 m (715 ft)

Population (2026-01-01)
  - Total: 235
  - Density: 33.2/km^{2} (86.0/sq mi)
- Time zone: UTC+1 (CET)
  - Summer (DST): UTC+2 (CEST)
- Postal code: 434 01
- Website: www.polerady.cz

Polerady (German: Polerad) is a municipality and village in Most District in the Ústí nad Labem Region of the Czech Republic. It has about 200 inhabitants.

Polerady lies approximately 8 kilometres (5 mi) south of Most, 37 km (23 mi) south-west of Ústí nad Labem, and 67 km (42 mi) north-west of Prague.

== History ==
The first written mention of Polerady is from 1250.

== Demographics ==
Historical population
| Year | Pop. | ±% |
|---|---|---|
| 1869 | 308 | — |
| 1880 | 347 | +12.7% |
| 1890 | 364 | +4.9% |
| 1900 | 452 | +24.2% |
| 1910 | 483 | +6.9% |
| 1921 | 526 | +8.9% |
| 1930 | 628 | +19.4% |
| 1950 | 356 | −43.3% |
| 1961 | 333 | −6.5% |
| 1970 | 274 | −17.7% |
| 1980 | 207 | −24.5% |
| 1991 | 150 | −27.5% |
| 2001 | 215 | +43.3% |
| 2011 | 220 | +2.3% |
| 2021 | 226 | +2.7% |
Source: Censuses
