= Braňany =

- Municipality
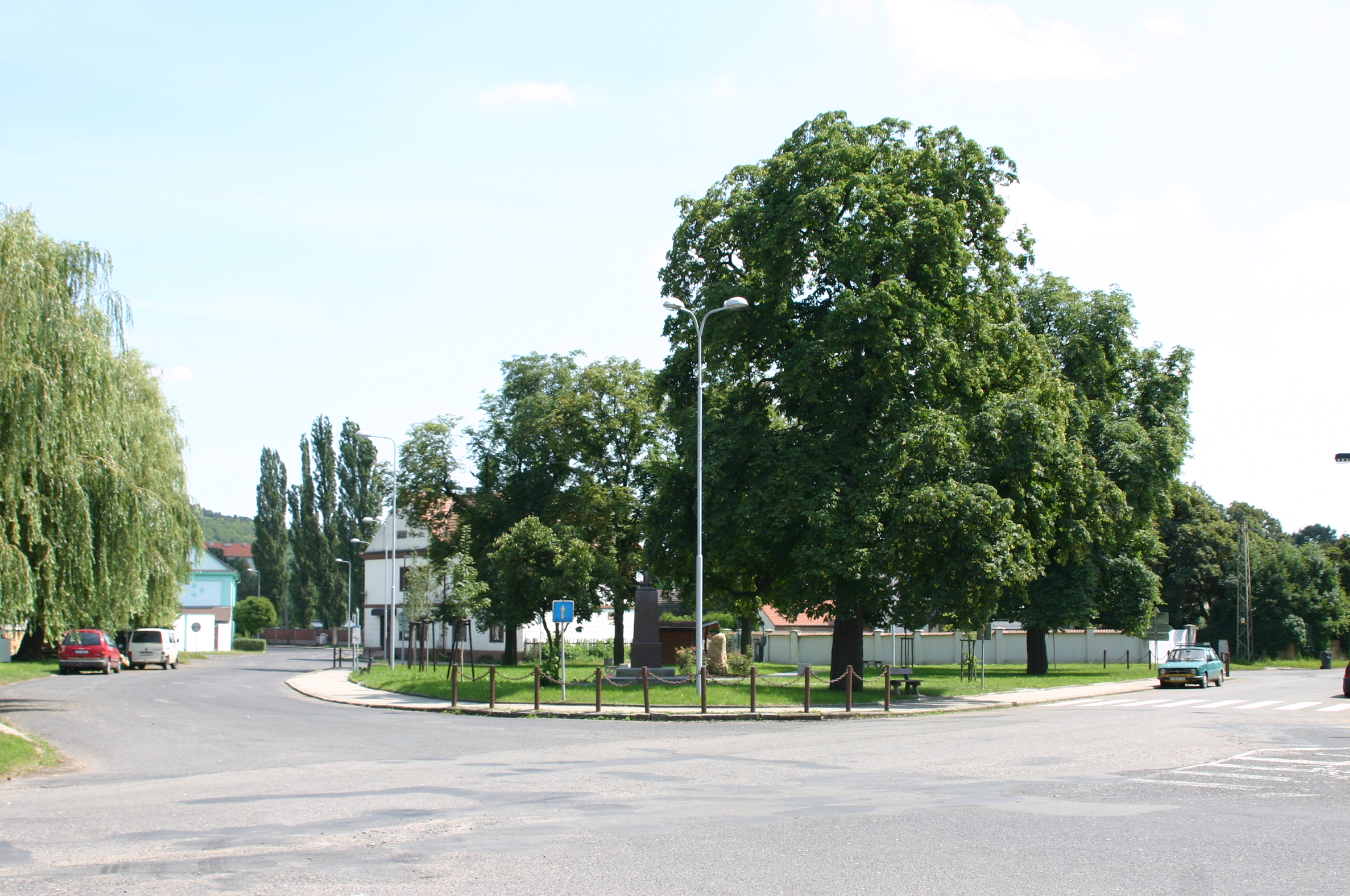
- Common in Braňany

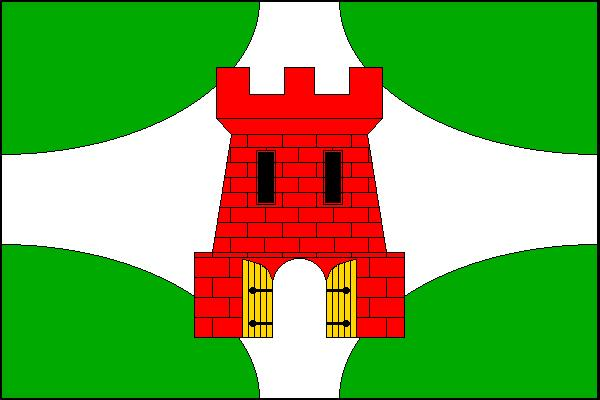
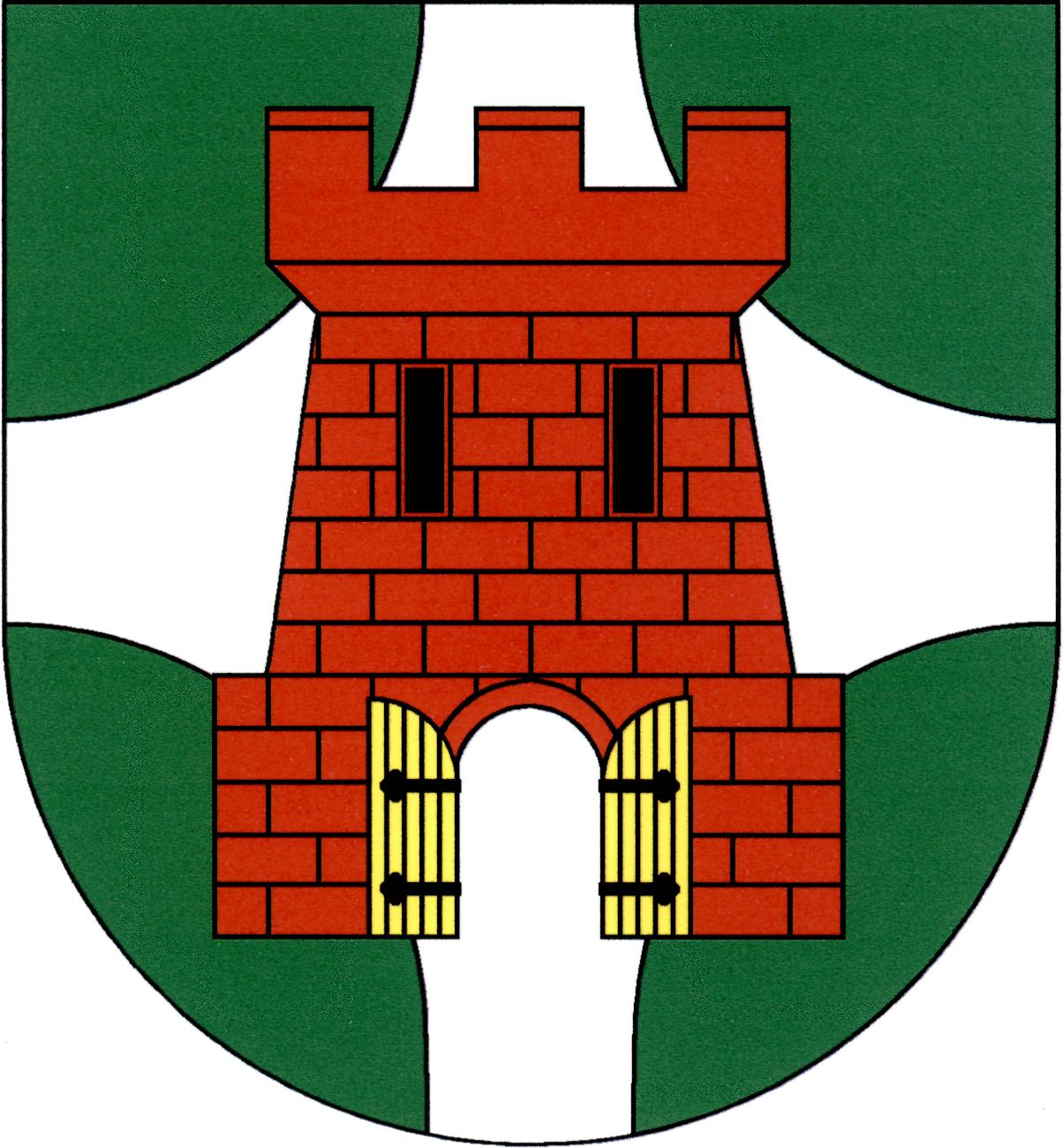
- Flag Coat of arms

- Location in the Czech Republic
- Coordinates: 50°32′35″N 13°42′0″E
- Country: Czech Republic
- Region: Ústí nad Labem
- District: Most
- First mentioned: 1239

Area
  - Total: 6.13 km^{2} (2.37 sq mi)
- Elevation: 253 m (830 ft)

Population (2026-01-01)
  - Total: 1,205
  - Density: 197/km^{2} (509/sq mi)
- Time zone: UTC+1 (CET)
  - Summer (DST): UTC+2 (CEST)
- Postal code: 435 22
- Website: www.branany.cz

Braňany (German: Prohn) is a municipality and village in Most District at the Ústí nad Labem Region of the Czech Republic. It has about 1,200 inhabitants.

Braňany lies approximately 7 kilometres (4 mi) north-east of Most, 28 km (17 mi) south-west of Ústí nad Labem, and 72 km (45 mi) north-west of Prague.

== Administrative division ==
Braňany consists of two municipal parts (in brackets population according to the 2021 census):

- Braňany (1,147)
- Kaňkov (27)

== Demographics ==
Historical population
| Year | Pop. | ±% |
|---|---|---|
| 1869 | 290 | — |
| 1880 | 537 | +85.2% |
| 1890 | 412 | −23.3% |
| 1900 | 736 | +78.6% |
| 1910 | 875 | +18.9% |
| 1921 | 1,042 | +19.1% |
| 1930 | 1,095 | +5.1% |
| 1950 | 1,077 | −1.6% |
| 1961 | 1,927 | +78.9% |
| 1970 | 1,706 | −11.5% |
| 1980 | 1,429 | −16.2% |
| 1991 | 1,143 | −20.0% |
| 2001 | 1,169 | +2.3% |
| 2011 | 1,157 | −1.0% |
| 2021 | 1,174 | +1.5% |
Source: Censuses
