= Mariánské Radčice =

- Municipality
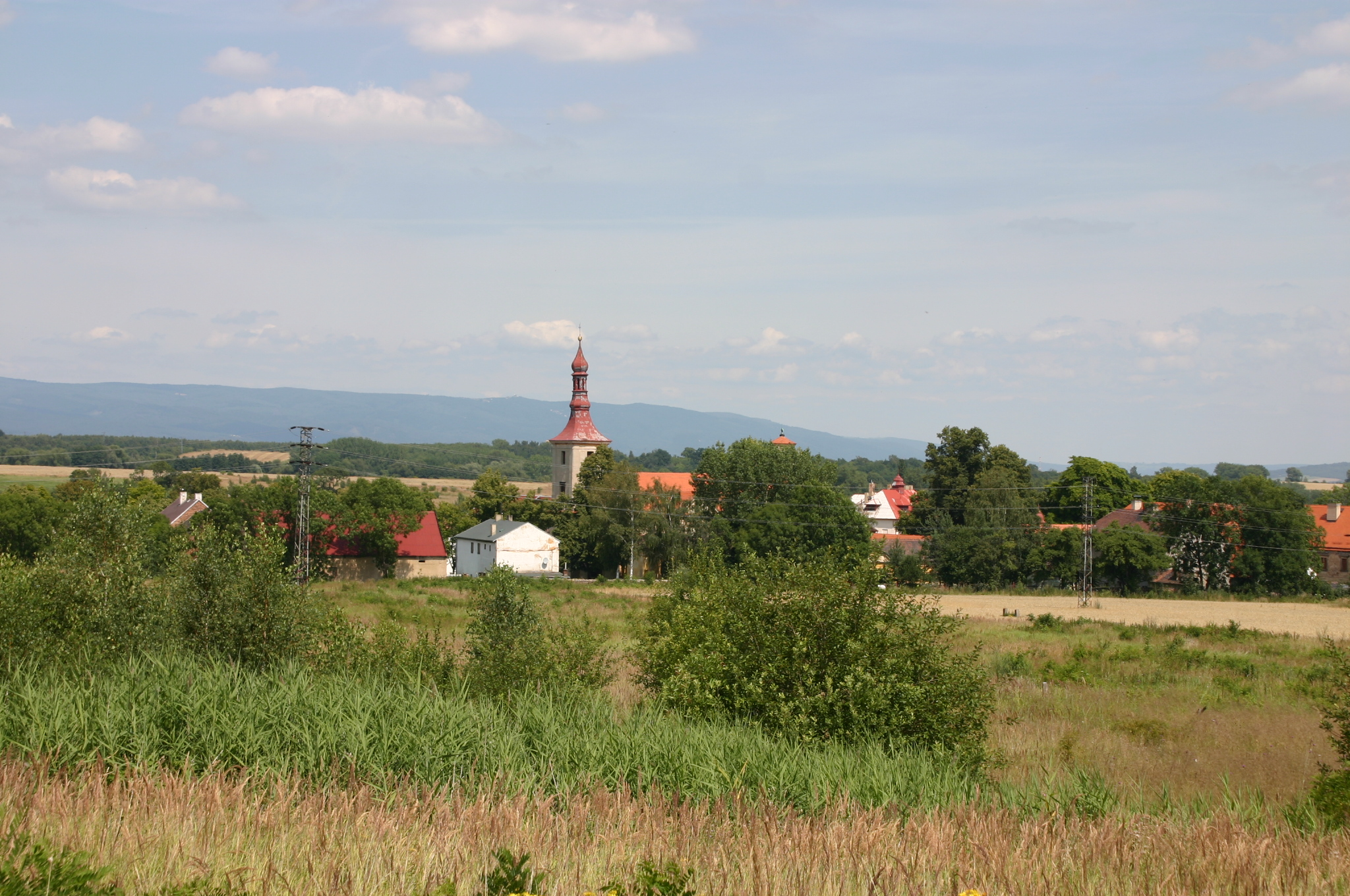
- View from the south

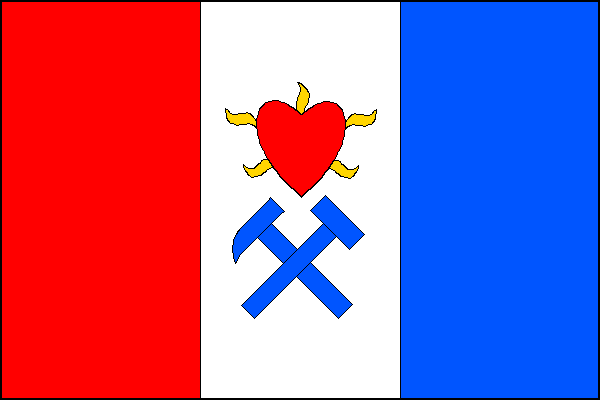
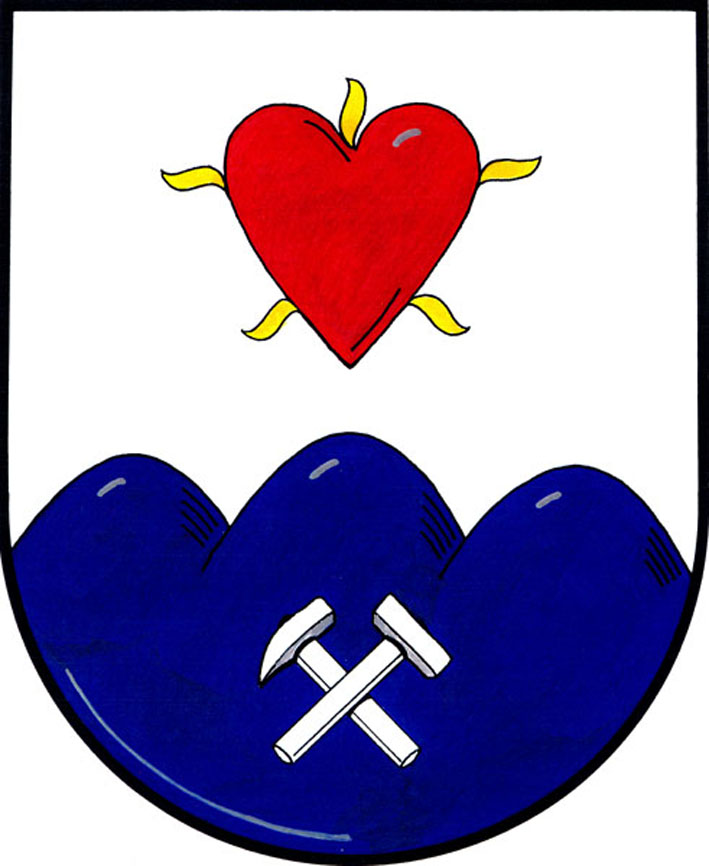
- Flag Coat of arms

- Location in the Czech Republic
- Coordinates: 50°34′27″N 13°39′54″E
- Country: Czech Republic
- Region: Ústí nad Labem
- District: Most
- First mentioned: 1341

Area
  - Total: 12.49 km^{2} (4.82 sq mi)
- Elevation: 258 m (846 ft)

Population (2026-01-01)
  - Total: 464
  - Density: 37.1/km^{2} (96.2/sq mi)
- Time zone: UTC+1 (CET)
  - Summer (DST): UTC+2 (CEST)
- Postal code: 435 32
- Website: www.marianskeradcice.cz

Mariánské Radčice (German: Maria Ratschitz) is a municipality and village in Most District in the Ústí nad Labem Region of the Czech Republic. It has about 500 inhabitants.

Mariánské Radčice lies approximately 9 kilometres (6 mi) north of Most, 29 km (18 mi) west of Ústí nad Labem, and 77 km (48 mi) north-west of Prague.

== Administrative division ==
Mariánské Radčice consists of two municipal parts (in brackets population according to the 2021 census):

- Mariánské Radčice (463)
- Libkovice (0)

== Demographics ==
Historical population
Year	Pop.	±%
1869	823	—
1880	906	+10.1%
1890	1,063	+17.3%
1900	1,825	+71.7%
1910	2,349	+28.7%
1921	2,801	+19.2%
1930	3,349	+19.6%
1950	2,947	−12.0%
1961	2,117	−28.2%
1970	1,759	−16.9%
1980	1,405	−20.1%
1991	581	−58.6%
2001	380	−34.6%
2011	441	+16.1%
2021	463	+5.0%
Source: Censuses

== Notable people ==
- Antonín Kubálek (1935–2011), Czech-Canadian pianist
