= Lišnice =

- Municipality
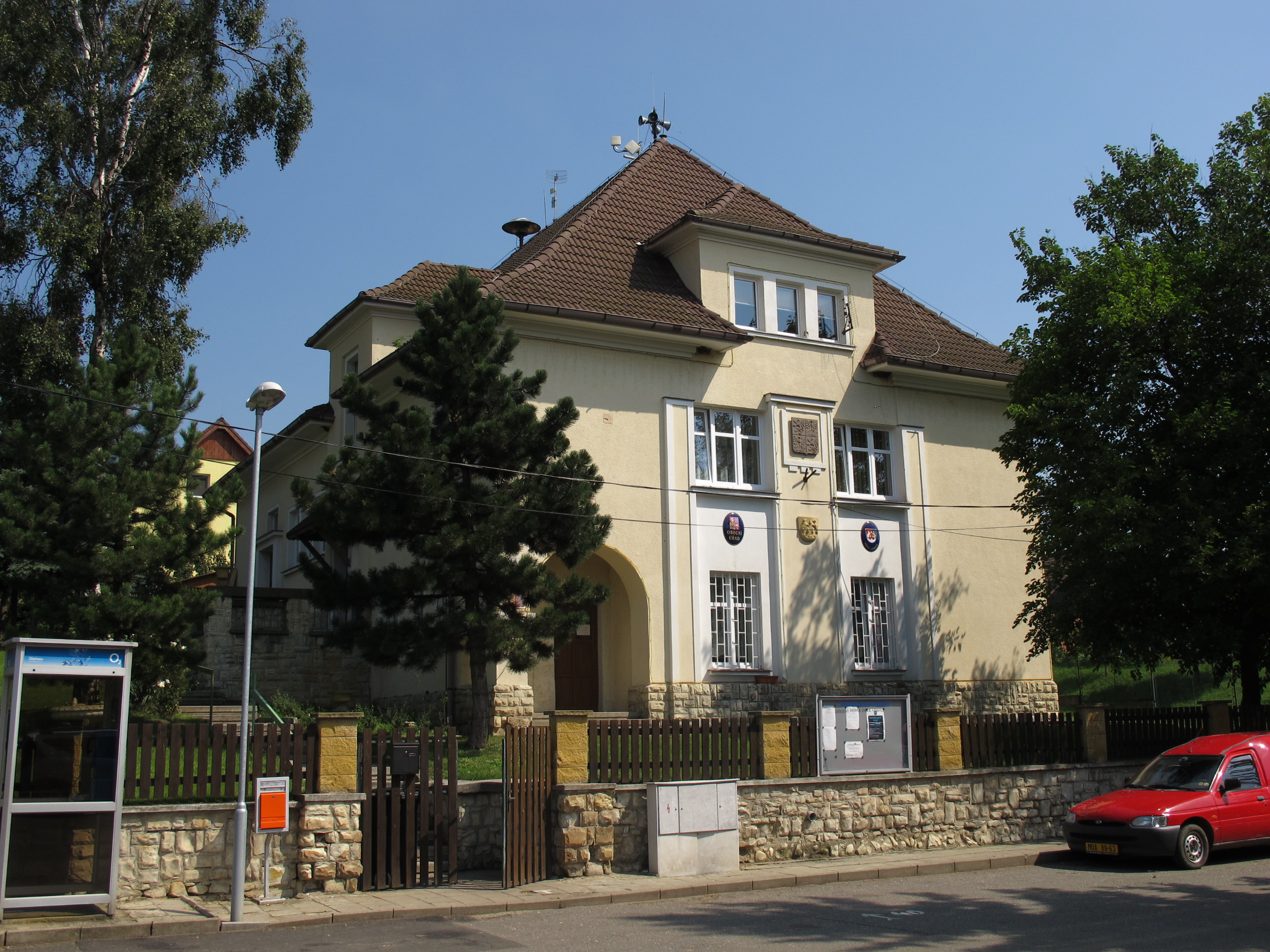
- Municipal office

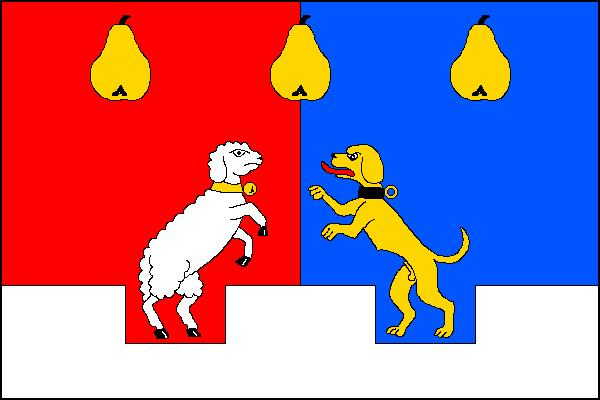
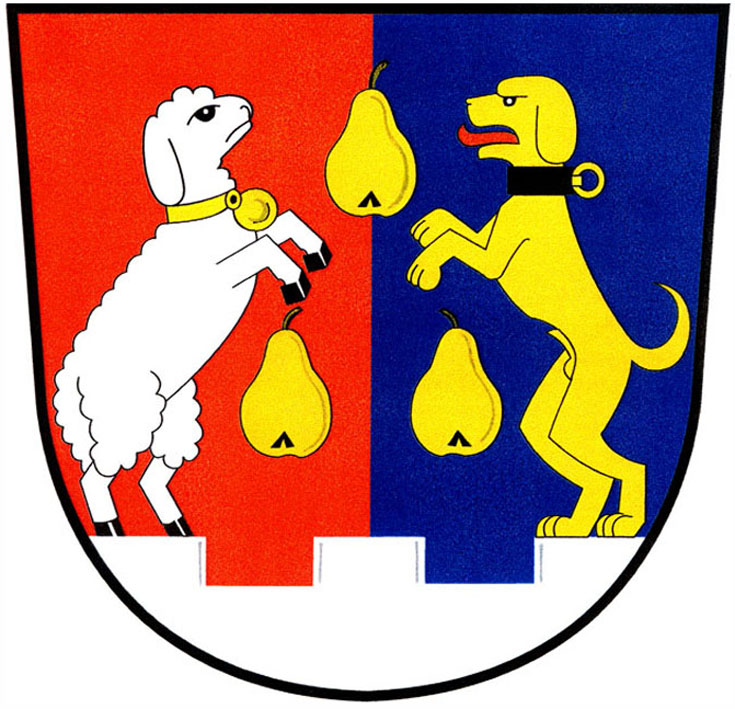
- Flag Coat of arms

- Location in the Czech Republic
- Coordinates: 50°27′16″N 13°37′59″E
- Country: Czech Republic
- Region: Ústí nad Labem
- District: Most
- First mentioned: 1480

Area
  - Total: 8.53 km^{2} (3.29 sq mi)
- Elevation: 223 m (732 ft)

Population (2026-01-01)
  - Total: 225
  - Density: 26.4/km^{2} (68.3/sq mi)
- Time zone: UTC+1 (CET)
  - Summer (DST): UTC+2 (CEST)
- Postal code: 434 01
- Website: www.oulisnice.cz

Lišnice (German: Lischnitz) is a municipality and village in Most District in the Ústí nad Labem Region of the Czech Republic. It has about 200 inhabitants.

Lišnice lies approximately 6 kilometres (4 mi) south of Most and 37 km (23 mi) southwest of Ústí nad Labem.

== Administrative division ==
Lišnice consists of three municipal parts (in brackets population according to the 2021 census):

- Lišnice (122)
- Koporeč (38)
- Nemilkov (38)

== Demographics ==
Historical population
Year	Pop.	±%
1869	708	—
1880	832	+17.5%
1890	888	+6.7%
1900	878	−1.1%
1910	828	−5.7%
1921	838	+1.2%
1930	812	−3.1%
1950	509	−37.3%
1961	441	−13.4%
1970	328	−25.6%
1980	239	−27.1%
1991	166	−30.5%
2001	181	+9.0%
2011	215	+18.8%
2021	198	−7.9%
Source: Censuses
