= Brandov =

- Municipality
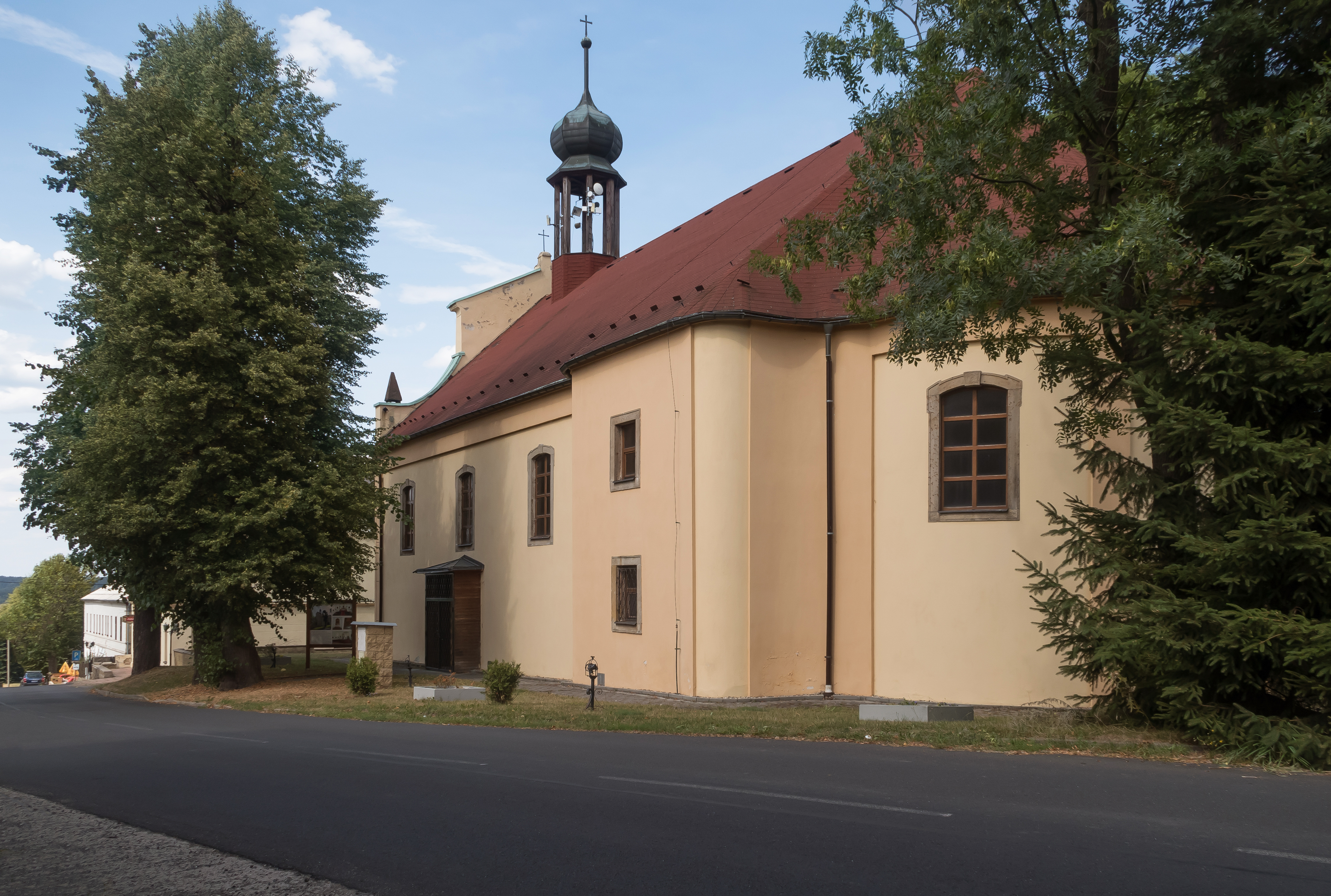
- Church of Saint Michael the Archangel

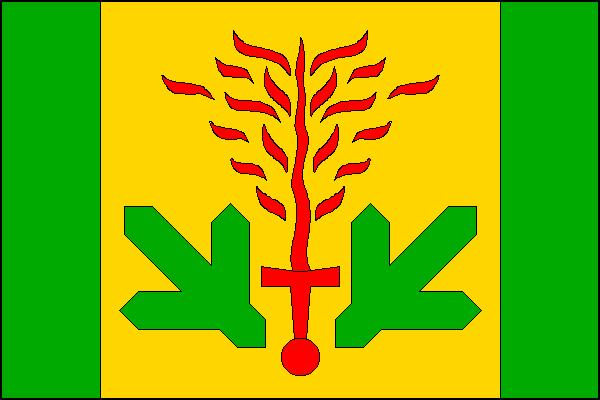
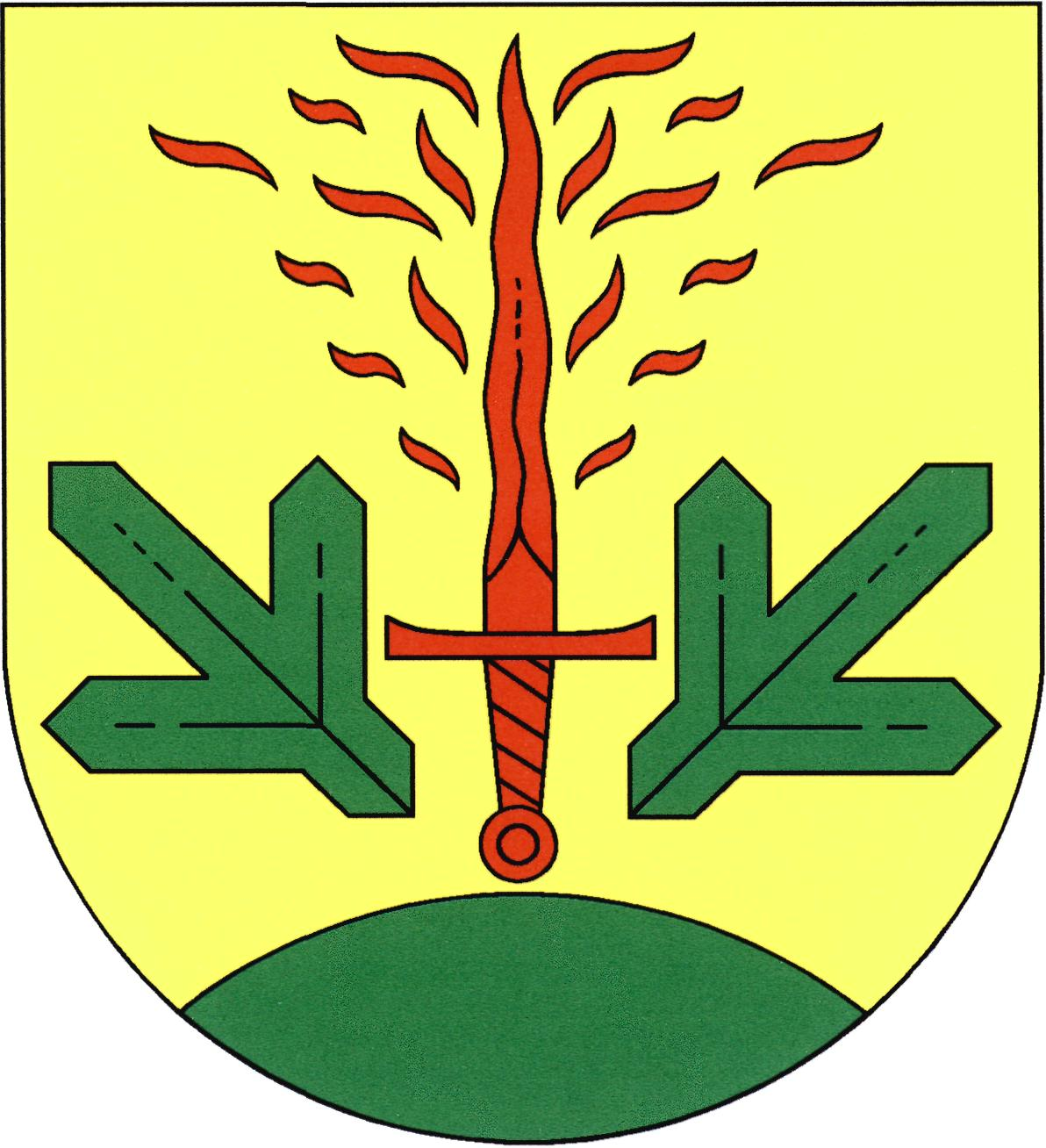
- Flag Coat of arms

- Location in the Czech Republic
- Coordinates: 50°37′56″N 13°23′27″E
- Country: Czech Republic
- Region: Ústí nad Labem
- District: Most
- First mentioned: 1549

Area
  - Total: 12.30 km^{2} (4.75 sq mi)
- Elevation: 543 m (1,781 ft)

Population (2026-01-01)
  - Total: 301
  - Density: 24.5/km^{2} (63.4/sq mi)
- Time zone: UTC+1 (CET)
  - Summer (DST): UTC+2 (CEST)
- Postal code: 435 47
- Website: www.brandov.cz

Brandov (German: Brandau) is a municipality and village in Most District in the Ústí nad Labem Region of the Czech Republic. It has about 300 inhabitants.

== Etymology ==
In the oldest documents, the name was written as Brantov. The name was probably derived from the surname Brant, meaning "Brant's".

== Geography ==
Brandov is located about 22 kilometres (14 mi) northwest of Most and 45 km (28 mi) west of Ústí nad Labem. It is located on the Czech–German border and is adjacent to the municipality of Olbernhau in Saxony. Brandov lies in the Ore Mountains. The highest peak in the municipal territory is Kamenný vrch at 842 m (2,762 ft) above sea level.

== History ==
The first written mention of Brandov is from 1549. Until the establishment of an independent municipality in 1850, the village belonged to the Červený Hrádek estate. From 1853 to the 1920s, Brandov was known for anthracite mining. The municipality was inhabited mainly by ethnic Germans, but they were expelled after World War II and the population of Brandov decreased significantly.

== Demographics ==
Historical population

Year	Pop.	±%
1869	1,229	—
1880	1,428	+16.2%
1890	1,717	+20.2%
1900	2,131	+24.1%
1910	2,896	+35.9%

Year	Pop.	±%
1921	2,572	−11.2%
1930	2,473	−3.8%
1950	393	−84.1%
1961	453	+15.3%
1970	419	−7.5%

Year	Pop.	±%
1980	269	−35.8%
1991	237	−11.9%
2001	257	+8.4%
2011	243	−5.4%
2021	270	+11.1%

Source: Censuses

== Transport ==
There are no railways or major roads passing through the municipality. On the Czech–German border is the road border crossing Brandov / Olbernhau.

== Sights ==
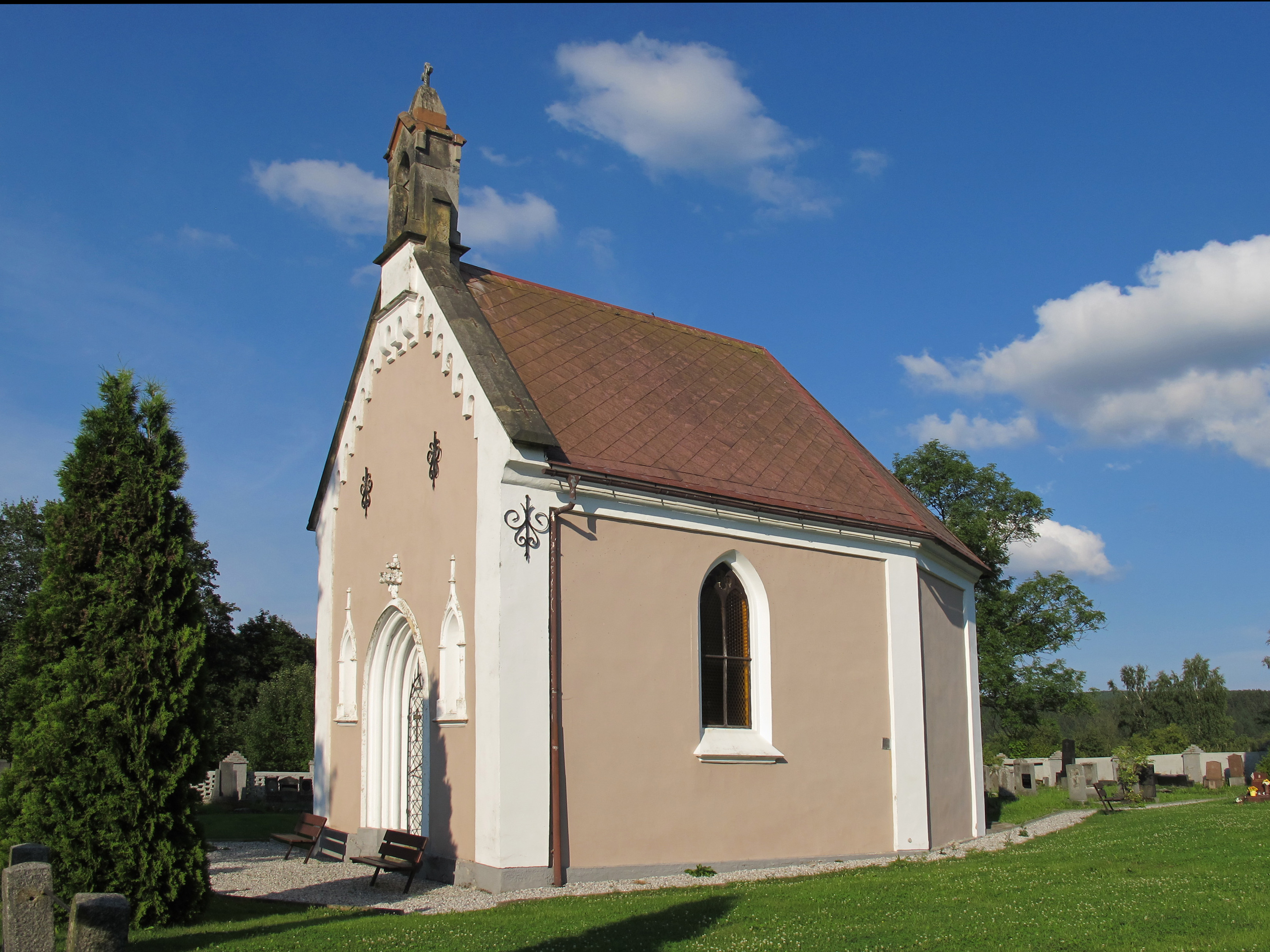
Chapel of the Resurrection of Christ

The main landmark of Brandov is the Church of Saint Michael the Archangel. It was built in the Baroque style in 1720–1730.

A cultural monument is the Chapel of the Resurrection of Christ, located on the local cemetery. It was built in the neo-Gothic style in 1884.
