= Bečov =

- Municipality
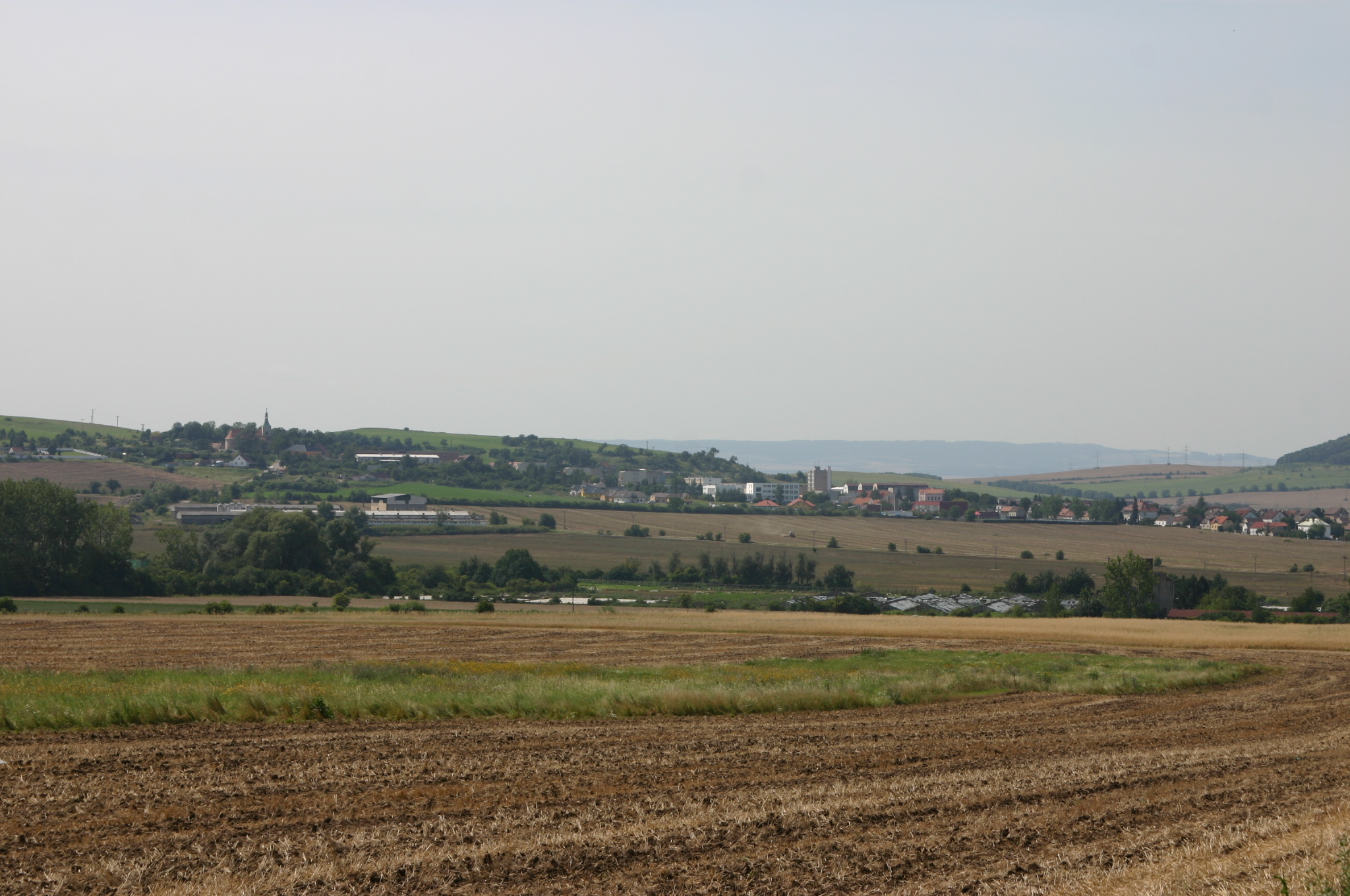
- Bečov seen from the north

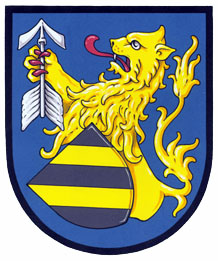
- Flag Coat of arms

- Location in the Czech Republic
- Coordinates: 50°26′59″N 13°43′5″E
- Country: Czech Republic
- Region: Ústí nad Labem
- District: Most
- First mentioned: 1327

Area
  - Total: 28.23 km^{2} (10.90 sq mi)
- Elevation: 255 m (837 ft)

Population (2026-01-01)
  - Total: 1,388
  - Density: 49.17/km^{2} (127.3/sq mi)
- Time zone: UTC+1 (CET)
  - Summer (DST): UTC+2 (CEST)
- Postal code: 435 26
- Website: www.oubecov.cz

Bečov (German: Hochpetsch) is a municipality and village in Most District in the Ústí nad Labem Region of the Czech Republic. It has about 1,400 inhabitants.

Bečov lies approximately 9 kilometres (6 mi) south-east of Most, 33 km (21 mi) south-west of Ústí nad Labem, and 65 km (40 mi) north-west of Prague.

== Administrative division ==
Bečov consists of three municipal parts (in brackets population according to the 2021 census):

- Bečov (1,301)
- Milá (31)
- Zaječice (30)

== Demographics ==
Historical population
Year	Pop.	±%
1869	1,368	—
1880	1,642	+20.0%
1890	1,614	−1.7%
1900	1,599	−0.9%
1910	1,999	+25.0%
1921	1,975	−1.2%
1930	1,999	+1.2%
1950	1,333	−33.3%
1961	1,323	−0.8%
1970	973	−26.5%
1980	1,989	+104.4%
1991	1,804	−9.3%
2001	2,079	+15.2%
2011	1,630	−21.6%
2021	1,362	−16.4%
Source: Censuses
