= Lužice (Most District) =

- Municipality
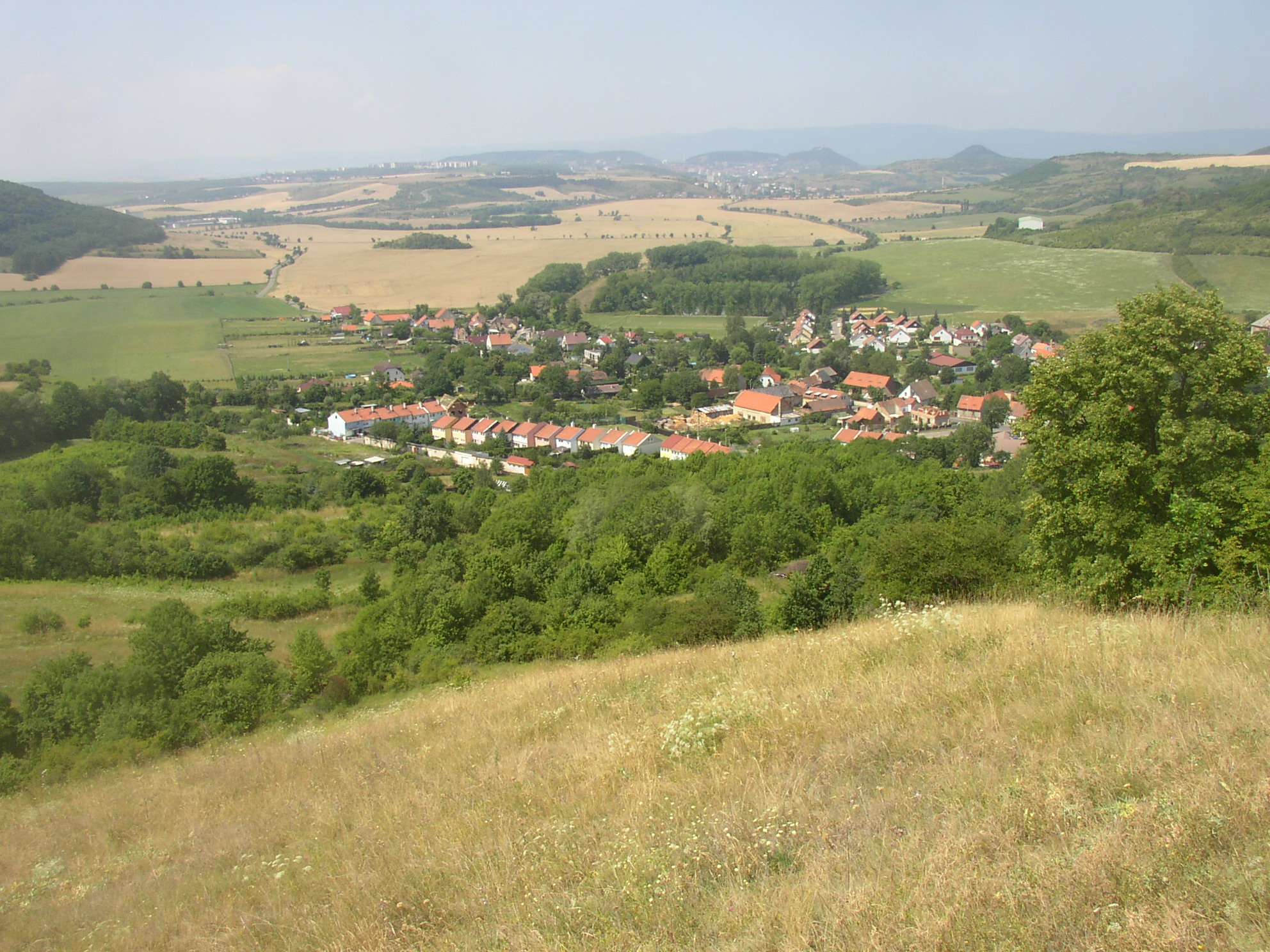
- View from the southeast

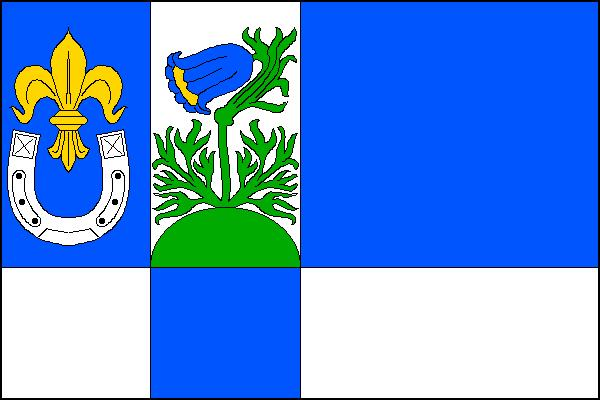
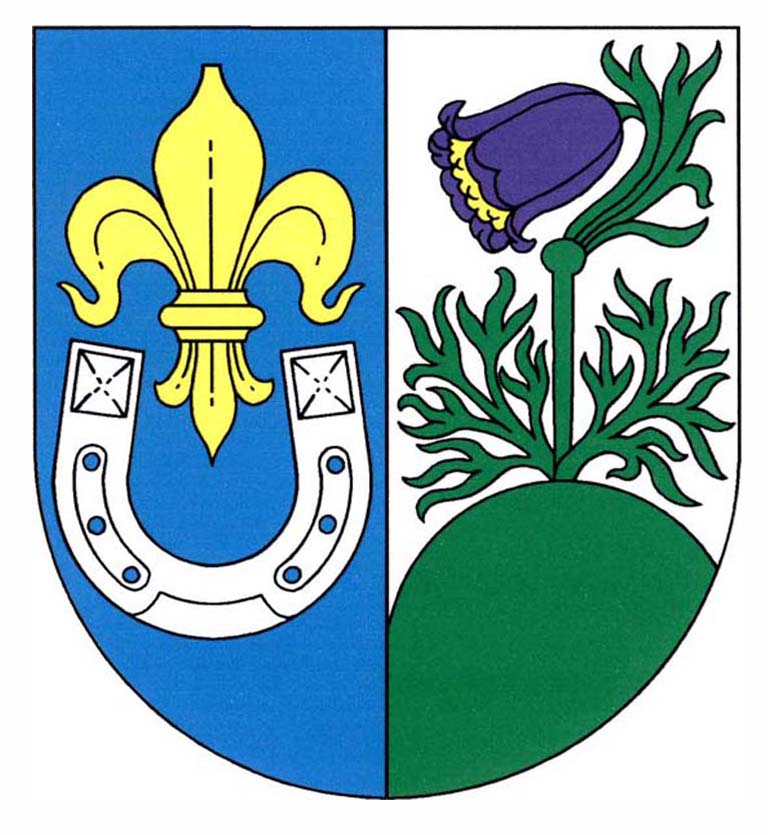
- Flag Coat of arms

- Location in the Czech Republic
- Coordinates: 50°29′30″N 13°45′15″E
- Country: Czech Republic
- Region: Ústí nad Labem
- District: Most
- First mentioned: 1226

Area
  - Total: 8.80 km^{2} (3.40 sq mi)
- Elevation: 245 m (804 ft)

Population (2026-01-01)
  - Total: 574
  - Density: 65.2/km^{2} (169/sq mi)
- Time zone: UTC+1 (CET)
  - Summer (DST): UTC+2 (CEST)
- Postal code: 435 24
- Website: www.luzice.eu

Lužice (German: Luschitz) is a municipality and village in Most District in the Ústí nad Labem Region of the Czech Republic. It has about 600 inhabitants.

Lužice lies approximately 9 kilometres (6 mi) east of Most, 28 km (17 mi) south-west of Ústí nad Labem, and 66 km (41 mi) north-west of Prague.

== Administrative division ==
Lužice consists of two municipal parts (in brackets population according to the 2021 census):

- Lužice (457)
- Svinčice (91)

== History ==
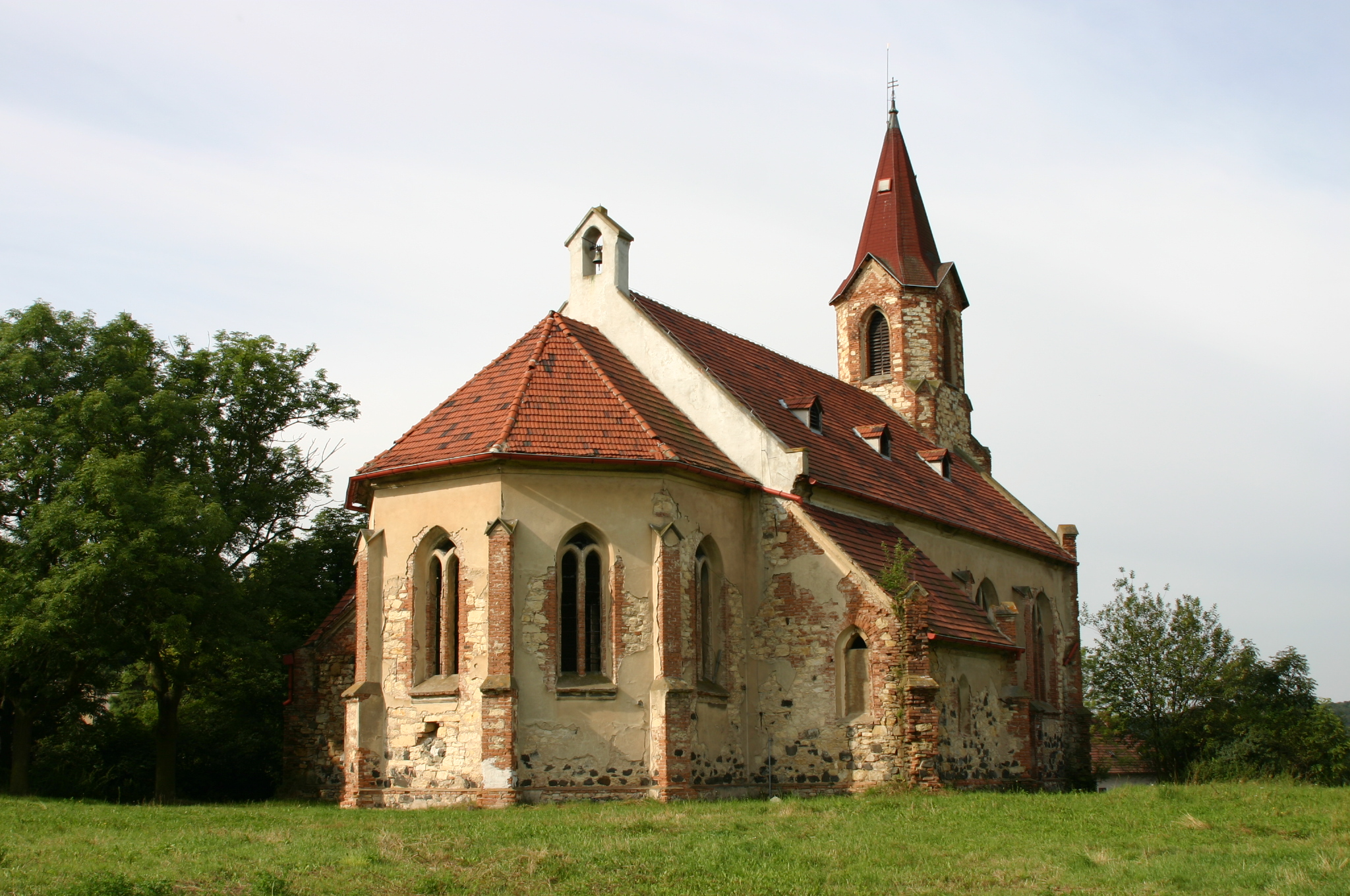
Church of Saint Augustine

The first written mention of Lužice is from 1226, Svinčice is mentioned already in 1207. Existence of the Church of Saint Augustine is documented in the 14th century.

== Demographics ==
Historical population
Year	Pop.	±%
1869	453	—
1880	506	+11.7%
1890	486	−4.0%
1900	489	+0.6%
1910	518	+5.9%
1921	550	+6.2%
1930	582	+5.8%
1950	373	−35.9%
1961	391	+4.8%
1970	334	−14.6%
1980	310	−7.2%
1991	424	+36.8%
2001	422	−0.5%
2011	450	+6.6%
2021	548	+21.8%
Source: Censuses
