= Patokryje =

- Municipality
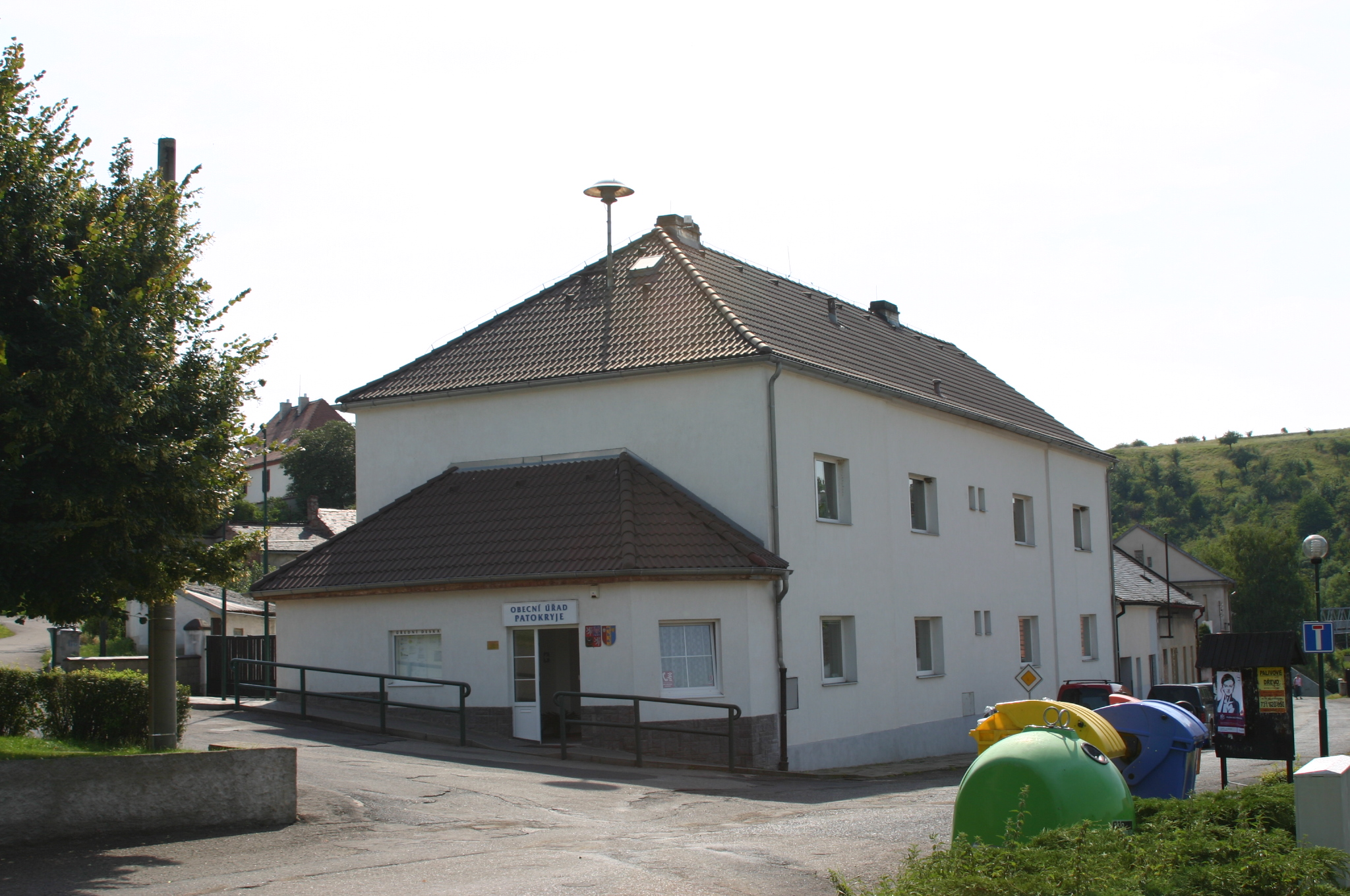
- Municipal office

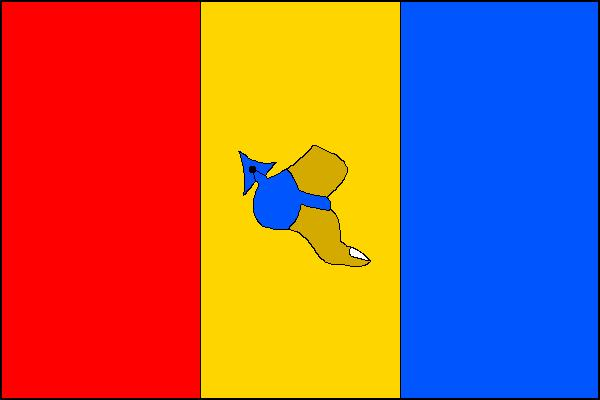
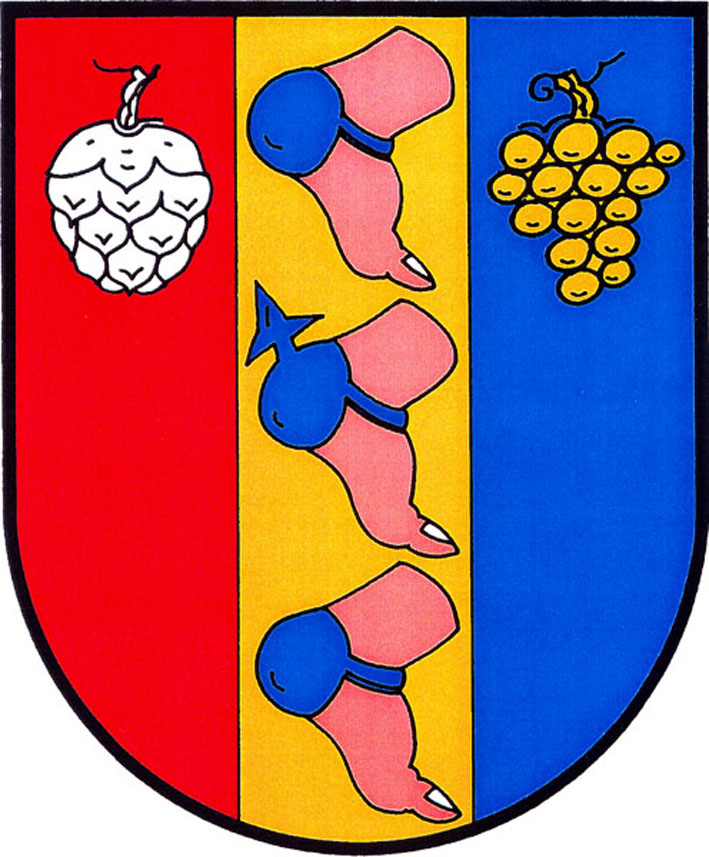
- Flag Coat of arms

- Location in the Czech Republic
- Coordinates: 50°30′0″N 13°42′19″E
- Country: Czech Republic
- Region: Ústí nad Labem
- District: Most
- First mentioned: 1342

Area
  - Total: 2.63 km^{2} (1.02 sq mi)
- Elevation: 221 m (725 ft)

Population (2026-01-01)
  - Total: 443
  - Density: 168/km^{2} (436/sq mi)
- Time zone: UTC+1 (CET)
  - Summer (DST): UTC+2 (CEST)
- Postal code: 434 01
- Website: www.patokryje.cz

Patokryje (German: Patokrey) is a municipality and village in Most District in the Ústí nad Labem Region of the Czech Republic. It has about 400 inhabitants.

Patokryje lies approximately 5 kilometres (3 mi) east of Most, 30 km (19 mi) south-west of Ústí nad Labem, and 69 km (43 mi) north-west of Prague.

== Demographics ==
Historical population
Year	Pop.	±%
1869	182	—
1880	195	+7.1%
1890	209	+7.2%
1900	281	+34.4%
1910	313	+11.4%
1921	373	+19.2%
1930	516	+38.3%
1950	332	−35.7%
1961	338	+1.8%
1970	289	−14.5%
1980	200	−30.8%
1991	342	+71.0%
2001	402	+17.5%
2011	412	+2.5%
2021	457	+10.9%
Source: Censuses
