= Želenice (Most District) =

- Municipality
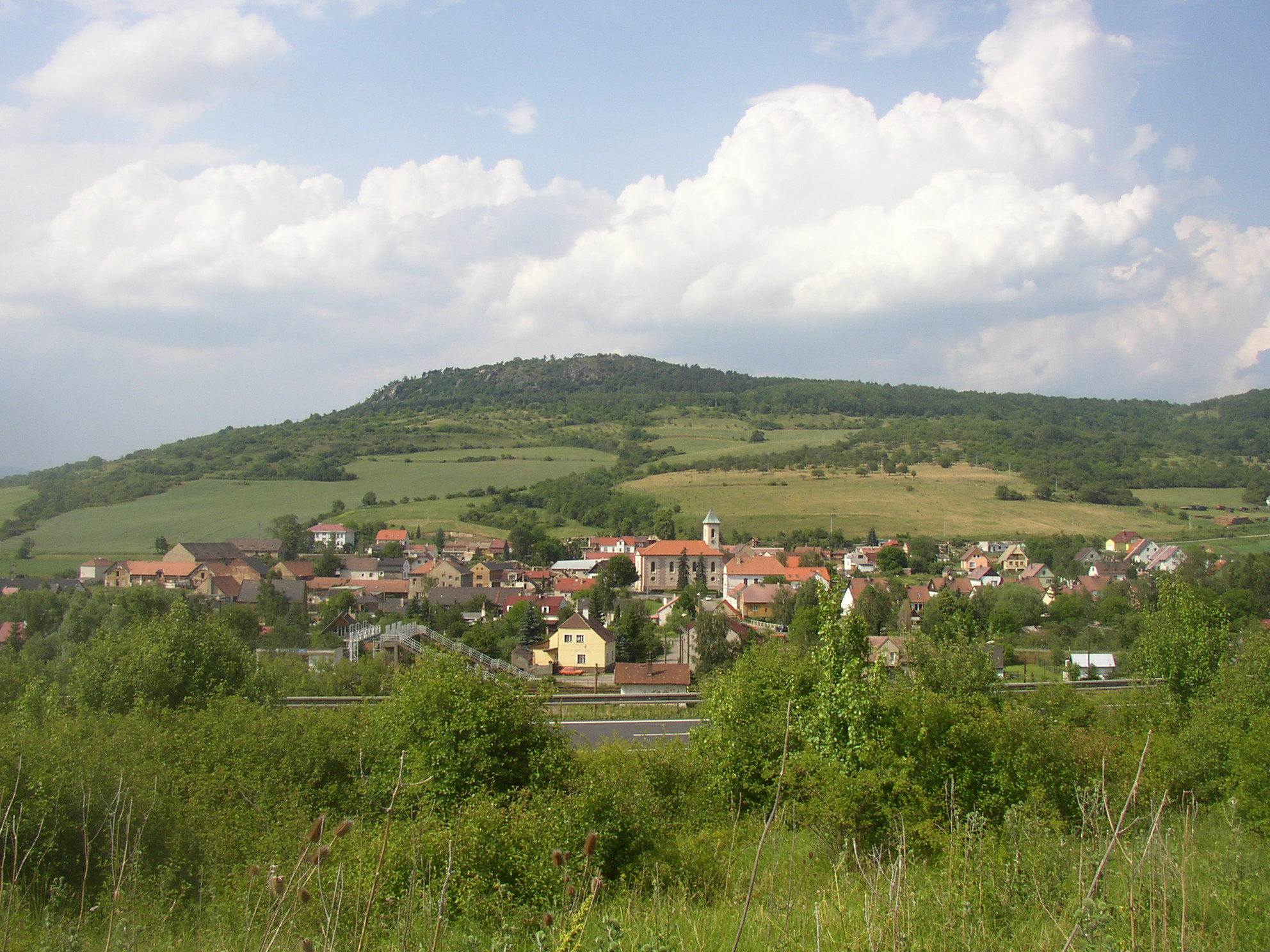
- View from the south with Kaňkov Hill

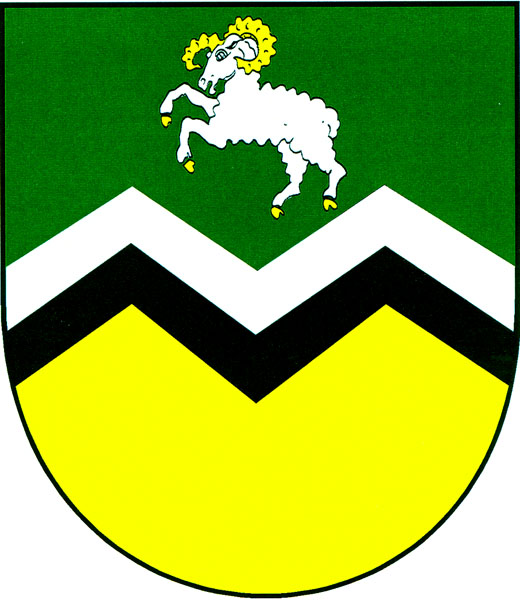
- Flag Coat of arms

- Location in the Czech Republic
- Coordinates: 50°31′40″N 13°43′34″E
- Country: Czech Republic
- Region: Ústí nad Labem
- District: Most
- First mentioned: 1307

Area
  - Total: 9.75 km^{2} (3.76 sq mi)
- Elevation: 211 m (692 ft)

Population (2026-01-01)
  - Total: 489
  - Density: 50.2/km^{2} (130/sq mi)
- Time zone: UTC+1 (CET)
  - Summer (DST): UTC+2 (CEST)
- Postal code: 434 01
- Website: www.zelenice.cz

Želenice (German: Sellnitz) is a municipality and village in Most District in the Ústí nad Labem Region of the Czech Republic. It has about 500 inhabitants.

Želenice lies approximately 8 kilometres (5 mi) north-east of Most, 27 km (17 mi) south-west of Ústí nad Labem, and 70 km (43 mi) north-west of Prague.

== Administrative division ==
Želenice consists of two municipal parts (in brackets population according to the 2021 census):

- Želenice (325)
- Liběšice (128)

== Demographics ==
Historical population
Year	Pop.	±%
1869	518	—
1880	620	+19.7%
1890	620	+0.0%
1900	622	+0.3%
1910	702	+12.9%
1921	673	−4.1%
1930	791	+17.5%
1950	584	−26.2%
1961	586	+0.3%
1970	469	−20.0%
1980	438	−6.6%
1991	343	−21.7%
2001	393	+14.6%
2011	450	+14.5%
2021	453	+0.7%
Source: Censuses
