= Skršín =

- Municipality
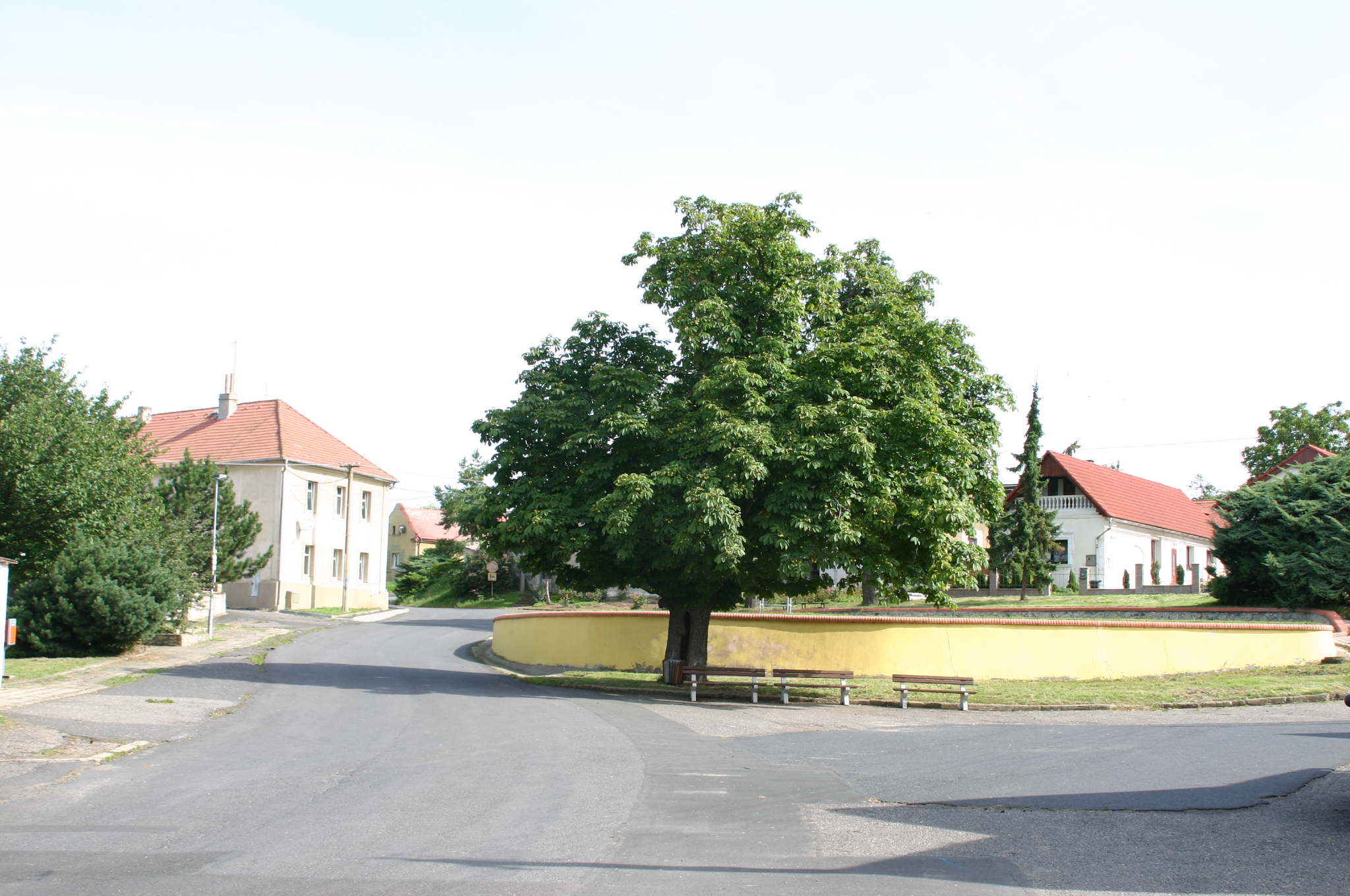
- Centre of Skršín

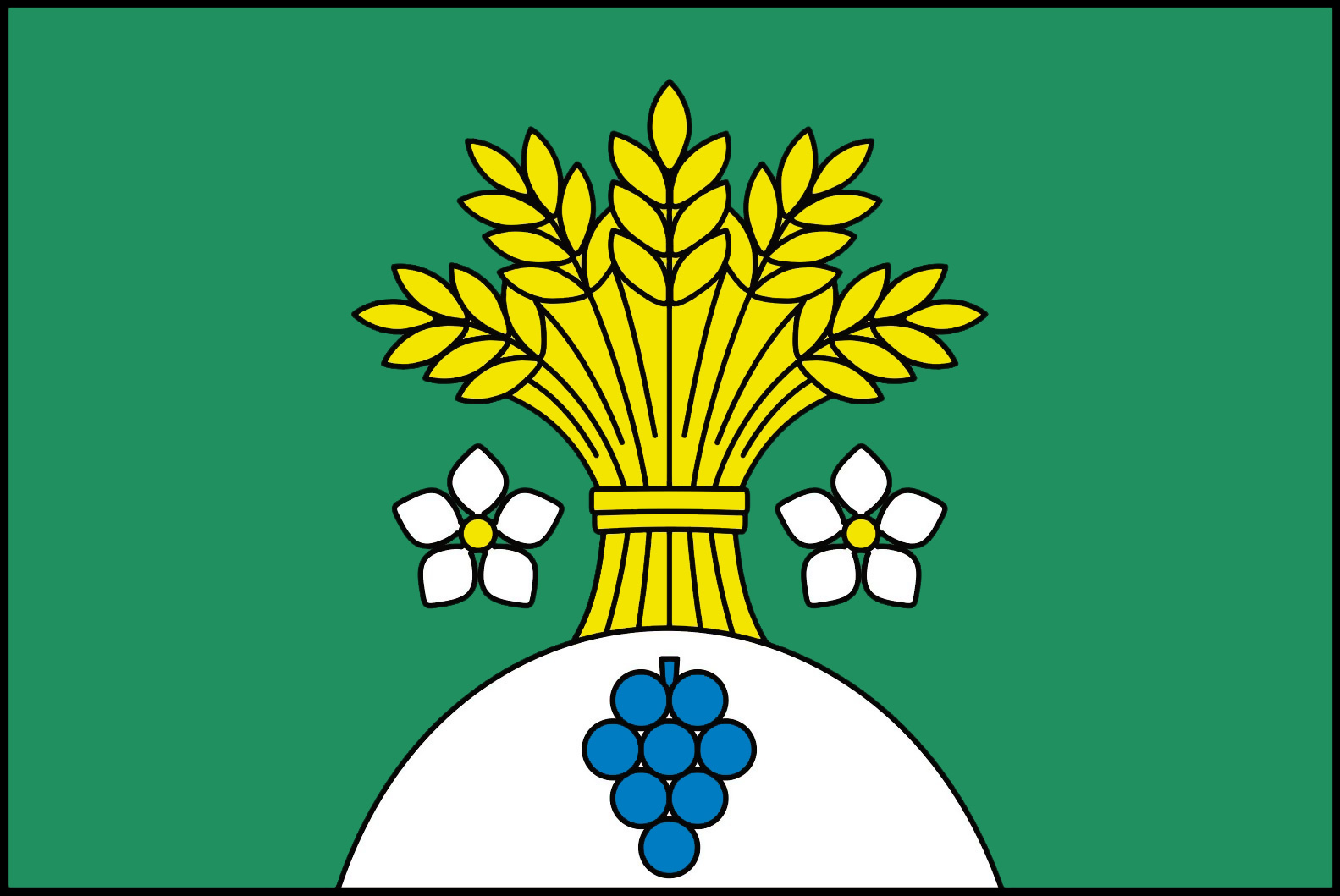
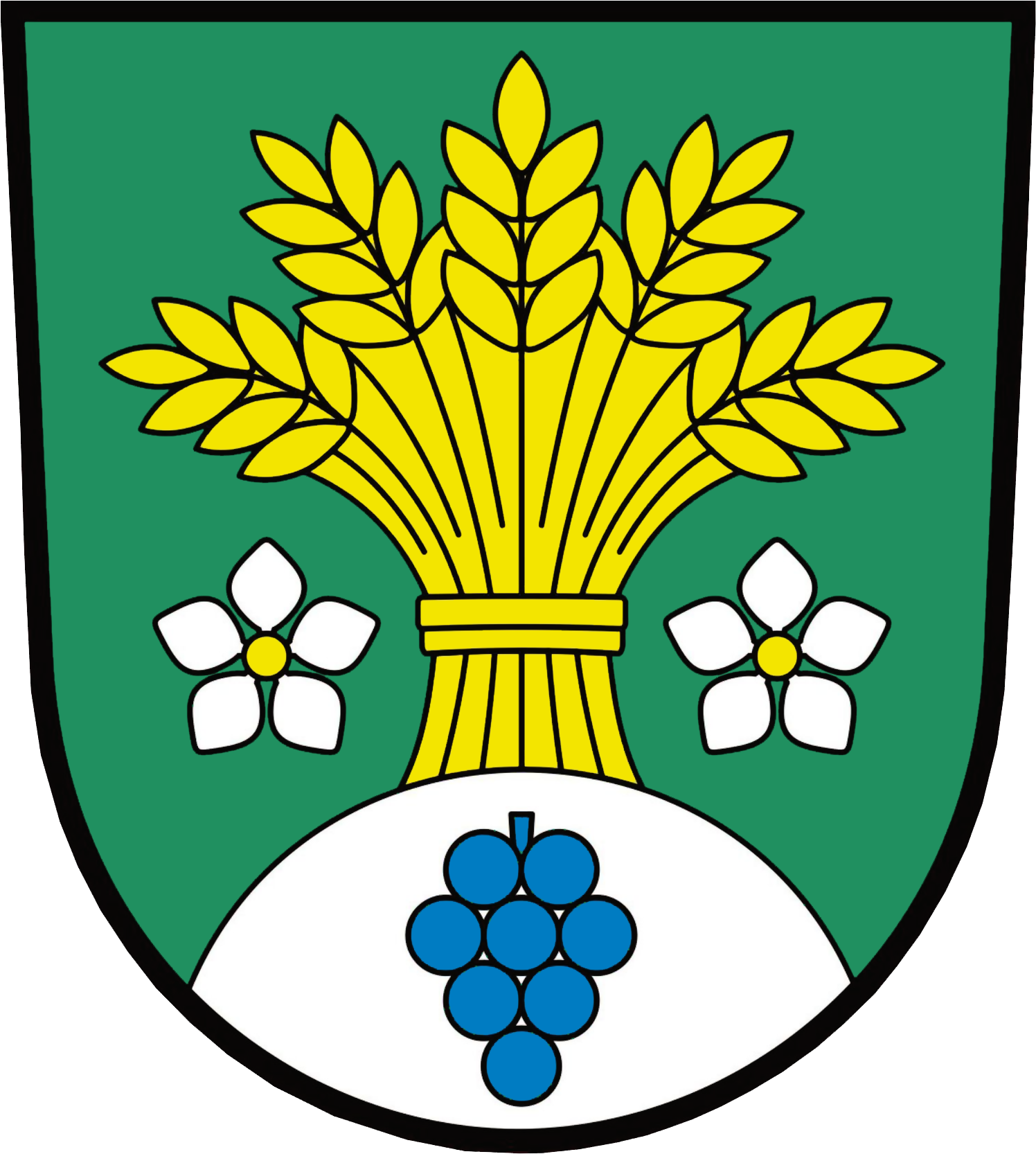
- Flag Coat of arms

- Location in the Czech Republic
- Coordinates: 50°27′57″N 13°45′16″E
- Country: Czech Republic
- Region: Ústí nad Labem
- District: Most
- First mentioned: 1100

Area
  - Total: 6.98 km^{2} (2.69 sq mi)
- Elevation: 323 m (1,060 ft)

Population (2026-01-01)
  - Total: 318
  - Density: 45.6/km^{2} (118/sq mi)
- Time zone: UTC+1 (CET)
  - Summer (DST): UTC+2 (CEST)
- Postal code: 434 01
- Website: skrsin.cz

Skršín (German: Skirschina) is a municipality and village in Most District in the Ústí nad Labem Region of the Czech Republic. It has about 300 inhabitants.

Skršín lies approximately 9 kilometres (6 mi) south-east of Most, 30 km (19 mi) south-west of Ústí nad Labem, and 64 km (40 mi) north-west of Prague.

== Administrative division ==
Skršín consists of three municipal parts (in brackets population according to the 2021 census):

- Skršín (154)
- Chrámce (45)
- Dobrčice (68)

== Demographics ==
Historical population
Year	Pop.	±%
1869	468	—
1880	517	+10.5%
1890	525	+1.5%
1900	489	−6.9%
1910	497	+1.6%
1921	459	−7.6%
1930	457	−0.4%
1950	239	−47.7%
1961	217	−9.2%
1970	187	−13.8%
1980	198	+5.9%
1991	164	−17.2%
2001	197	+20.1%
2011	209	+6.1%
2021	267	+27.8%
Source: Censuses
