= Havraň =

- Municipality
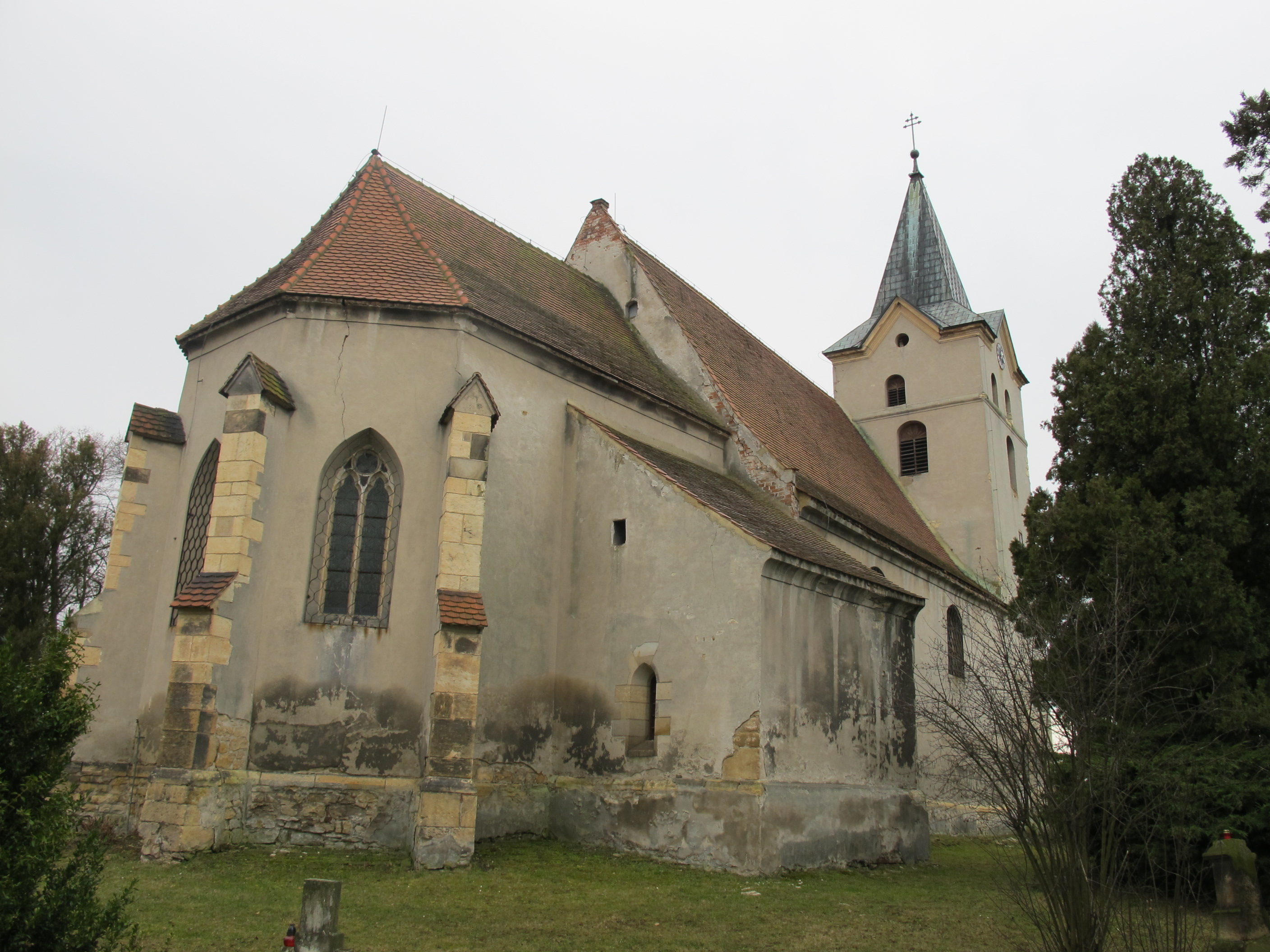
- Church of Saint Lawrence

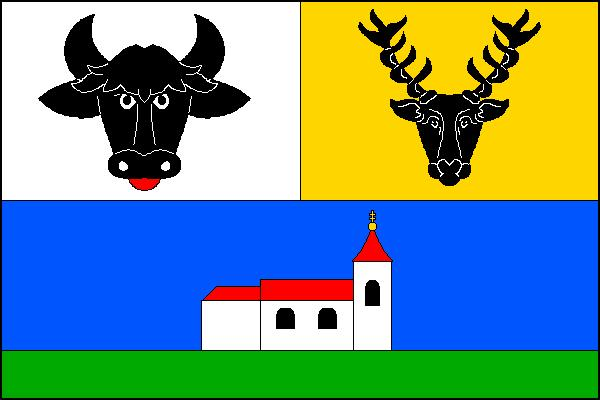
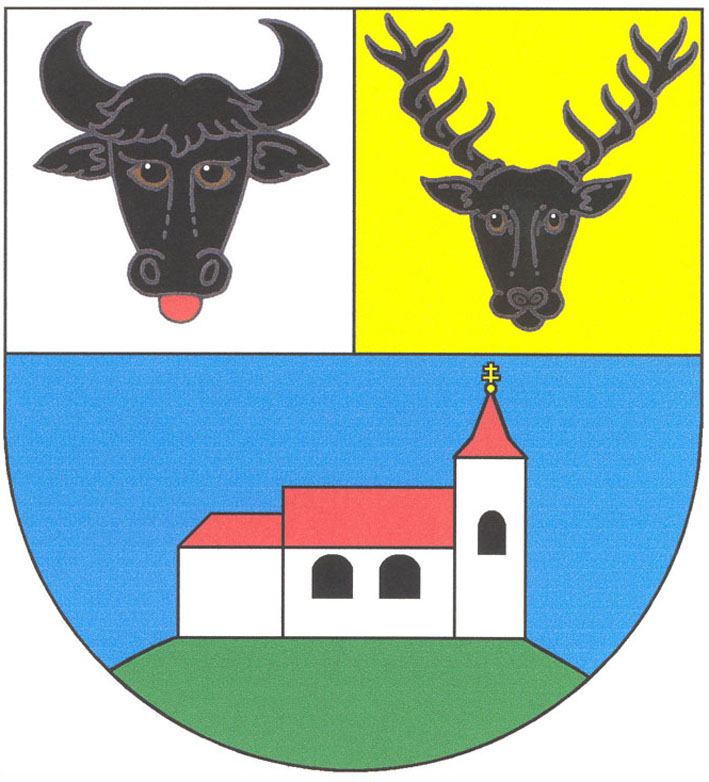
- Flag Coat of arms

- Location in the Czech Republic
- Coordinates: 50°27′0″N 13°35′56″E
- Country: Czech Republic
- Region: Ústí nad Labem
- District: Most
- First mentioned: 1281

Area
  - Total: 17.16 km^{2} (6.63 sq mi)
- Elevation: 245 m (804 ft)

Population (2026-01-01)
  - Total: 643
  - Density: 37.5/km^{2} (97.0/sq mi)
- Time zone: UTC+1 (CET)
  - Summer (DST): UTC+2 (CEST)
- Postal code: 435 01
- Website: www.ouhavran.cz

Havraň (German: Hawran) is a municipality and village in Most District in the Ústí nad Labem Region of the Czech Republic. It has about 600 inhabitants.

Havraň lies approximately 7 kilometres (4 mi) south-west of Most, 40 km (25 mi) south-west of Ústí nad Labem, and 71 km (44 mi) north-west of Prague.

== Administrative division ==
Havraň consists of three municipal parts (in brackets population according to the 2021 census):

- Havraň (430)
- Moravěves (77)
- Saběnice (121)

== Demographics ==
Historical population
Year	Pop.	±%
1869	810	—
1880	1,085	+34.0%
1890	1,471	+35.6%
1900	1,455	−1.1%
1910	1,281	−12.0%
1921	1,274	−0.5%
1930	1,320	+3.6%
1950	928	−29.7%
1961	906	−2.4%
1970	698	−23.0%
1980	608	−12.9%
1991	451	−25.8%
2001	494	+9.5%
2011	525	+6.3%
2021	628	+19.6%
Source: Censuses
