= Lom (Most District) =

- Town
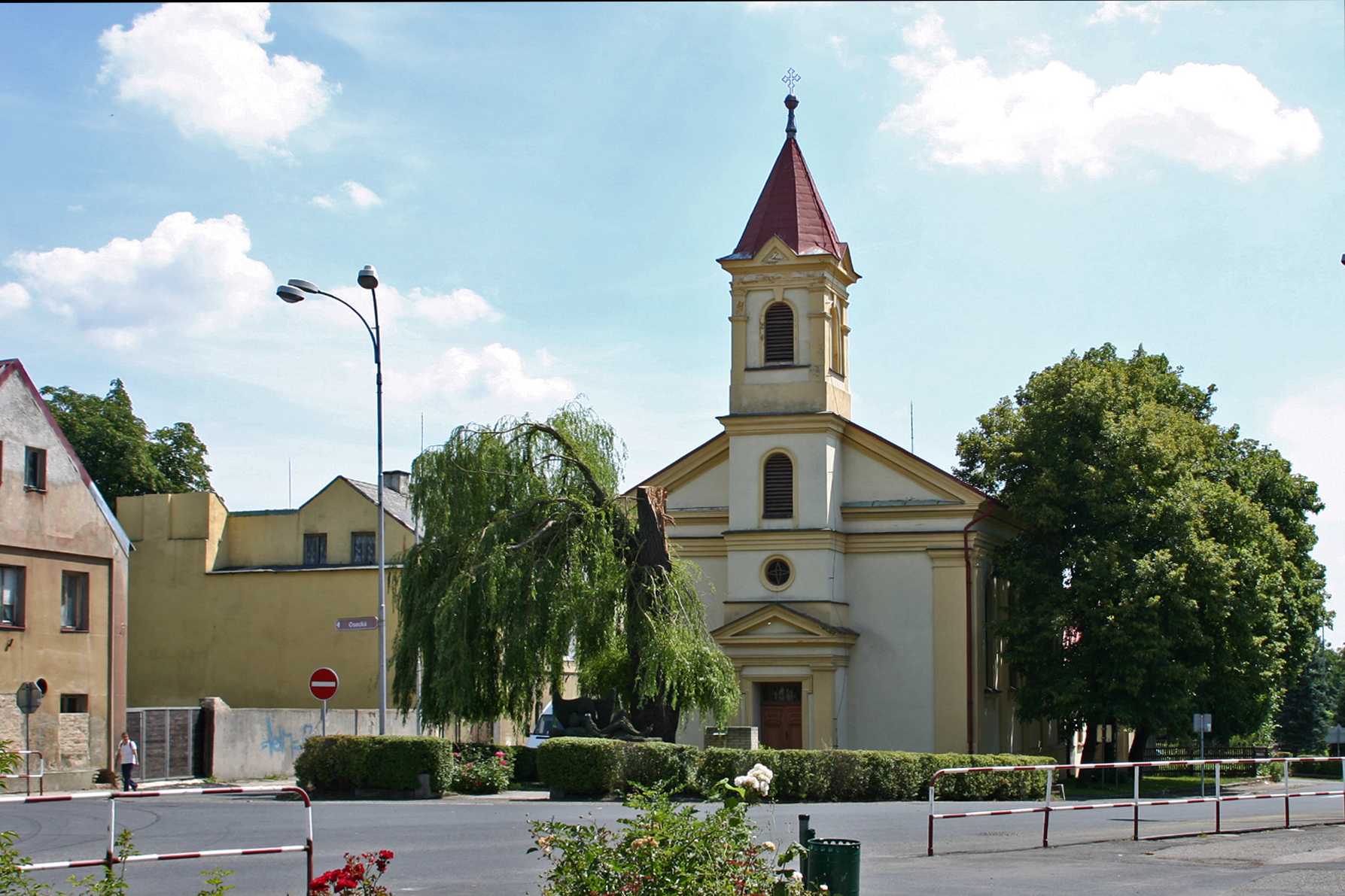
- Church of the Sacred Heart at the town square

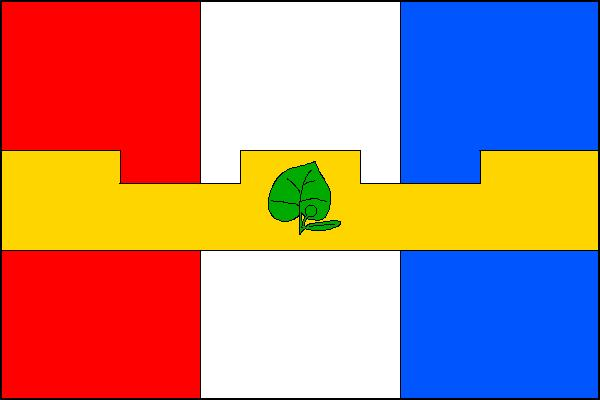
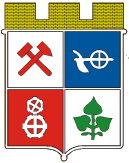
- Flag Coat of arms

- Location in the Czech Republic
- Coordinates: 50°36′2″N 13°39′22″E
- Country: Czech Republic
- Region: Ústí nad Labem
- District: Most
- First mentioned: 1341

Government
  - Mayor: Vladimír Urban

Area
  - Total: 16.80 km^{2} (6.49 sq mi)
- Elevation: 294 m (965 ft)

Population (2026-01-01)
  - Total: 3,755
  - Density: 223.5/km^{2} (578.9/sq mi)
- Time zone: UTC+1 (CET)
  - Summer (DST): UTC+2 (CEST)
- Postal code: 435 11
- Website: www.mesto-lom.cz

Lom (Czech pronunciation: [ˈlom]; German: Bruch) is a town in Most District in the Ústí nad Labem Region of the Czech Republic. It has about 3,800 inhabitants. The town is located on the border between the Most Basin and Ore Mountains.

Lom was founded at the end of the 12th century, but it became a town only in 1938. The main landmark of Lom is the Church of the Sacred Heart.

== Administrative division ==
Lom consists of two municipal parts (in brackets population according to the 2021 census):

- Lom (2,744)
- Loučná (872)

== Etymology ==
The word lom has several meanings in Czech. It can be translated as 'quarry' or 'bend', but in Old Czech, lom was also used for 'crack', 'fight' and 'defeat'.

== Geography ==
Lom is located about 9 kilometres (6 mi) north of Most and 27 km (17 mi) west of Ústí nad Labem. The southern part of the municipal territory with the built-up area lies in the Most Basin and the northern part lies in the Ore Mountains. The highest point is the mountain Loučná at 956 m (3,136 ft) above sea level.

== History ==
The settlement of Lom was established on the road through the Ore Mountains at the end of the 12th century. Until the 17th century, it was focused on agriculture, since then its history is closely connected with mining of iron ore and lignite.

In 1902, Lom became a market town, and in 1938, it became a town. Until 1989, the town was threatened with liquidation due to coal mining. The town gained a new perspective of survival and further development after 1989 with the decision to create a so-called protective pillar on the town's border, to limit and finally to stop further coal mining in this locality.

== Demographics ==
Historical population

Year	Pop.	±%
1869	1,148	—
1880	1,329	+15.8%
1890	2,343	+76.3%
1900	8,475	+261.7%
1910	9,871	+16.5%

Year	Pop.	±%
1921	9,693	−1.8%
1930	10,135	+4.6%
1950	6,151	−39.3%
1961	6,102	−0.8%
1970	4,861	−20.3%

Year	Pop.	±%
1980	4,042	−16.8%
1991	3,214	−20.5%
2001	3,621	+12.7%
2011	3,730	+3.0%
2021	3,616	−3.1%

Source: Censuses

== Transport ==
The I/27 road (the section from Most to Dubí) runs through the town.

Lom is located on the railway line Ústí nad Labem–Litvínov.

== Sights ==
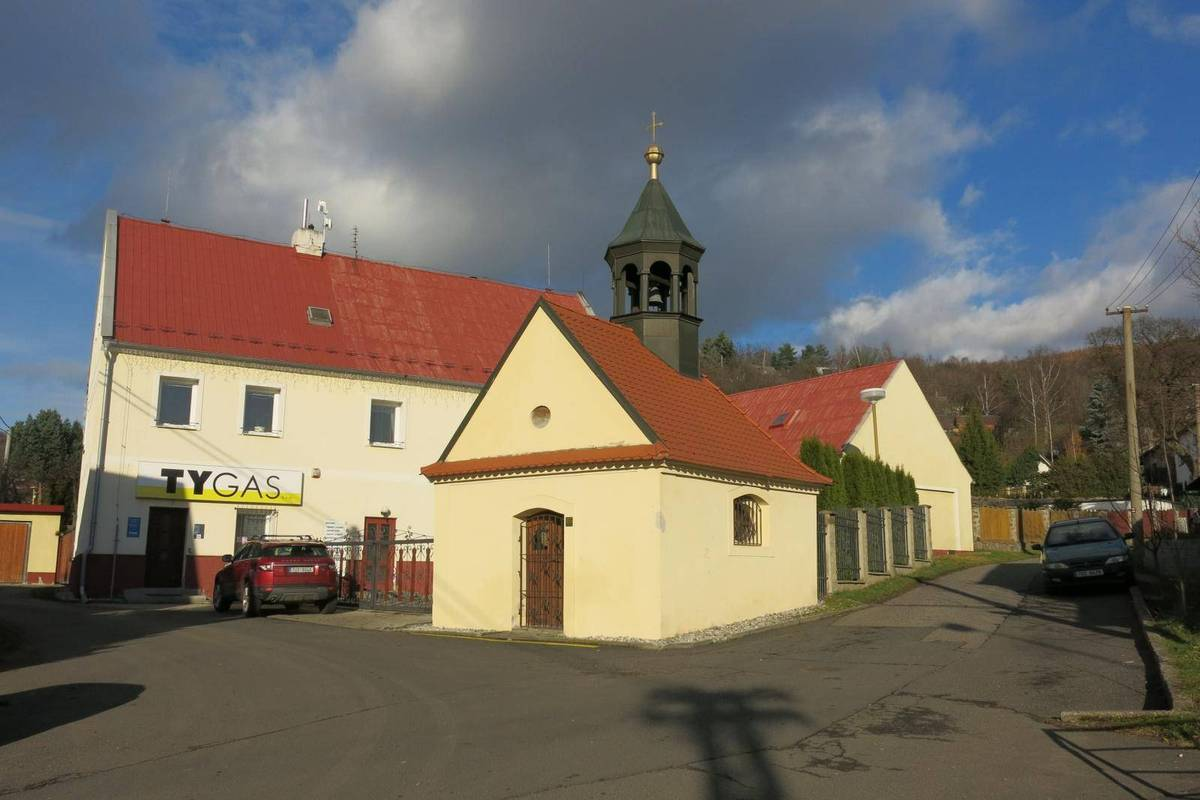
Chapel of the Holy Trinity

The main landmark of Lom is the Church of the Sacred Heart. It was built in the Neo-Renaissance style in 1888.

Other monuments and sights in Lom include a plague column with a pedestal and a relief of St. George from the 15th century, the Chapel of the Holy Trinity from the 1880s, the original mining colony from the end of the 19th century, and a conciliation cross with a crossbow relief from the 13th century.
