= Most District =

Most District Okres Most
- District
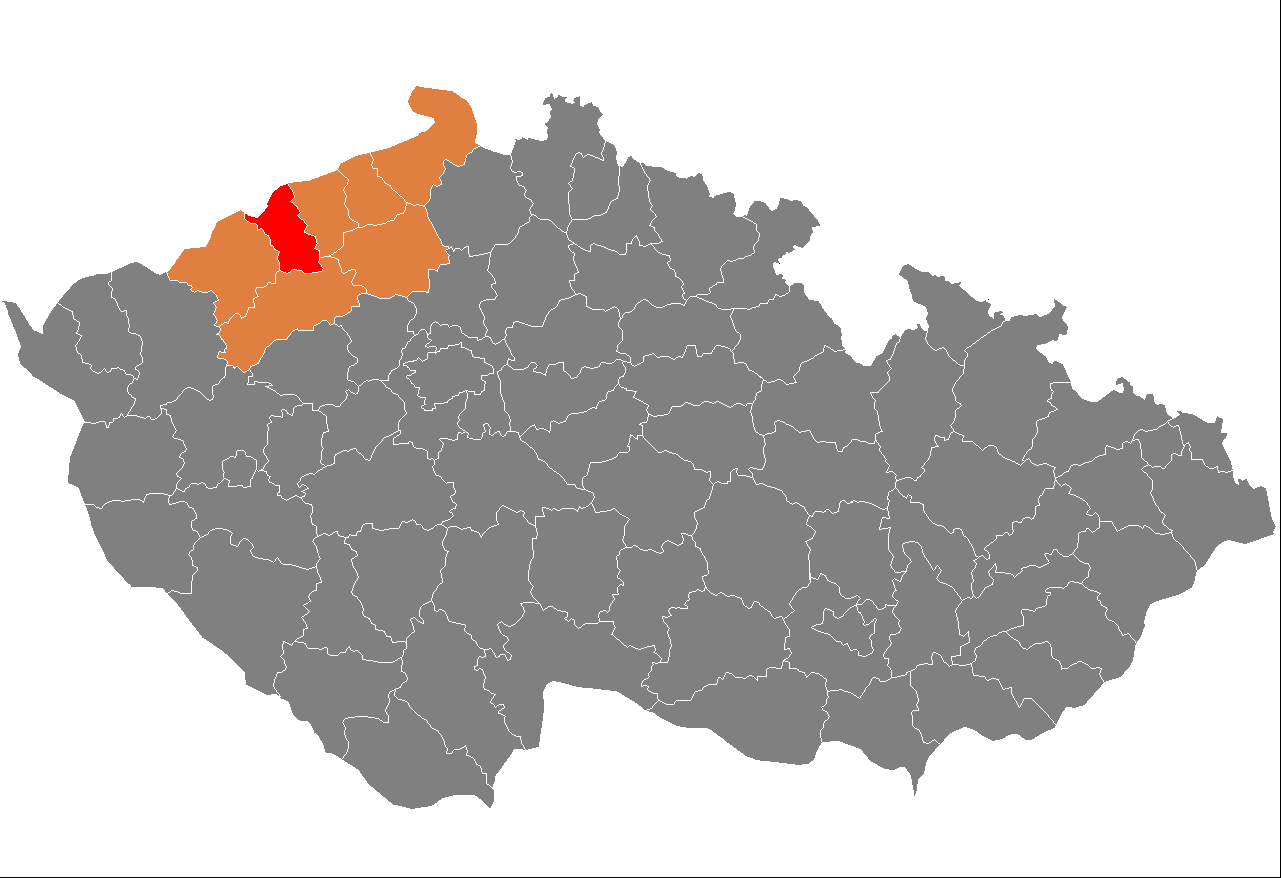
- Location in the Ústí nad Labem Region within the Czech Republic

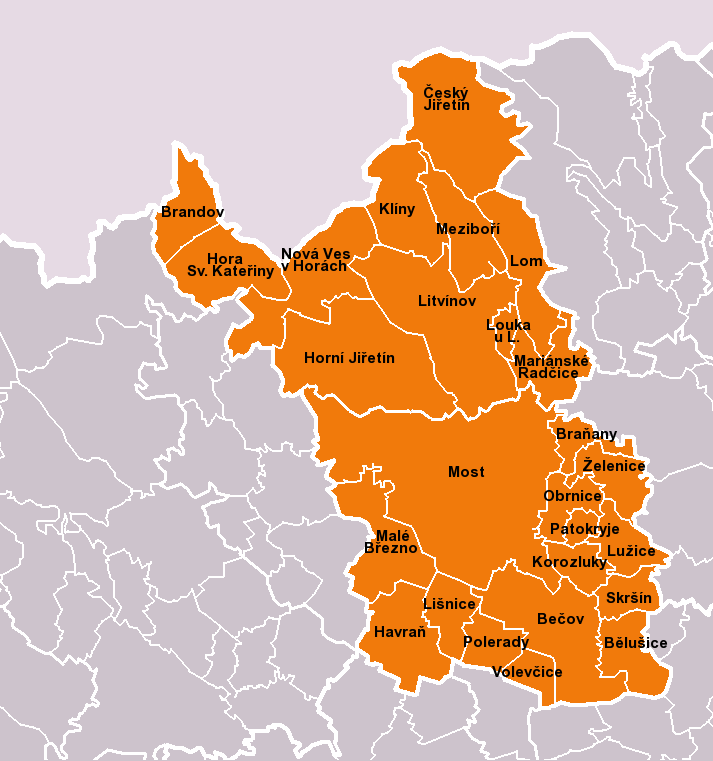
- Coordinates: 50°34′N 13°36′E
- Country: Czech Republic
- Region: Ústí nad Labem
- Capital: Most

Area
  - Total: 467.10 km^{2} (180.35 sq mi)

Population (2026)
  - Total: 107,062
  - Density: 229.21/km^{2} (593.64/sq mi)
- Time zone: UTC+1 (CET)
  - Summer (DST): UTC+2 (CEST)
- Municipalities: 26
- * Cities and towns: 6
- * Market towns: 0

Most District (Czech: okres Most) is a district in the Ústí nad Labem Region of the Czech Republic. Its capital is the city of Most.

== Administrative division ==
Most District is divided into two administrative districts of municipalities with extended competence: Most and Litvínov.

=== List of municipalities ===
Cities and towns are marked in bold:

Bečov - Bělušice - Braňany - Brandov - Český Jiřetín - Havraň - Hora Svaté Kateřiny - Horní Jiřetín - Klíny - Korozluky - Lišnice - Litvínov - Lom - Louka u Litvínova - Lužice - Malé Březno - Mariánské Radčice - Meziboří - Most - Nová Ves v Horách - Obrnice - Patokryje - Polerady - Skršín - Volevčice - Želenice

== Geography ==
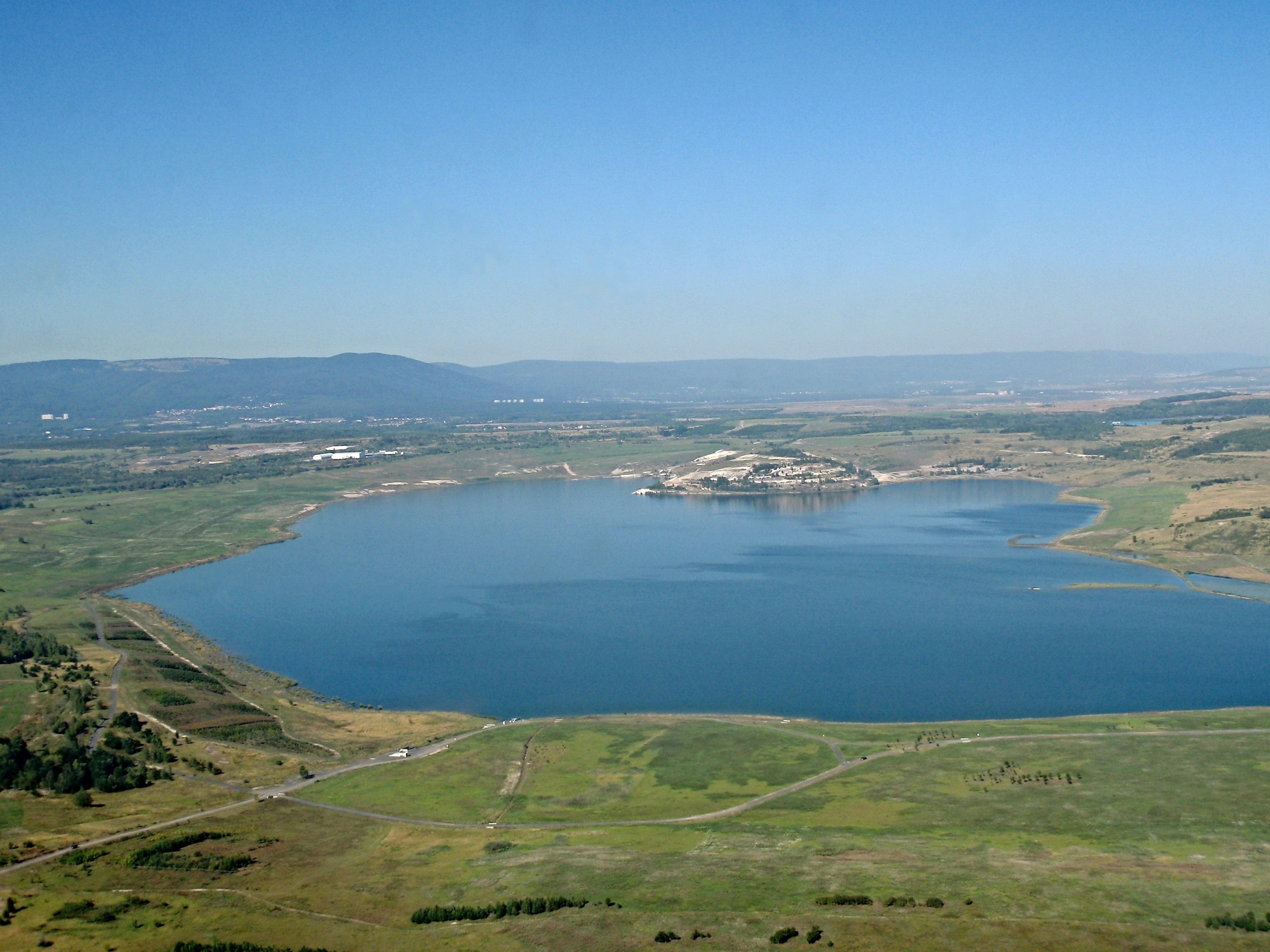
Most Lake

Most District borders Germany in the north. The terrain is very varied and goes from flat in the south to mountainous in the north. The territory extends into three geomorphological mesoregions: Most Basin (southwest and centre), Ore Mountains (north) and Central Bohemian Uplands (southeast). The highest point of the district is the mountain Loučná in Lom with an elevation of 956 m (3,136 ft), the lowest point is the river bed of the Bílina in Želenice at 204 m (669 ft).

From the total district area of 467.1 km^{2} (180.3 sq mi), agricultural land occupies 133.5 km^{2} (51.5 sq mi), forests occupy 161.6 km^{2} (62.4 sq mi), and water area occupies 11.1 km^{2} (4.3 sq mi). Forests cover 34.6% of the district's area.

The most important river is the Bílina, which drains the entire territory. Its most important tributary is the Srpina. The largest body of water is Most Lake, an artificial lake with an area of 309 ha (760 acres). Notable is also Fláje Reservoir with an area of 153 ha (380 acres).

České středohoří is a protected landscape area that extends into the district, with a small part in the southeast of the district.

== Demographics ==
Historical population

Year	Pop.	±%
1869	38,222	—
1880	49,486	+29.5%
1890	65,500	+32.4%
1900	100,808	+53.9%
1910	117,111	+16.2%

Year	Pop.	±%
1921	118,762	+1.4%
1930	127,424	+7.3%
1950	101,199	−20.6%
1961	112,818	+11.5%
1970	117,189	+3.9%

Year	Pop.	±%
1980	117,297	+0.1%
1991	120,212	+2.5%
2001	117,196	−2.5%
2011	111,775	−4.6%
2021	105,165	−5.9%

Source: Censuses

=== Most populous municipalities ===
Name	Population	Area (km^{2})
Most	63,160	87
Litvínov	22,258	41
Meziboří	4,526	14
Lom	3,755	17
Horní Jiřetín	2,153	40
Obrnice	2,048	7
Bečov	1,388	28
Braňany	1,205	6

== Economy ==
The largest employers with headquarters in Most District and at least 500 employees are:

Economic entity	Location	Number of employees	Main activity
Orlen Unipetrol	Litvínov	3,000–3,999	Crude oil processing and manufacture of plastics
Orlen Service Česká republika	Litvínov	500–999	Maintenance and repair of industrial equipment
City of Most	Most	500–999	Public administration
Sev.en Inntech	Most	500–999	Support activities for mining
Vršanská uhelná	Most	500–999	Coal mining

== Transport ==
There are no motorways in the district territory. The most important road that passes through the district is the I/13 from Karlovy Vary to Liberec.

== Sights ==
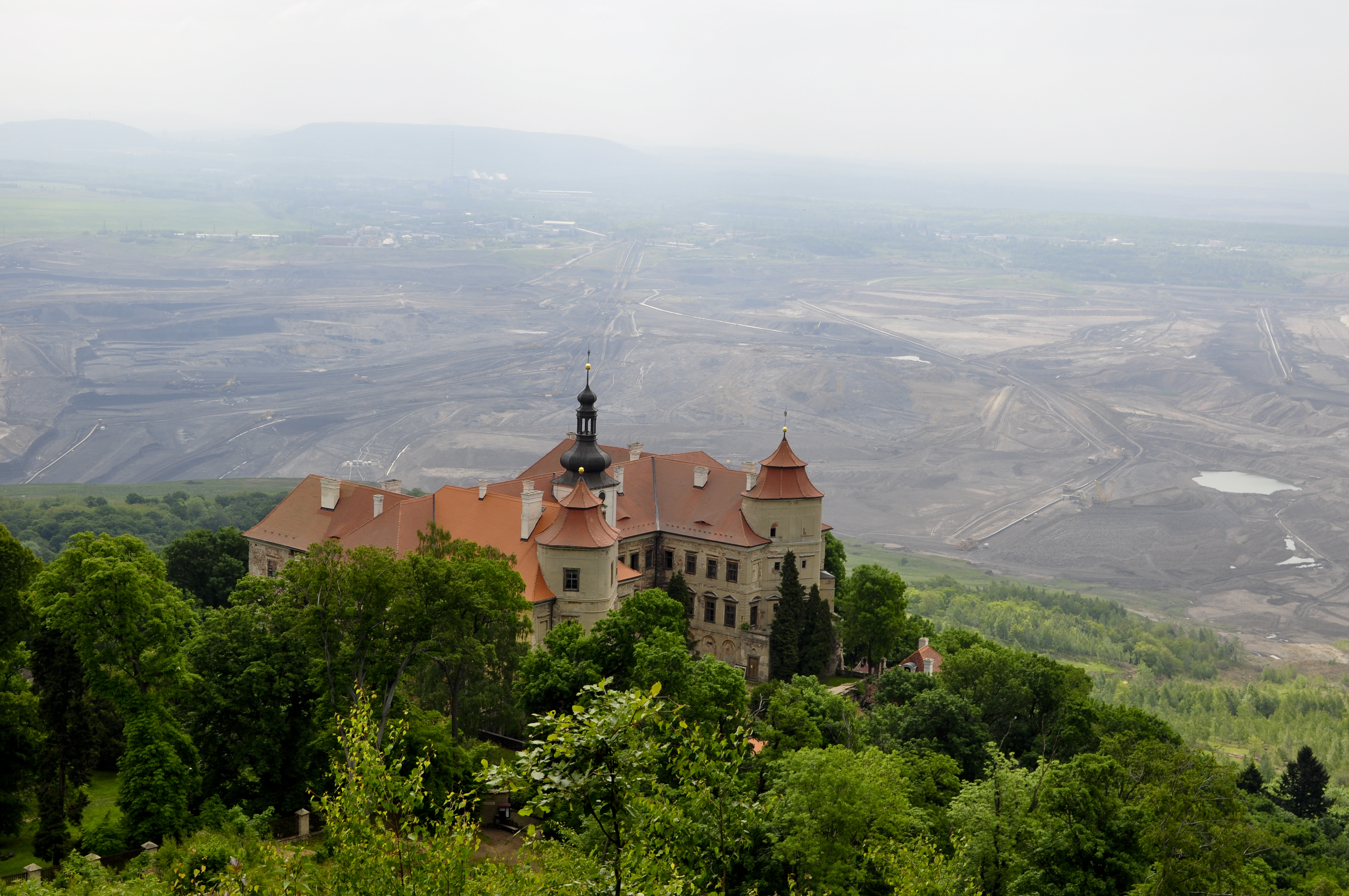
Jezeří Castle above a lignite mine

The most important monuments in the district, protected as national cultural monuments, are:

- Church of the Assumption of the Virgin Mary in Most
- Jezeří Castle in Horní Jiřetín

The best-preserved settlement, which is the only one protected as a monument zone, is Litvínov-Osada.

The most visited tourist destination is the Jezeří Castle.
