= Malé Březno (Most District) =

- Municipality
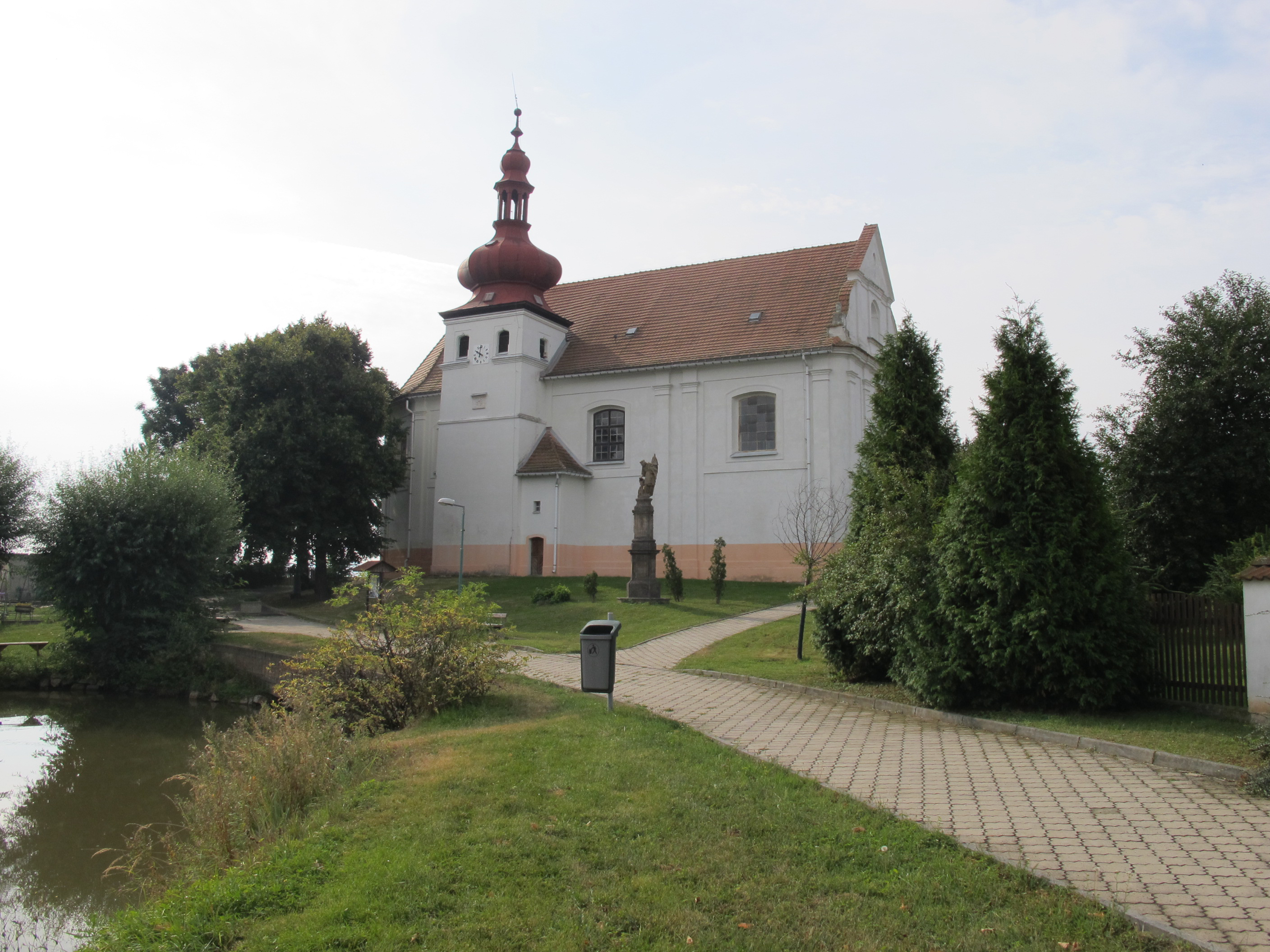
- Church of Saint John the Evangelist

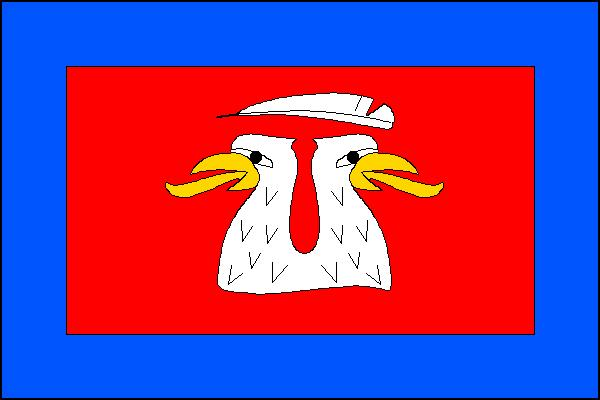
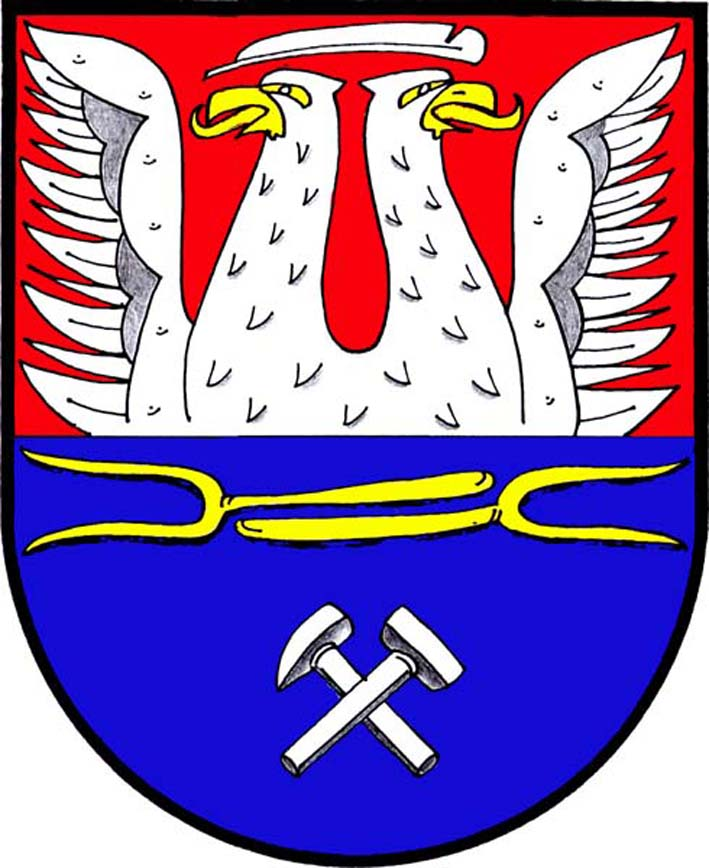
- Flag Coat of arms

- Location in the Czech Republic
- Coordinates: 50°27′45″N 13°33′37″E
- Country: Czech Republic
- Region: Ústí nad Labem
- District: Most
- First mentioned: 1369

Area
  - Total: 19.09 km^{2} (7.37 sq mi)
- Elevation: 246 m (807 ft)

Population (2026-01-01)
  - Total: 255
  - Density: 13.4/km^{2} (34.6/sq mi)
- Time zone: UTC+1 (CET)
  - Summer (DST): UTC+2 (CEST)
- Postal code: 434 01
- Website: www.male-brezno.cz

Malé Březno (German: Kleinpriesen) is a municipality and village in Most District in the Ústí nad Labem Region of the Czech Republic. It has about 300 inhabitants.

Malé Březno lies approximately 6 kilometres (4 mi) south-west of Most, 40 km (25 mi) south-west of Ústí nad Labem, and 75 km (47 mi) north-west of Prague.

== Administrative division ==
Malé Březno consists of two municipal parts (in brackets population according to the 2021 census):

- Malé Březno (195)
- Vysoké Březno (30)

== Demographics ==
Historical population
| Year | Pop. | ±% |
|---|---|---|
| 1869 | 946 | — |
| 1880 | 1,171 | +23.8% |
| 1890 | 1,331 | +13.7% |
| 1900 | 1,488 | +11.8% |
| 1910 | 1,770 | +19.0% |
| 1921 | 1,838 | +3.8% |
| 1930 | 1,929 | +5.0% |
| 1950 | 1,253 | −35.0% |
| 1961 | 1,183 | −5.6% |
| 1970 | 952 | −19.5% |
| 1980 | 175 | −81.6% |
| 1991 | 164 | −6.3% |
| 2001 | 184 | +12.2% |
| 2011 | 212 | +15.2% |
| 2021 | 225 | +6.1% |
Source: Censuses
