= Osek (Teplice District) =

- Town
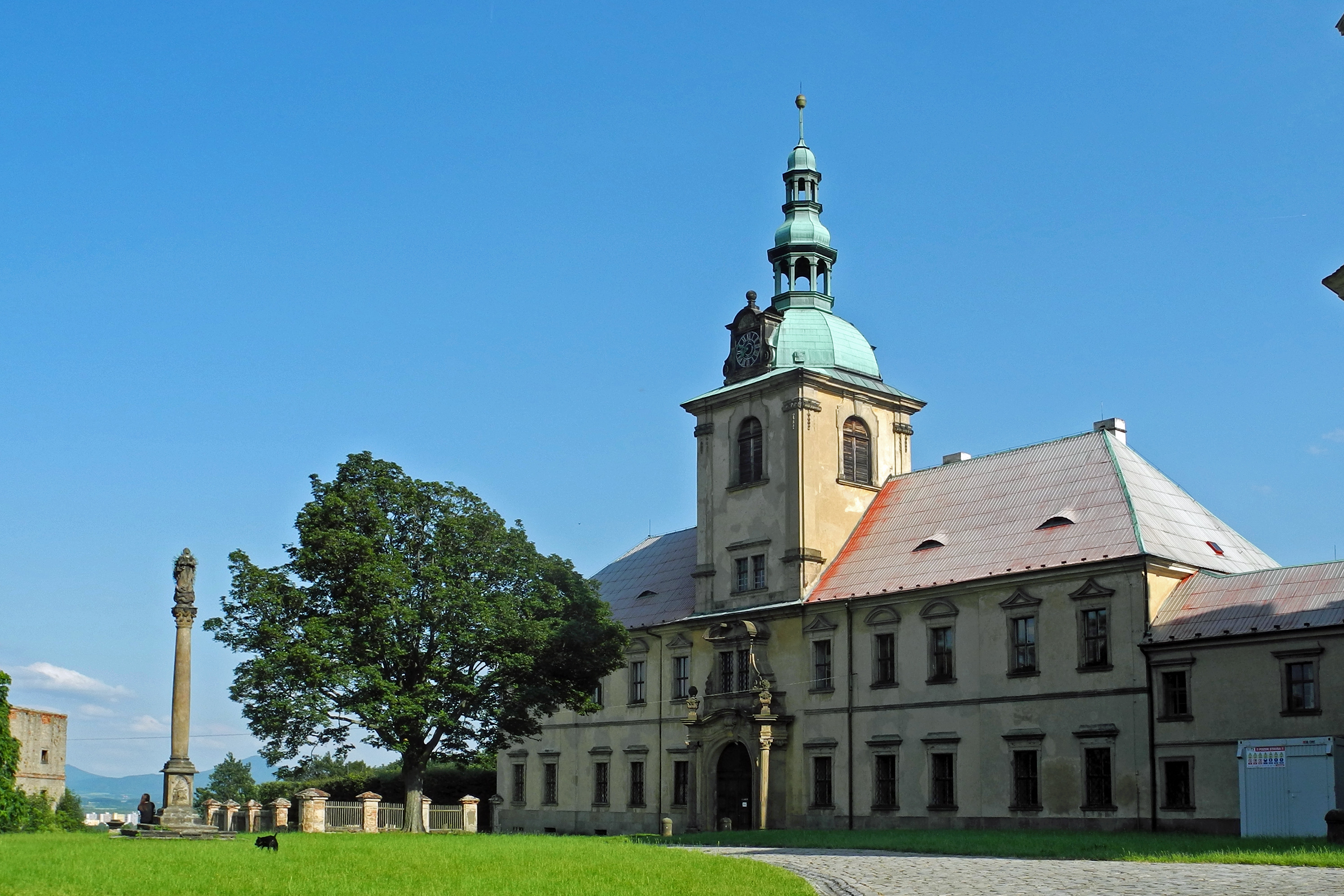
- Osek Monastery

- Flag Coat of arms

- Location in the Czech Republic
- Coordinates: 50°37′22″N 13°41′9″E
- Country: Czech Republic
- Region: Ústí nad Labem
- District: Teplice
- Founded: 1196

Government
  - Mayor: Jiří Macháček

Area
  - Total: 42.37 km^{2} (16.36 sq mi)
- Elevation: 307 m (1,007 ft)

Population (2026-01-01)
  - Total: 4,506
  - Density: 106.3/km^{2} (275.4/sq mi)
- Time zone: UTC+1 (CET)
  - Summer (DST): UTC+2 (CEST)
- Postal code: 417 05
- Website: www.osek.cz

Osek (Czech pronunciation: [ˈosɛk]; German: Ossegg) is a town in Teplice District in the Ústí nad Labem Region of the Czech Republic. It has about 4,500 inhabitants. The town is located on the stream Osecký potok, on the border between the Most Basin and Ore Mountains.

Osek was founded in 1196 together with the Osek Monastery. The development of the town has been linked to mining since the Middle Ages, and in 1934 the worst mining accident in the country's history occurred here. The most important monuments, protected as national cultural monuments, are the Osek Monastery and the memorial to the victims of the Nelson Mine disaster.

== Administrative division ==
Osek consists of three municipal parts (in brackets population according to the 2021 census):

- Osek (4,448)
- Dlouhá Louka (24)
- Hrad Osek (60)

== Etymology ==
Osek is a common Czech toponym. The Czech word osek denotes a cut trunk, but it also could mean a cut forest.

== Geography ==
Osek is located about 9 kilometres (6 mi) west of Teplice and 24 kilometres (15 mi) west of Ústí nad Labem. The municipal territory briefly borders Germany. The southern part of the territory with the built-up area lies in the Most Basin and the northern part lies in the Ore Mountains. The highest point is the mountain Vlčí hora at 891 m (2,923 ft) above sea level. The stream Osecký potok flows through the town.

Salesiova výšina is a rock city of huge quartzite blocks, pillars and fissures west of the town proper. It is protected as a nature monument.

== History ==
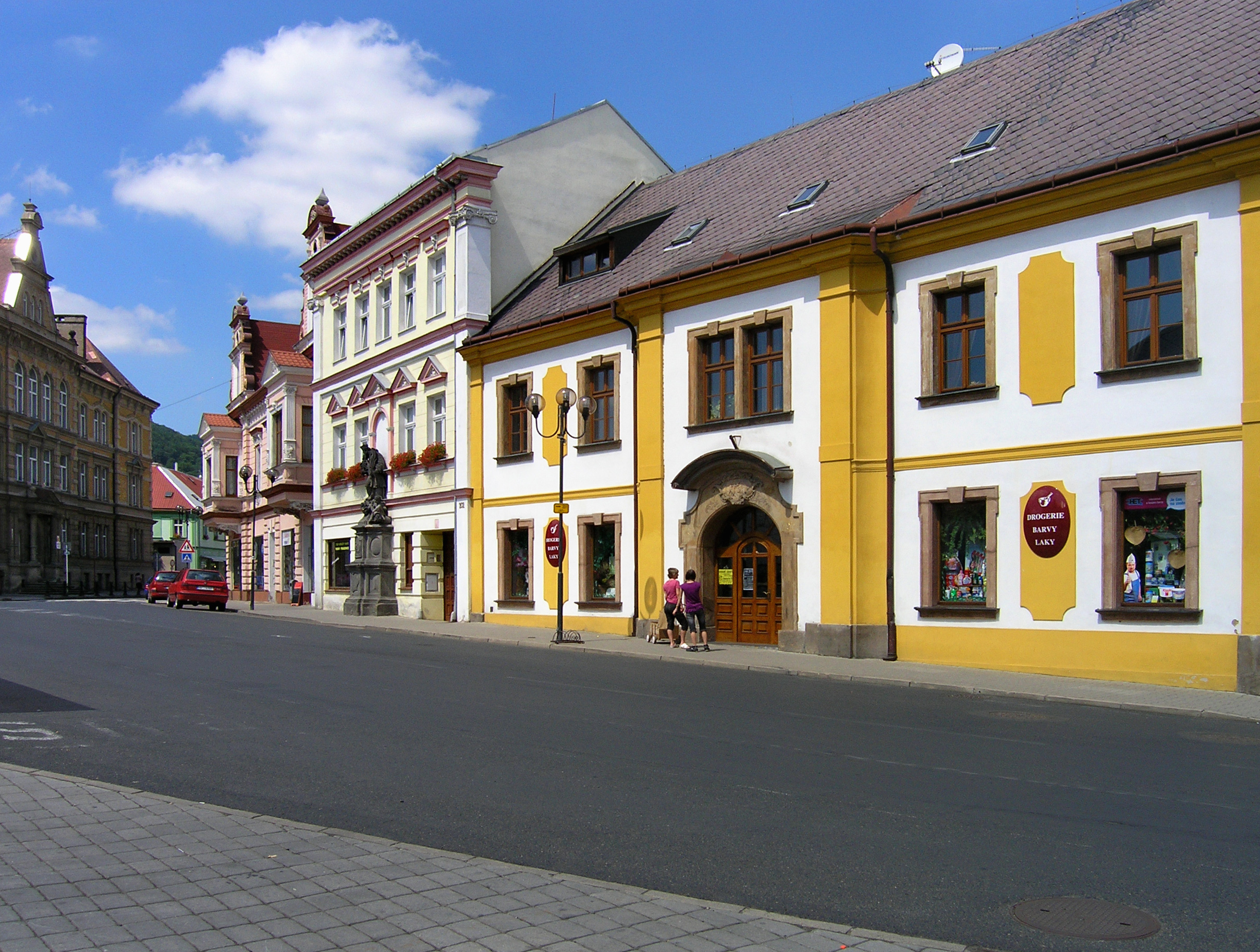
The square Klášterní náměstí

The history of the area is closely connected with the Osek Monastery. Between 1196 and 1197, Cistercian monks arrived from Mašťov and founded the monastery. The monastery complex grew over time to become the economic and social hub of the region. In 1278, it was looted by Brandenburg troops.

The village of Osek was founded shortly before the monastery. Until the early 14th century, the inhabitants of the village made a living mainly by cattle breeding. In the 14th century, mining of silver and tin developed.

In 1421 and then again in 1429, the monastery was burned down by the Hussites and many monks were killed. The property of the monastery was gradually dismantled, and in 1580 it was abolished by Emperor Rudolf II. Osek was acquired by the Prague archbishopric and the monks were forced to leave for Zbraslav Monastery. The dissolution of the monastery was annulled in 1614 by Pope Paul V. During the Thirty Years' War, the Osek estate was confiscated by Protestants and sold to several buyers. In 1626, the monastery was returned to the Cistercians and began to regain its glory, which fully developed in the 18th century.

On 3 January 1934, the worst mining disaster in the country's history occurred in the territory of Osek. As a result on an explosion, 144 people died at the Nelson III mine.

The monastery was abolished in 1950 and restored in 1991.

== Demographics ==
Historical population

Year	Pop.	±%
1869	2,922	—
1880	4,583	+56.8%
1890	6,928	+51.2%
1900	9,894	+42.8%
1910	11,094	+12.1%

Year	Pop.	±%
1921	11,124	+0.3%
1930	11,755	+5.7%
1950	7,367	−37.3%
1961	7,259	−1.5%
1970	5,950	−18.0%

Year	Pop.	±%
1980	5,960	+0.2%
1991	5,194	−12.9%
2001	5,030	−3.2%
2011	4,800	−4.6%
2021	4,532	−5.6%

Source: Censuses

== Transport ==
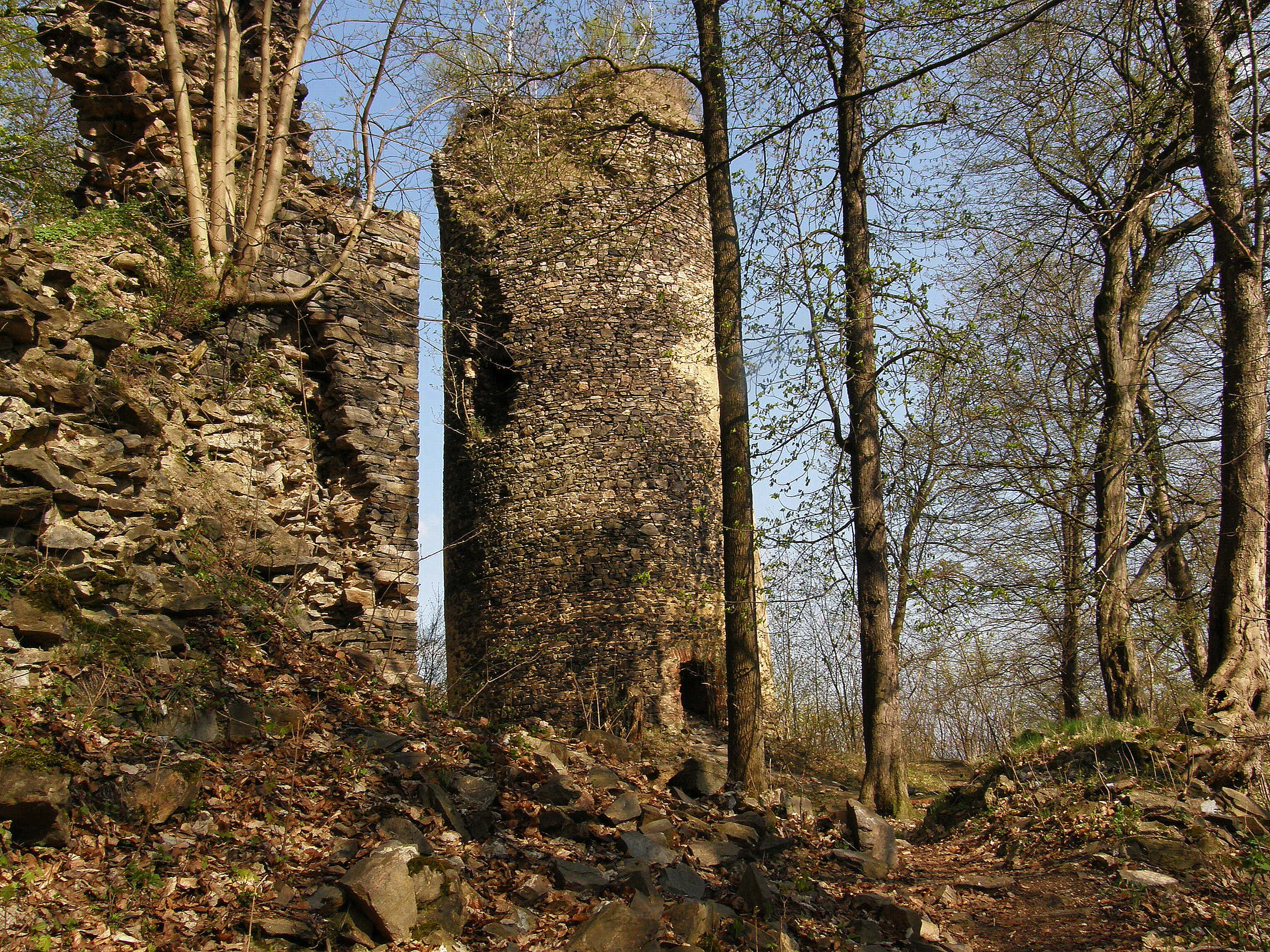
Rýzmburk Castle

Osek is located on the railway line heading from Děčín and Ústí nad Labem to Litvínov.

== Culture ==
Osek Festival is an annual event with fairground markets, demonstrations of traditional crafts and funfair attractions.

== Sights ==
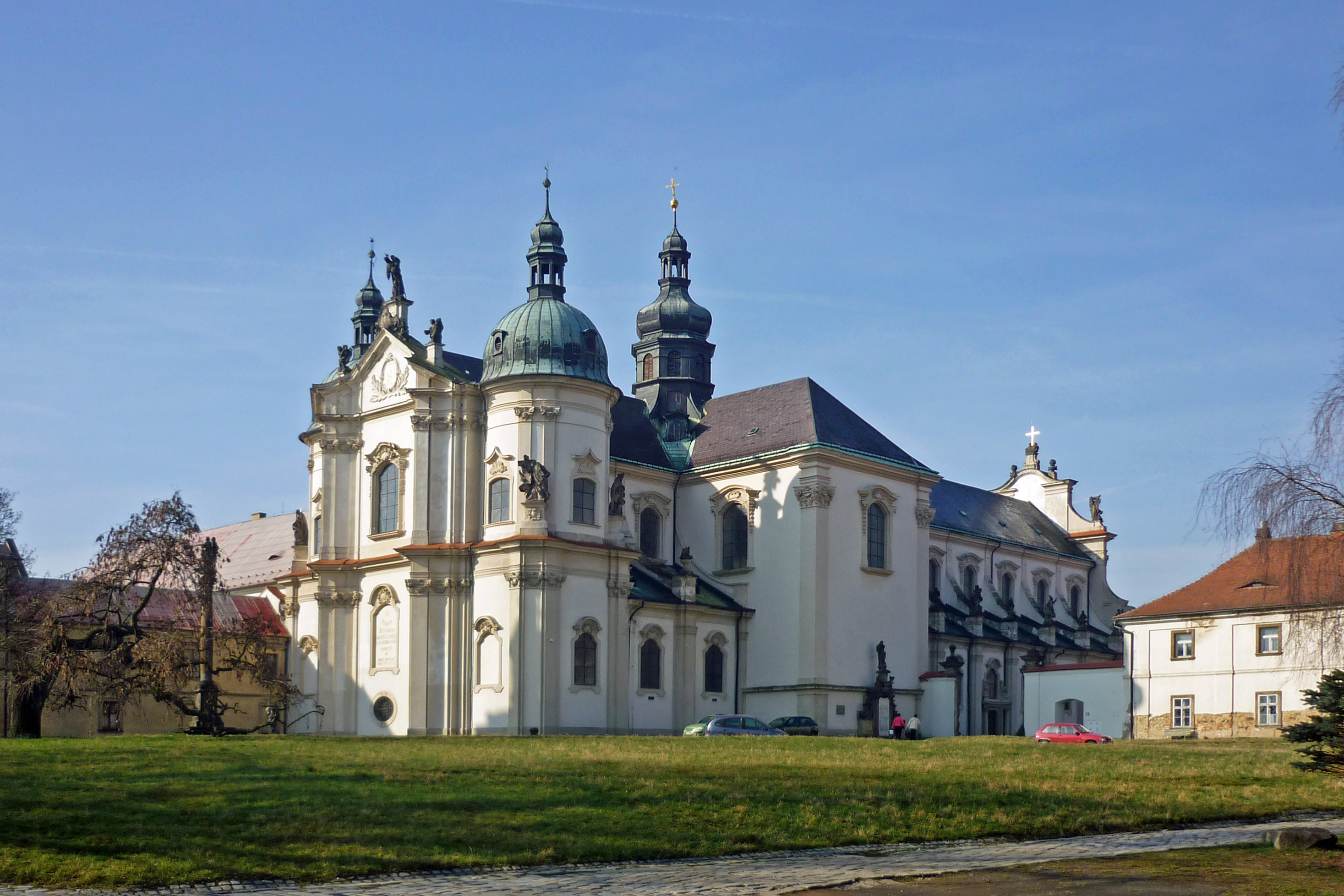
Church of the Assumption of the Virgin Mary

The main landmark is the Osek Monastery. It is an extensive complex of buildings, built from the Romanesque to the Baroque era. The main reconstruction into its current Baroque appearance took place in 1712–1718, when it was rebuilt by the architect Octavio Broggio. The interior of the monastery Church of the Assumption of the Virgin Mary was decorated by painters Václav Vavřinec Reiner, Jan Kryštof Liška and Michael Willmann and sculptors Franz Anton Kern and Giacomo Antonio Corbellini. The monastery complex is protected as a national cultural monument.

The ruin of the medieval Rýzmburk (formerly Riesenburg) Castle is located northwest of the town proper. It belonged to its founders, the noble Rýzmburk family until 1398; the ownership then shifted to the margraves of Meissen. The castle was built shortly before 1250. It was abandoned in 1538 and fell into disrepair. It was one of the strongest fortresses in Bohemia that was probably never conquered. It has two parts, the first one is the core with residential towers and a chapel, and the second one is a large complex surrounded by a wall with shooting turrets, dominated by a massive bergfried. Today it is freely accessible.

A reverent area, which was designated a national cultural monument, is the memorial to the victims of the Nelson Mine disaster. The main feature of the memorial is a larger-than-life sculpture of an elderly man and a grieving woman looking into a filled-in grave. It was created by the sculptor Karel Pokorný in 1935.

== Notable people ==
- Karl Lieffen (1926–1999), German actor
- Kamil Střihavka (born 1965), singer
