= Hrabišici =

The Hrabišici (singular: Hrabišic; German: Hrabischitz) were a North Bohemian aristocratic family, that was also known as the lords of Osek or of Osek and Riesenburg (Czech: z Oseka) but were also named von Riesenburg after their castle, the Riesenburg. The history of the family goes back to the 11th century. The family fell on hard times in the 15th century and died out in the early 16th century.

== Genealogy of important members of the line of Riesenburg and Osek ==
=== Not fully traced ===
1. Všebor I (died before 1061), was presumably an important figure in Bohemia at that time. From the papers of King Vratislav II it can be inferred that a certain Všebor gifted the village of Lodín to Břevnov Monastery.
  1. Všebor II (died before 1073)
    1. Kojata, is mentioned in the years 1061 to 1068 as governor of the castle of Bílina and the district of Bilina. In the following 35 years there are no more entries in the historic documents about other individuals.
      1. Hrabeš the Great also Hrabeš I (died 1158), was from 1103 to 1109 Great Chamberlain of Bořivoj II, Duke of Bohemia
        1. Unknown member of the House of Hrabischitz
          1. Heralt Gerardus (died 1122) (for continuation see “Traced genealogies”)
          2. Vschebor III de Vinarec, mentioned 1172
          3. Grabissa II (Hrabiš II), von 1180 to at the latest 1183 Great Chamberlain (born about 1120; (died 6 November 1197)
          4. Kojata III, Vizekämmerer 1185–1187
            1. Olen, mentioned 1121
            2. Boresch (Boreš), mentioned 1091
            3. Olen, mentioned vor 1091

=== Traced genealogies ===
1. Heralt Gerardus or Kojata III
  1. Grabissa III (Hrabiš III) (died 1197), höchster Kämmerer 1188–1189, and 1191–1197
    1. Grabissa IV (Hrabiš IV) (died about 1197)
    2. Kojata IV also Kojata of Brüx (Kojata z Mostu) (died 1228), 1207 mentioned as Unterkellner, married Vratislava
    3. Vschebor IV (of Schwabenitz), also Svebor von Schwabenitz, Všebor IV ze Švábenic (died about 1224), mentioned from 1190
      1. Svatochna, mentioned 1234–1258, married Slavibor of Drnovice
      2. Euphemie (Eufémie), mentioned from 1232 to 1268
  2. Slauko der Große (Slávek Veliký also Slávek I) (died 1226). At the end of the 12th century he authorised the foundation of the Cistercian abbey of Ossegg.
    1. Grabissa V (Hrabiš V), mentioned 1197–1203
    2. Bohuslav I of Hrabišic (born about 1180; died 1241), Königlicher Kämmerer
      1. Slauko III (Slavek III) (died before 28 February 1250 in Ossegg) (1234 to 1240 Abbot of Ossegg, then until 1249 Abbot of Prussia with seat in Marienwerder)
      2. Boreš of Rýzmburk (also Bohuslav II de Riesenburg) (born about 1201; died before 1278)
  3. Boresch I (Boreš I) (died before 1207, mentioned 1188
    1. Slauko II (Slavek II), mentioned 1207–1209
    2. Odolen, mentioned 1224–1238
      1. Bohuslav, mentioned 1232–1234
        1. Odolen of Chyše (Odolen von Chiesch), mentioned 1254–1289

== Literature ==
- 800 let klástera vo Oseku (1196–1996)
- Velímský, Tomáš: Hrabišici páni z Rýzmburka ISBN 80-7106-498-X
