= Boresch III of Ossegg and Riesenburg =

Boresch III of Ossegg and Riesenburg (died before 1312) was a Bohemian aristocrat of the House of Riesenburg.

The son of Boresch II (also Bohuslav II) was a member of the regional court (Landgericht) in 1291. At the end of the 13th century ore mining flourished on the Riesenburg estates. On 22 March 1302 he signed a treaty with the abbot of Ossegg, wherein he agreed to share the mining profits with Osek Abbey.

Following the death of King Wenceslaus II and the murder of his successor, Wenceslaus III one year later, a new wave of violence swept through Bohemia, as the powerful princes attempted to extend their estates and wealth during the interregnum. Church assets were seized, but attempts were also made to rectify the injustices of the past.

Boresch, too, could not resist further extending his power. In 1307 he was named as the owner of Sayda, this time however not as part of the Bohemian Empire but as an enfeoffment from the Margraviate of Meissen.

He was only mentioned once more before his death. In the treaty documents of 1312 his name no longer appears.
