= Jan Kryštof Liška =

Czech Baroque painter

- Born: c. 1650; Wrocław, Silesia, Crown of Bohemia (now Poland)
- Died: 23 August 1712 (aged c. 62); Lubiąż, Silesia, Crown of Bohemia (now Poland)
- Known for: Painting
- Movement: Baroque

Jan Kryštof Liška (German: Johann Christoph Lischka; C. 1650 – 23 August 1712) was a Czech Baroque painter. His works mainly included altarpieces and frescoes.

== Life ==
=== Early life ===
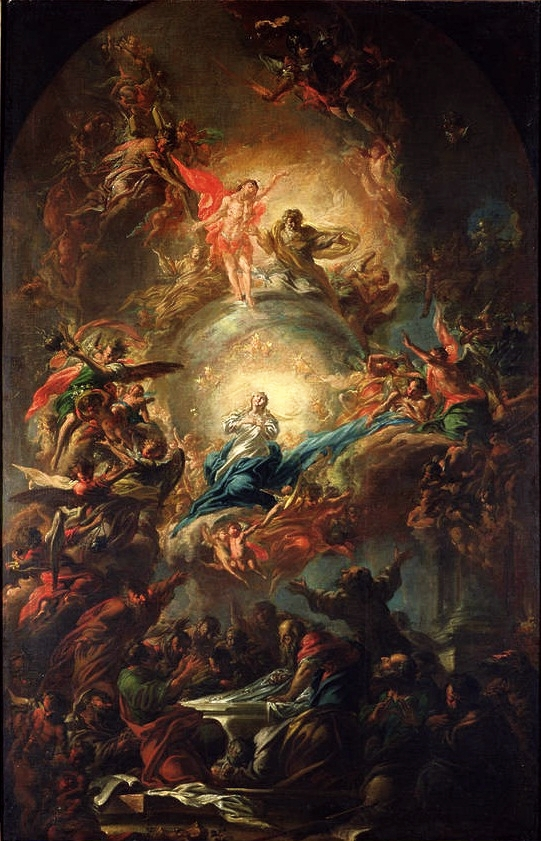
Assumption of Mary (1696). National Gallery in Prague

Born in Wrocław (Breslau), Silesia, into a noble family of Moravian knights. After his father died, his mother Helena remarried and he became stepson to German painter Michael Willmann. Young Liška with his stepfather formed a close relationship and cooperation between the Liška and Wilmann families was maintained for years. Willmann enabled him to complete a study tour of Italy between 1674 and 1680.

=== Career ===
Since 1689 Liška worked mainly, besides his native Silesia, in Bohemia proper – especially in Prague although there he had lifelong disputes with local artist's guild, while he lived in the shadow of his famous stepfather (thus sometimes nicknamed "Willmann, Jr."). When his stepfather died in 1706, his studio in the Cistercian Lubiąż Abbey (Silesia) initially went to his son. But because Willmann's son died only one year later, the studio then went to Liška, who then managed it until 1712. For the rest of his life he obtained contracts from the monastery together with some other Silesian Cistercian monasteries.

He died on 23 August 1712 in Lubiąż (Leubus).

== Works ==
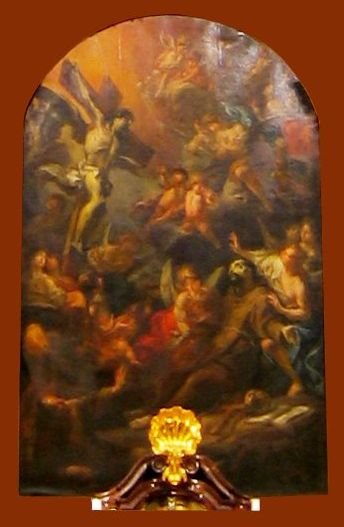
Stigmata of St. Francis (1701). Altarpiece in the Church of St. Francis of Assisi, Prague

In Prague he worked on the altarpiece painting for the St. Nicholas Church. Among his best known works include the altarpiece Stigmata of St. Francis (1701) located in the Red Star Crusaders' motherhouse church in the Old Town. For this church he also painted the Assumption of Mary and worked on the frescoes, which were later finished by Reiner. Moreover, the Saint Anne altarpiece at the Strahov Monastery was also done by him.

Outside of Prague received orders from various Cistercian monasteries in Bohemia. For example, in the Doksany Convent he painted St. Augustine, at the monastery in Mnichovo Hradiště (Münchengrätz) he painted St. Anthony, St. Francis and the Three Kings. For the Plasy Monastery painted fresco St. Magdalene (1692) while in main church of the Osek Monastery is situated his altarpiece Decapitation of St. Paul (1695).

As for Silesia, in Wroclaw he painted a picture for the Church of the Holy Cross. For the Henryków Monastery he painted a picture of the Mother of God, God the Father and the Holy Spirit. In Kamieniec Ząbkowicki (Kamenz) in the Church of the Assumption he painted the images Death of St. Benedict and St. Scholastica During the Coronation (1708).

Liška's influence is evident particularly in works of his disciple, fresco painter Václav Vavřinec Reiner, it also can be traced at style of Petr Brandl.
