= Osek Monastery =

Cistercian monastery in the Czech Republic

- Osecký klášter
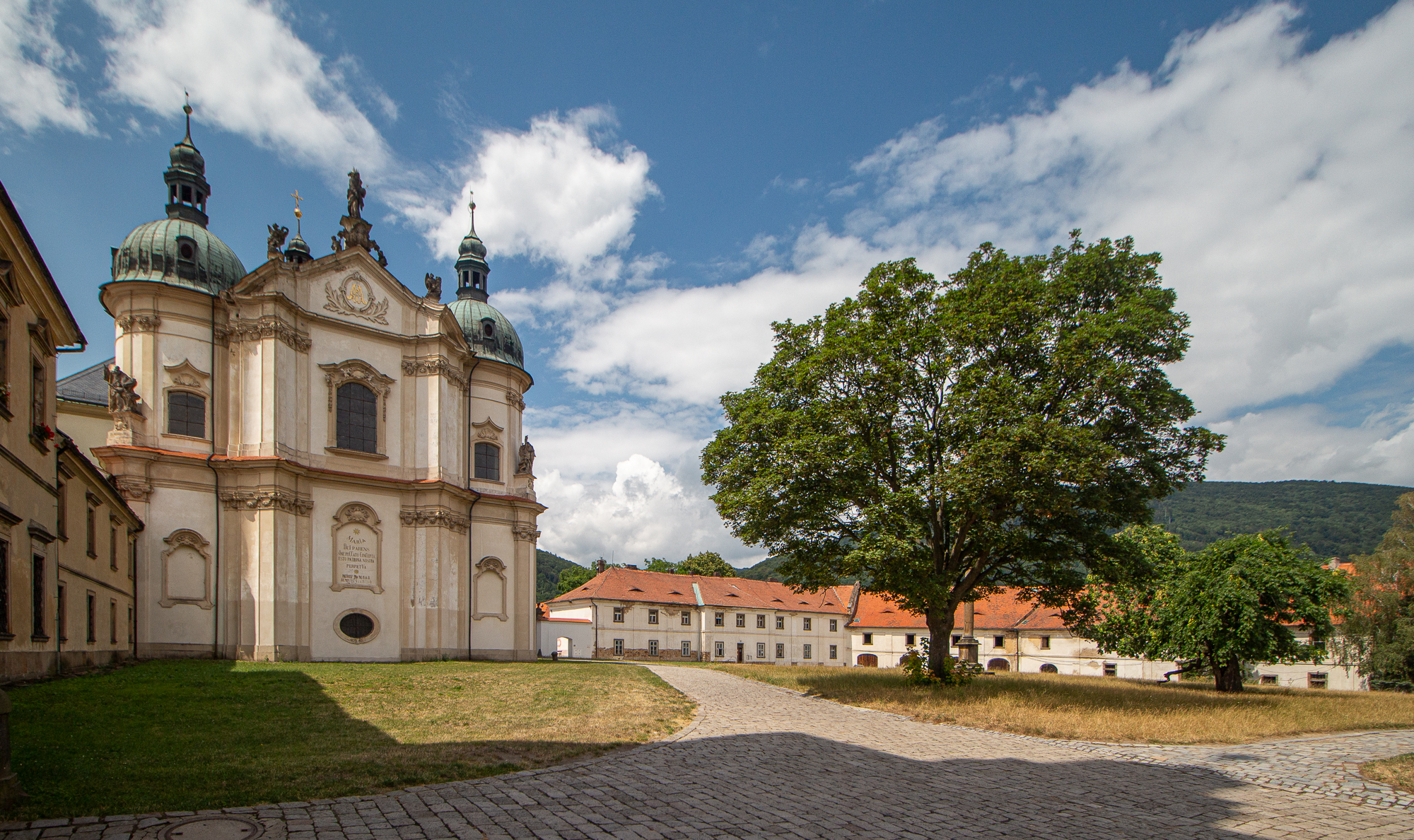

- Location within Czech Republic

Monastery information
- Order: Cistercians
- Established: 1199; 1626 (reestablished); 1991 (reestabilished)
- Disestablished: 1580; 1945 (1950)
- Mother house: Waldsassen Abbey
- Diocese: Litoměřice

People
- Abbot: vacant

Architecture
- Heritage designation: National cultural monument
- Style: Romanesque, Gothic, Baroque

Site
- Location: Osek, Czech Republic
- Coordinates: 50°37′14″N 13°41′38″E
- Website: klasterosek.cz

Osek Monastery (Czech: Osecký klášter; German: Kloster Ossegg) is a Cistercian monastery in Osek in Ústí nad Labem Region of the Czech Republic. Originally built in the 13th century as a Romanesque-Gothic structure, it was transformed into the high-Baroque style during the early 18th century, giving it the today's appearance. The monastery complex comprises the Church of Assumption of Virgin Mary, the building of the convent, the abbot's residence (prelature) with a clock tower, and several auxiliary buildings.

== History ==
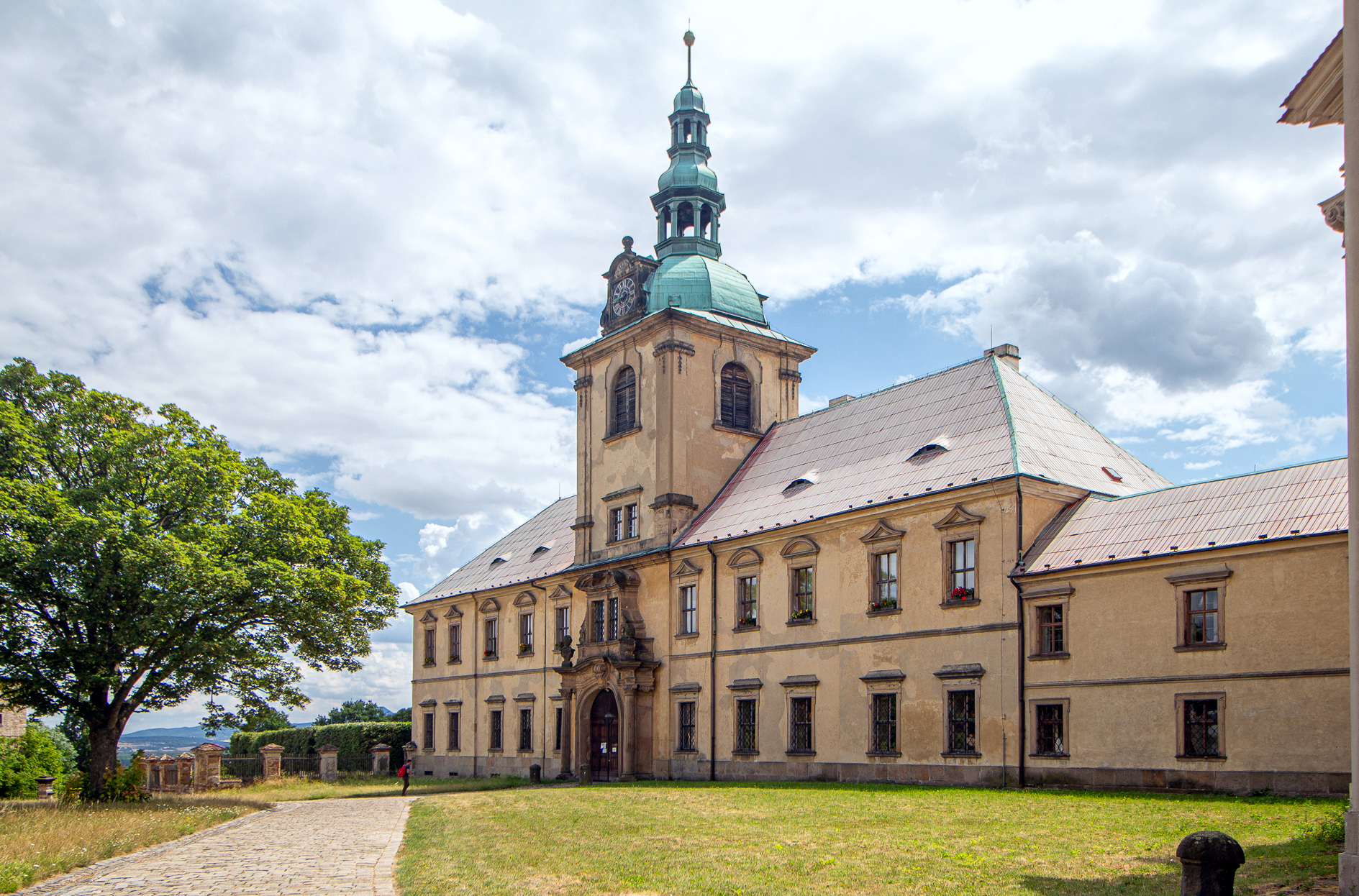
Prelature (abbot's house)

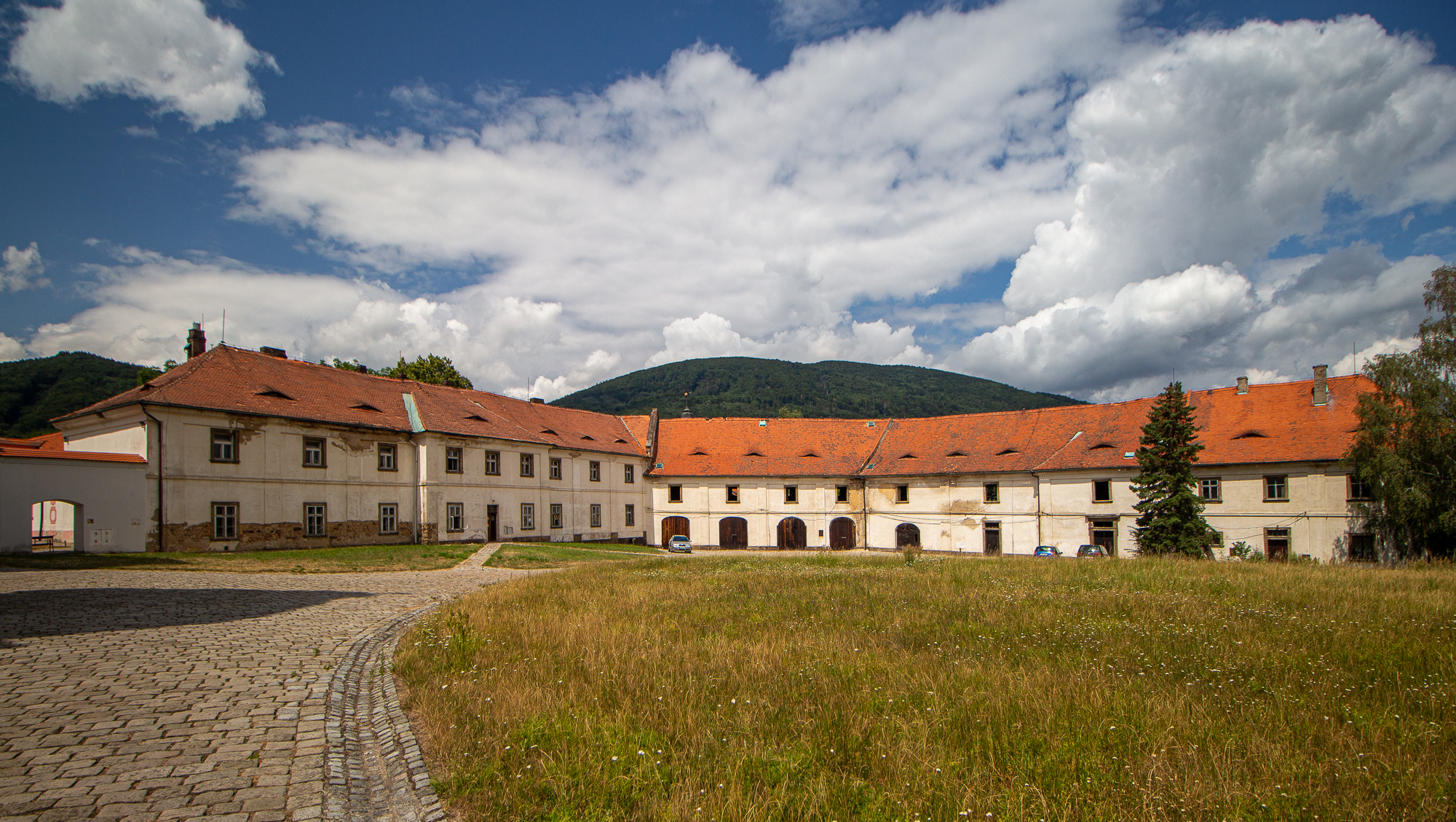
Auxiliary buildings with the Ossegg Brewery

=== Founding and early history ===
The Osek Monastery was founded by a Czech nobleman called Milhošť who invited Cistercian monks from the Bavarian Waldsassen Abbey to his manor in Mašťov at the end of the 12th century. However, the monastery struggled financially, as Milhošť diverted its income for his own use. Consequently, the monks relocated to Osek in 1198 with the support of Slávek of the Hrabišici family, the chamberlain of King Ottokar I. Slávek and his heirs later moved to Riesenburg Castle above Osek, thus they were later called the lords of Riesenburg.

The abbey flourished during the first half of the 13th century, even attempting to establish a daughter abbey in Nížkov, though unsuccessfully. The abbey suffered during a rebellion by the future Czech King Ottokar II, who sacked it due to its association with the Riesenburg family. In 1260, Boreš II of Riesenburg gifted the abbey a relic of a finger of St. John the Baptist.

=== Royal abbey ===
In the 14th century, King John of Bohemia made Osek a royal abbey. It prospered until the Hussite Wars when Prague's Hussite armies burned it in 1421. Most monks escaped to Altzella Abbey, but Osek Monastery fell into decline. By 1580, Pope Gregory XIII dissolved the abbey, and the remaining monks relocated to Sedlec and Zbraslav.

The abbey's property came directly under the Prague Archbishopric, and the monastery was reestablished in 1626 with the support of Archbishop John Lohelius. However, it did not appoint its own abbot until 1650. In the 18th century, the abbey underwent a transformation, being rebuilt in the Baroque style by the architect Octavio Broggio.

=== Contemporary history ===
During World War II, part of the monastery was forcibly requisitioned and sold to the occupying German army. After the war, Abbot Eberhard Harzer and numerous monks faced investigations and false accusations of collaborating with the Nazis. Despite lacking evidence, they were still condemned to hard labor in the coal mines near Osek.

Most Cistercian monks were subsequently expelled to Germany, and Salesians briefly took over the monastery. However, their presence was cut short during the K Action in 1950, a state-led suppression of monasteries and abbeys in Communist Czechoslovakia. The abbey was changed into an internment camp for hundreds of monks and priests. Later, it became home to religious sisters from six different religious orders.

The Cistercians could return to Osek after 1989. In 1991, the newly elected Abbot Bernhard Thebes moved to the monastery with a small community of monks. Bernhard Thebes died in 2010 as the last abbot of Osek and was buried in the crypt of the monastery church. Currently, there is no monastic community living in the monastery.

In 1995, it was designated a national cultural monument of the Czech Republic.

== Architecture ==
The monastery occupies a significant portion of the town's centre, with its most prominent feature being the Church of the Assumption of the Virgin Mary. This three-nave basilica of Romanesque origin has a three-axis façade but lacks a large tower in adherence to Cistercian traditions. Instead, the bell is located in a smaller "sanctus" tower. A notable high-Gothic statue of Virgin Mary is located in a side nave.

The convent, built in the first half of the 13th century, consists of a Gothic cloister and a chapter house with a unique early Gothic stone ambon from around 1240. It was rebuilt between 1705 and 1708 in the Baroque style.

The abbot's residence (prelature), located at the main entrance of the monastery, was constructed between 1719 and 1725. It consists of three wings with an inner court adjacent to the eastern wing of the convent. The clock tower of the prelature houses four bells, each created by a different bellmaker.

A significant portion of the abbey complex consists of auxiliary buildings. Previously used as stables, workshops, and a brewery. Today, only the brewery remains active, supplying local pubs. Adjacent to these structures is the Chapel of St. Catherine, formerly part of the abbey's hospital, and a watermill.

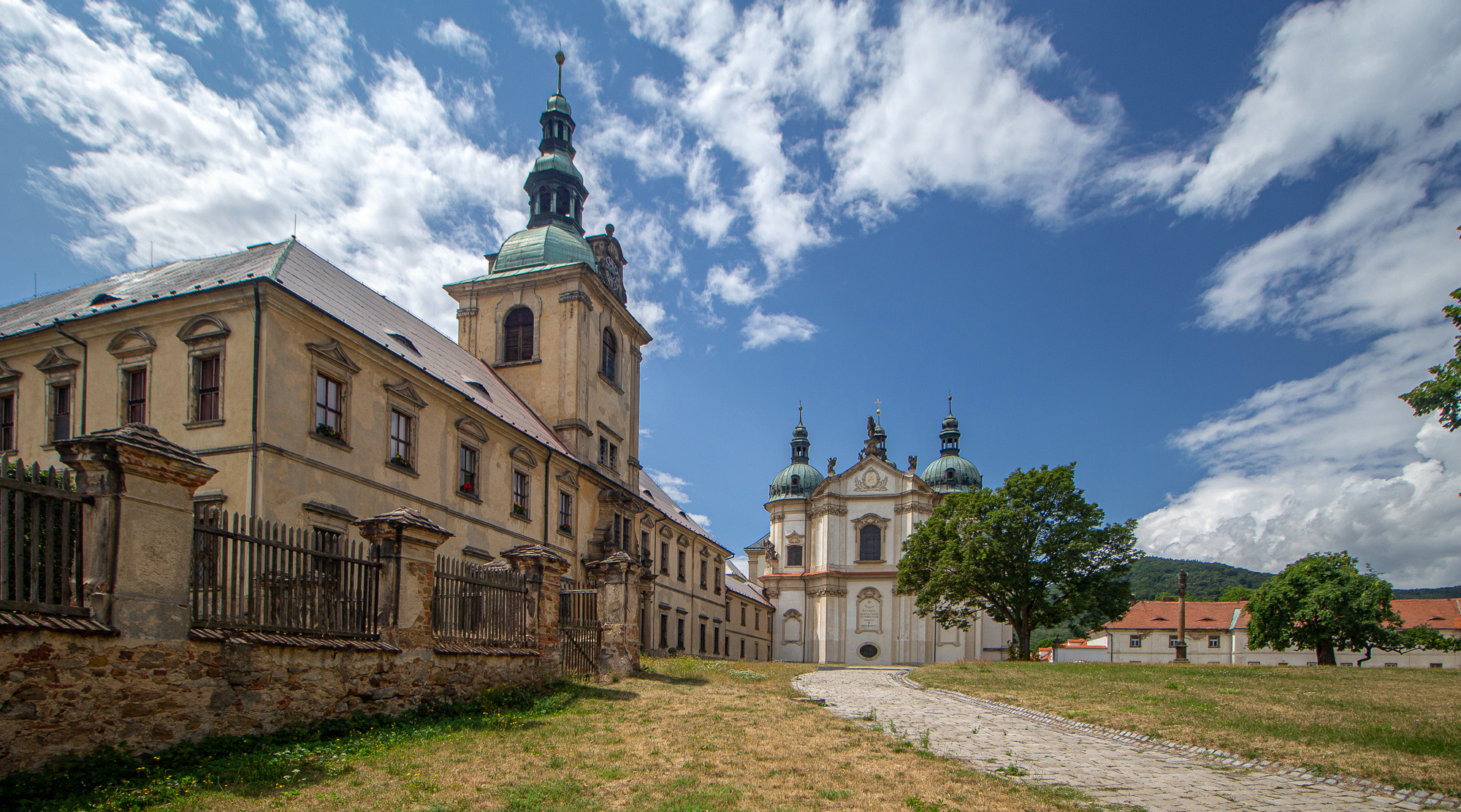
Abbot's residence with a tower and the abbey church in the background

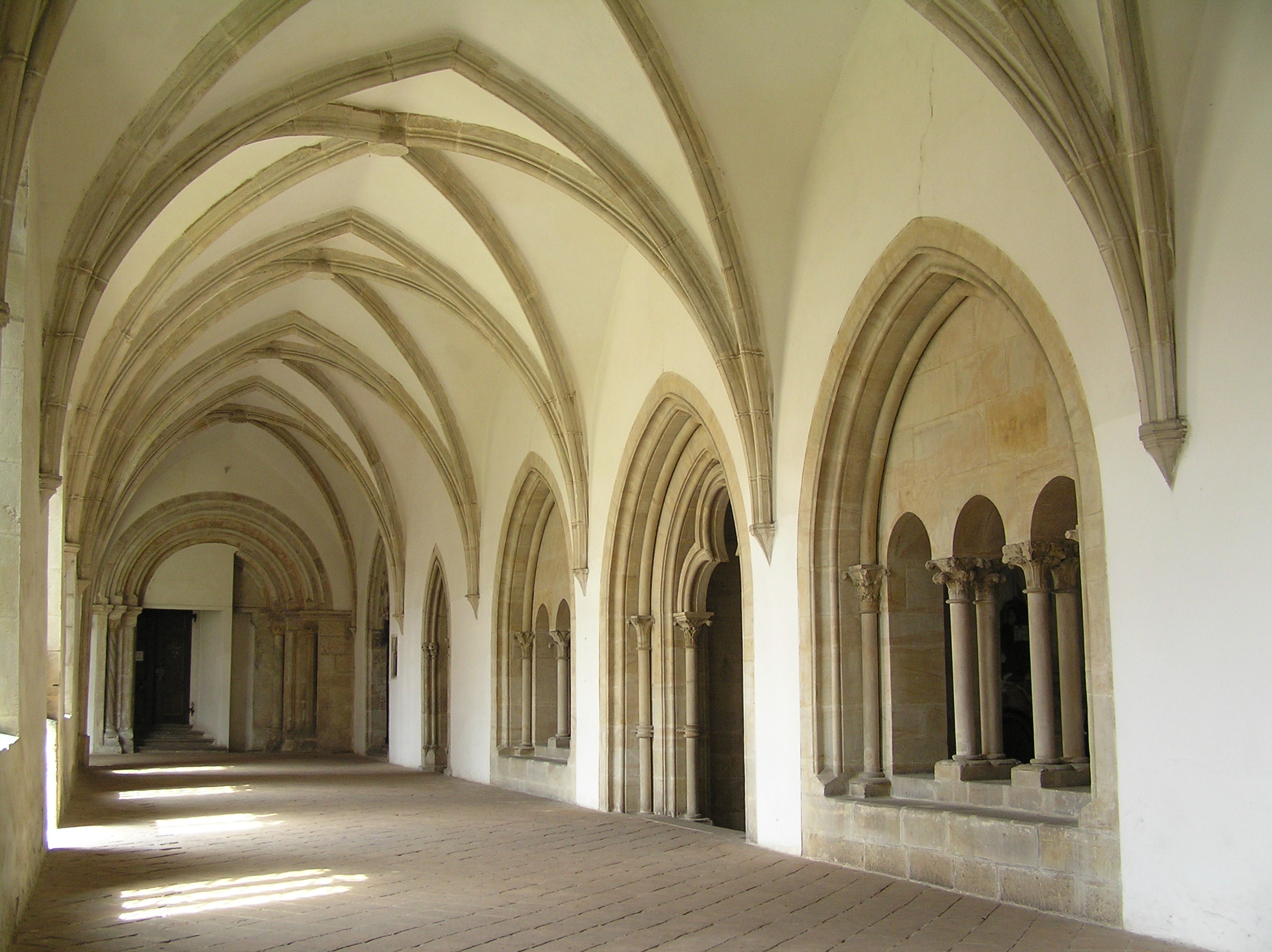
Medieval cloister

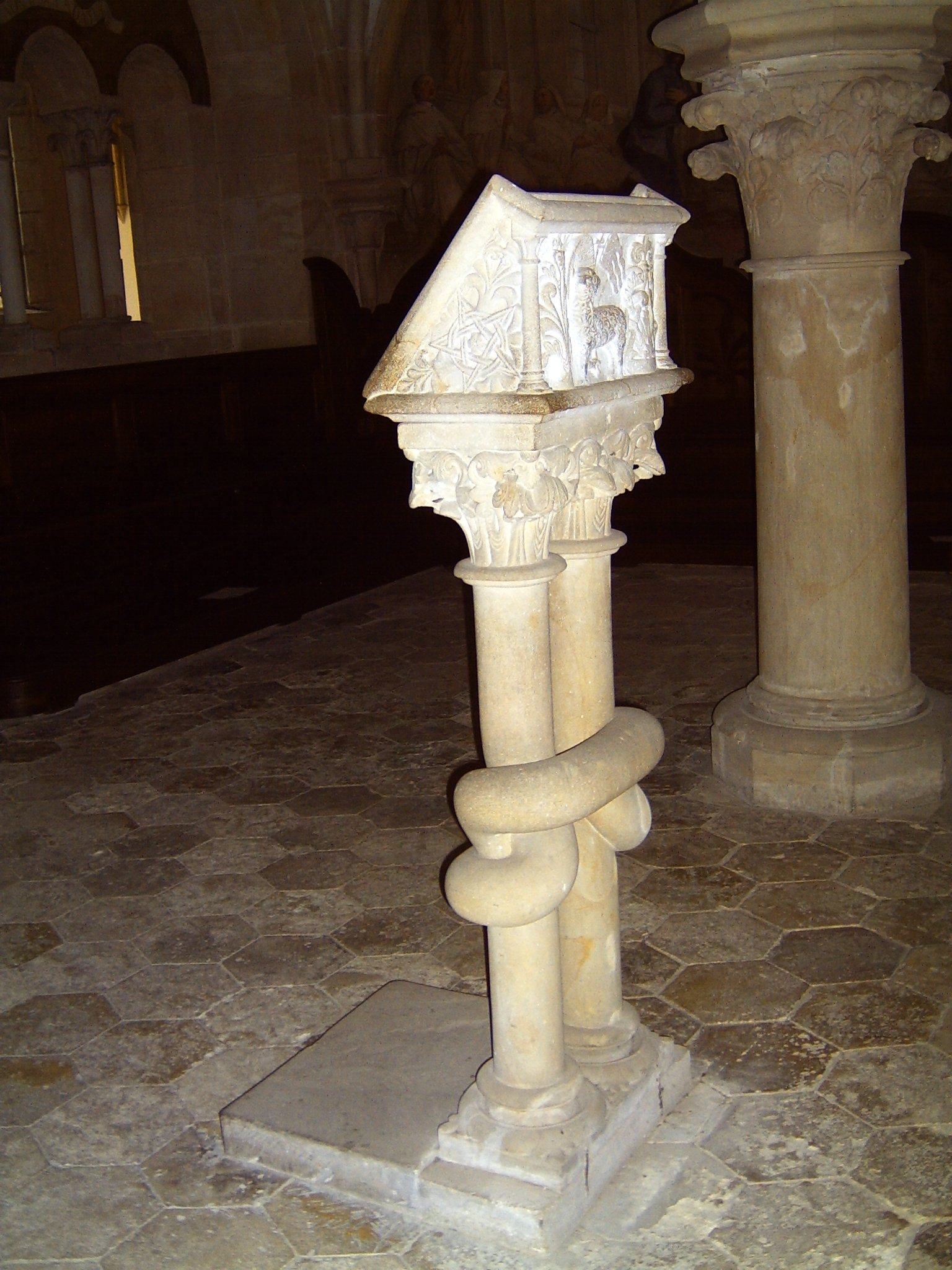
Ambon in the chapter house

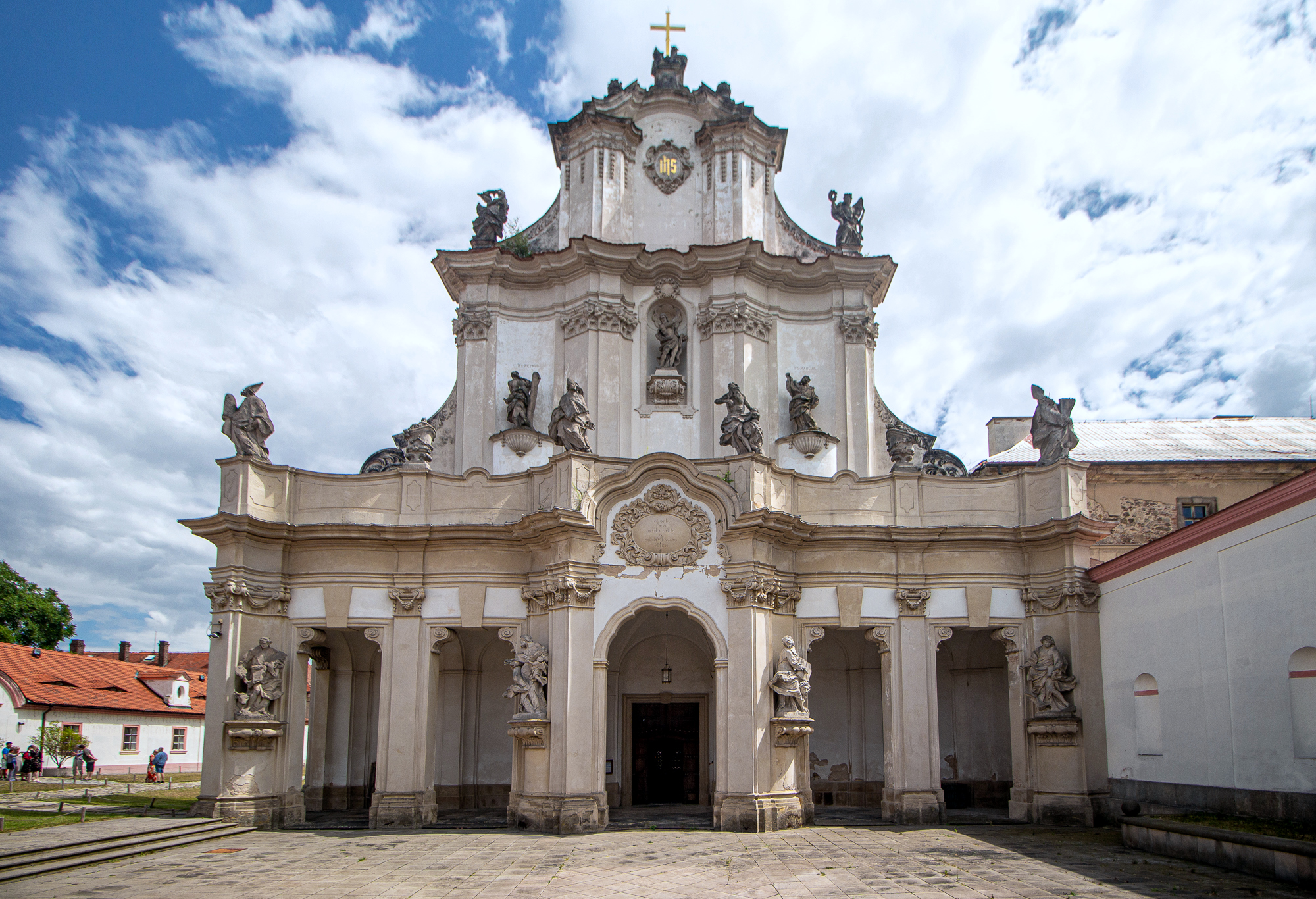
Church of the Assumption of the Virgin Mary

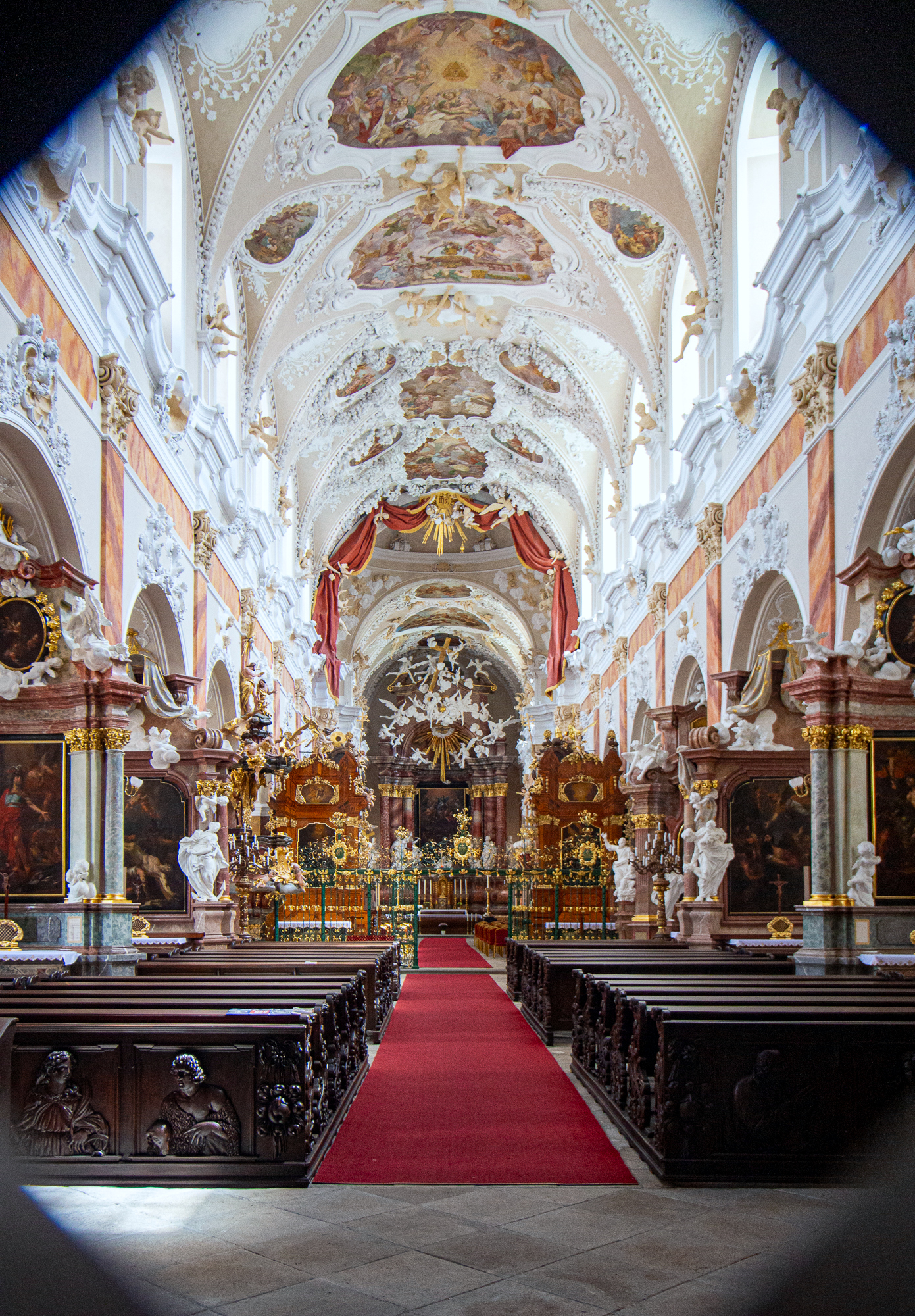
Interior of the church

== Literature ==
- 800 let kláštera Osek: jubilejní sborník = 800 Jahre Kloster Ossegg: Festschrift. Osek: Milan Holenda, 1996. ISBN 80-85204-30-4
- Stehlíková, Dana (ed.): 800 let kláštera v Oseku (1196–1996). Katalog výstavy Opatství cisterciáků v Oseku, 25. května 1996 – 20. října 1996. Unicornis, Prague 1996. (in Czech)
