= Nížkov =

- Municipality
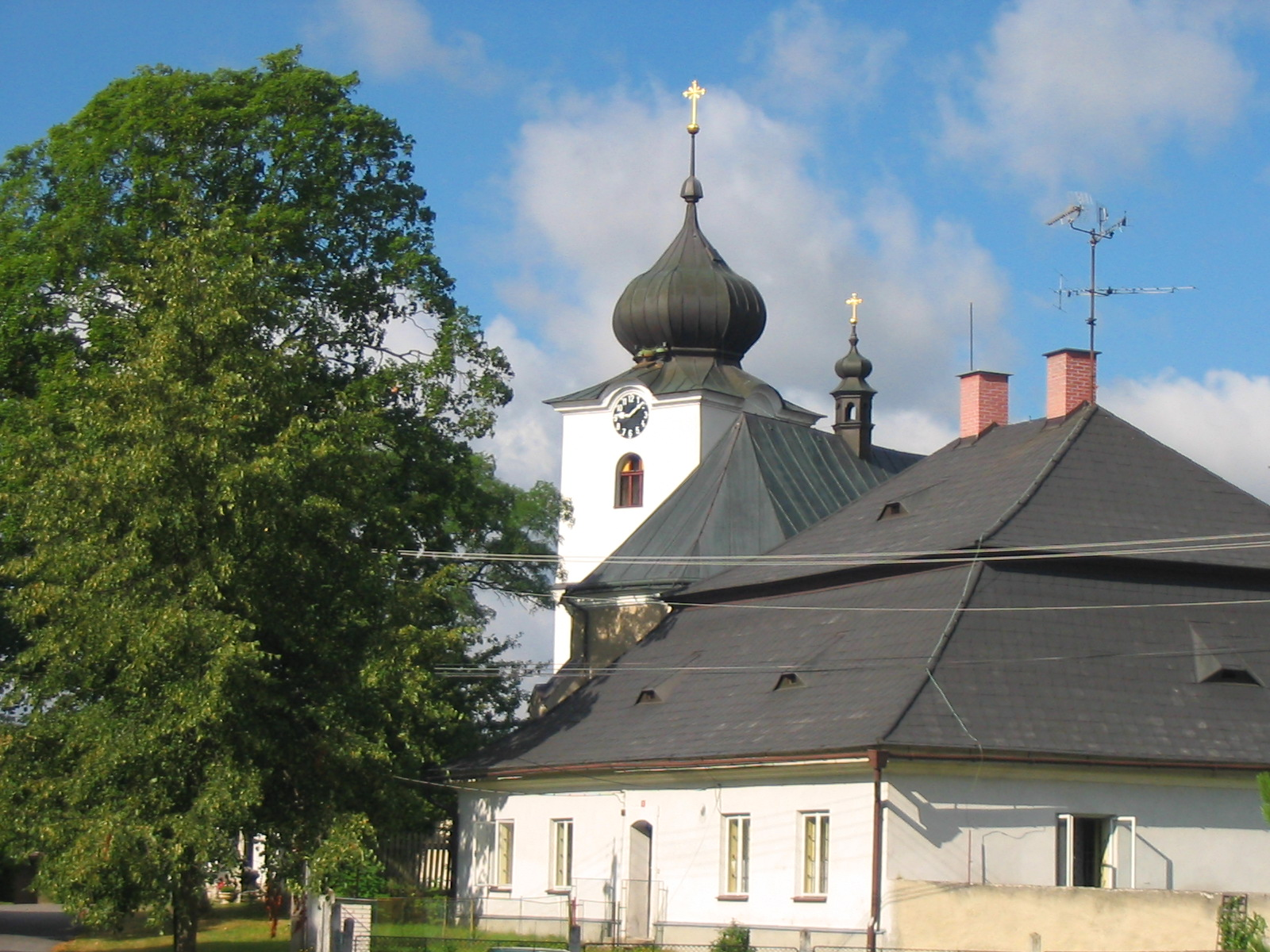
- Church of Saint Nicholas

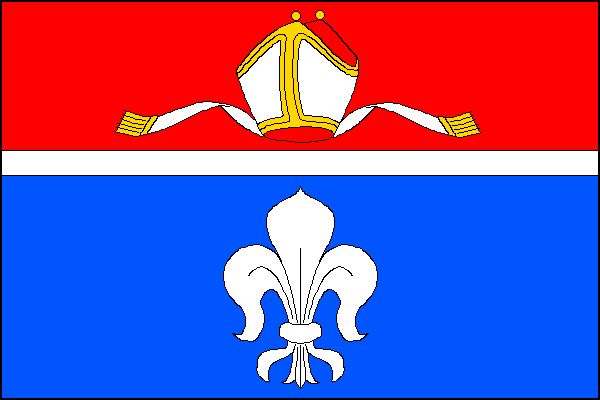
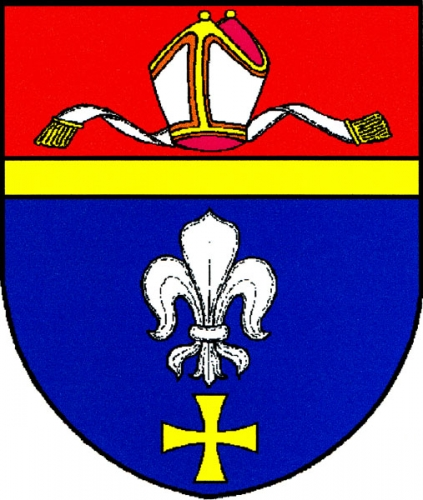
- Flag Coat of arms

- Location in the Czech Republic
- Coordinates: 49°31′57″N 15°48′21″E
- Country: Czech Republic
- Region: Vysočina
- District: Žďár nad Sázavou
- First mentioned: 1234

Area
  - Total: 18.33 km^{2} (7.08 sq mi)
- Elevation: 527 m (1,729 ft)

Population (2026-01-01)
  - Total: 972
  - Density: 53.0/km^{2} (137/sq mi)
- Time zone: UTC+1 (CET)
  - Summer (DST): UTC+2 (CEST)
- Postal code: 592 12
- Website: www.nizkov.cz

Nížkov is a municipality and village in Žďár nad Sázavou District in the Vysočina Region of the Czech Republic. It has about 1,000 inhabitants.

== Administrative division ==
Nížkov consists of three municipal parts (in brackets population according to the 2021 census):

- Nížkov (734)
- Buková (150)
- Špinov (39)

== Etymology ==
The village was originally called Mníškov (from the Czech word mnich, i.e. 'monk'), but due to complicated pronunciation, the name was distorted to Nížkov.

== Geography ==
Nížkov is located about 10 kilometres (6 mi) west of Žďár nad Sázavou and 21 km (13 mi) northeast of Jihlava. It lies mostly in the Upper Sázava Hills. A small part of the municipal territory in the southeast extends into the Křižanov Highlands and includes the highest point of Nížkov at 615 m (2,018 ft) above sea level. The stream Poděšínský potok flows through the municipality.

== History ==
The first written mention of Nížkov is from 1234, when there was founded a monastery with a wooden church by the monks from Osek.

== Demographics ==
Historical population

Year	Pop.	±%
1869	900	—
1880	1,034	+14.9%
1890	939	−9.2%
1900	919	−2.1%
1910	972	+5.8%

Year	Pop.	±%
1921	962	−1.0%
1930	919	−4.5%
1950	753	−18.1%
1961	702	−6.8%
1970	709	+1.0%

Year	Pop.	±%
1980	728	+2.7%
1991	800	+9.9%
2001	864	+8.0%
2011	925	+7.1%
2021	923	−0.2%

Source: Censuses

== Transport ==
Nížkov is located on the railway line Havlíčkův Brod–Žďár nad Sázavou.

== Sights ==
The main landmark of Nížkov is the Church of Saint Nicholas. It is an early Gothic church from the second half of the 13th century. In 1753, the Baroque nave was added and the tower was raised. The ossuary from 1709 stands in front of the west façade of the church.
