= Lubiąż =

- Village
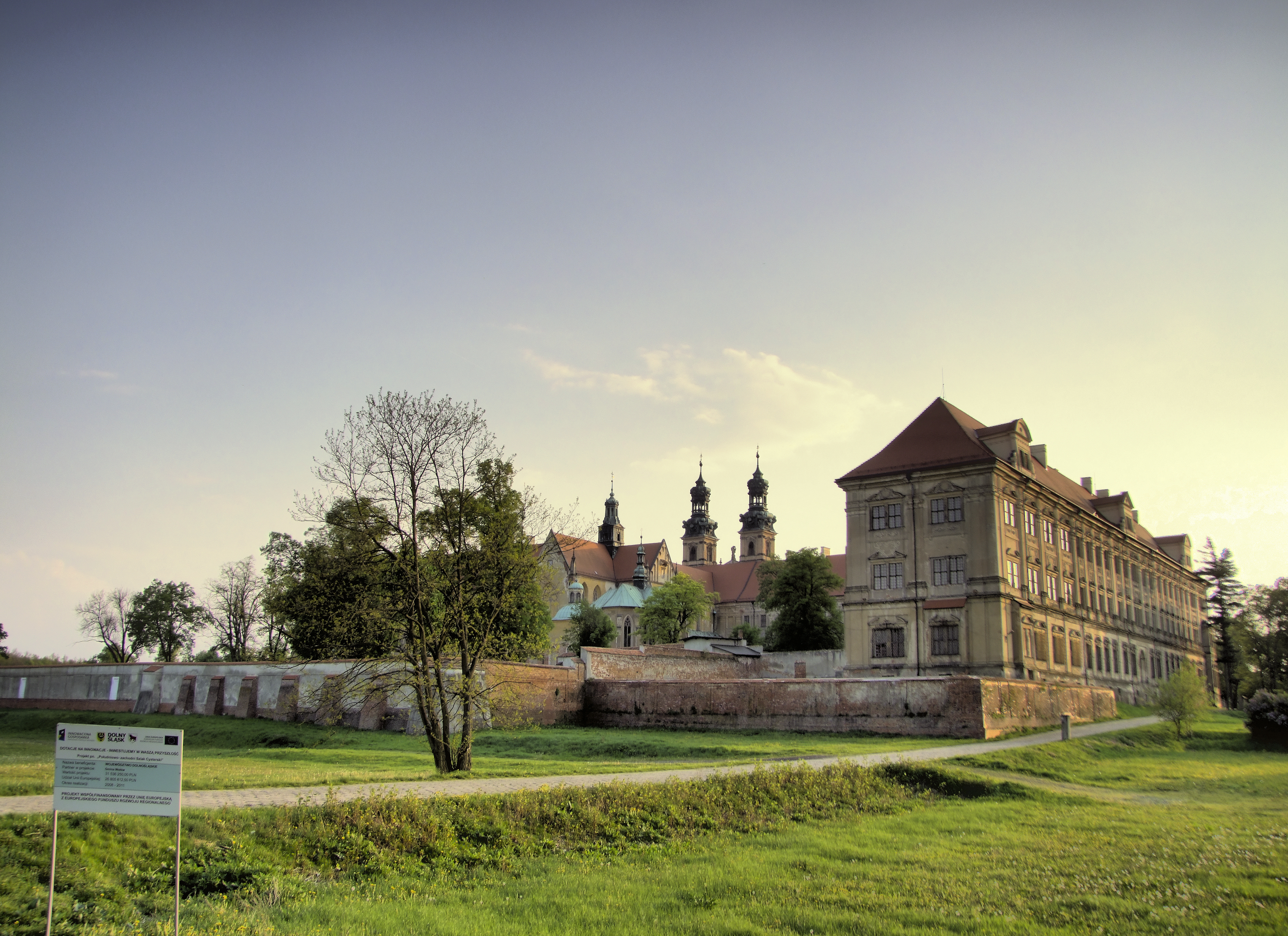
- Cistercian Abbey in Lubiąż

- Coat of arms

- Location within Poland
- Coordinates: 51°16′N 16°29′E
- Country: Poland
- Voivodeship: Lower Silesian
- County: Wołów
- Gmina: Wołów
- Population (2006): 2,300
- Time zone: UTC+1 (CET)
  - Summer (DST): UTC+2 (CEST)
- Postal code: 56-110
- Area code: +48 71
- Car Plates: DWL

Lubiąż ([ˈlubjɔ̃ʂ], German: Leubus) is a village (former town) on the east bank of the Odra (Oder) River, in the administrative district of Gmina Wołów, within Wołów County, Lower Silesian Voivodeship, in south-western Poland.

The village is mainly known for its large abbey. The Abbey was built by the Benedictines in 1150, and occupied by Cistercians in 1163 until 1810. Built over centuries, the abbey – the largest Cistercian abbey in the world – is rated in the highest class ("0") of landmarks of world's cultural heritage. Lubiąż is also known in Poland for its regional psychiatric hospital.

== History ==
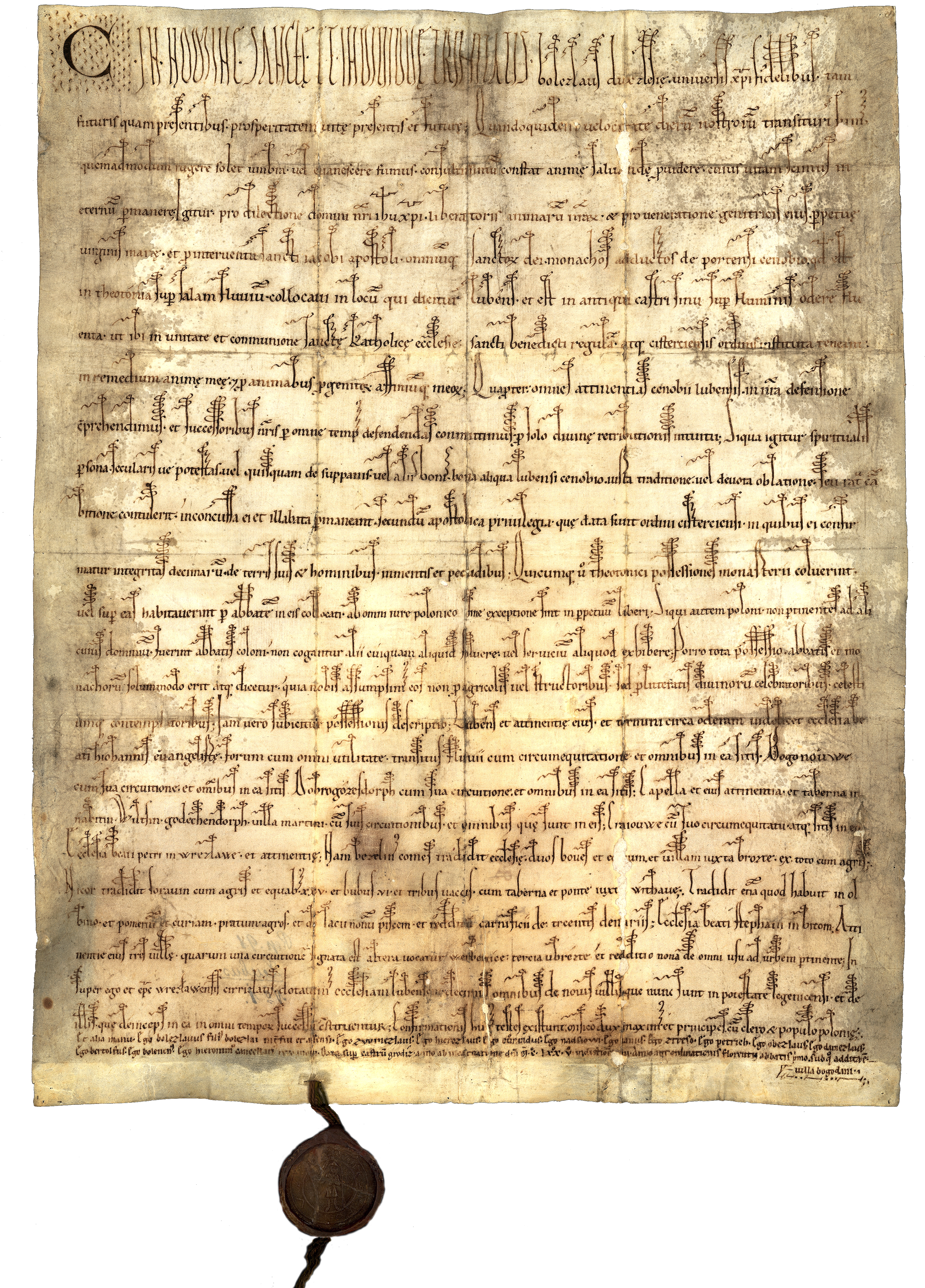
Document of Duke Bolesław I the Tall from 1175, founding the Cistercian monastery

The village is located on one of the oldest river crossings in Silesia. This crossing was protected by a castle, which was probably destroyed in 1108, and populated by Poles, who lived in a market named Lubies, which was documented in 1175. According to legend, the settlement was founded in 1053 by Polish monarch Casimir I the Restorer. Since its establishment, the settlement along with the region, was part of Piast-ruled Poland, and following Poland's fragmentation it belonged to various Silesian duchies of Poland, ruled by dukes of the Silesian branch of the Piast dynasty. The name of the settlement is of Polish origin, although there are different interpretations of its exact meaning.

In the middle of the 12th century an abbey was founded on the place of the former castle. Sources disagree on the exact date and nature of the foundation. While some sources claim the monastery was founded around 1150 by Benedictines and soon after passed to the Cistercians, other sources argue the monastery was founded by Cistercians around 1163. The deed of foundation was ratified in 1175 by Bolesław I the Tall, who chose the abbey as the burial place for him and his dynasty. The monastery was settled with Cistercian monks from Pforta in the Margraviate of Meissen, Bolesław refuge during his stay in Germany. In the same document the duke allowed the monastery to settle their territory with Germans and to exclude them from Polish law, making it the first place of the Ostsiedlung in Silesia. The small town Leubus was founded on the place of the former Polish market, the place Germanized, and received Środa town rights (town rights modeled on the town of Środa Śląska) in 1249 from Duke Bolesław II the Horned.

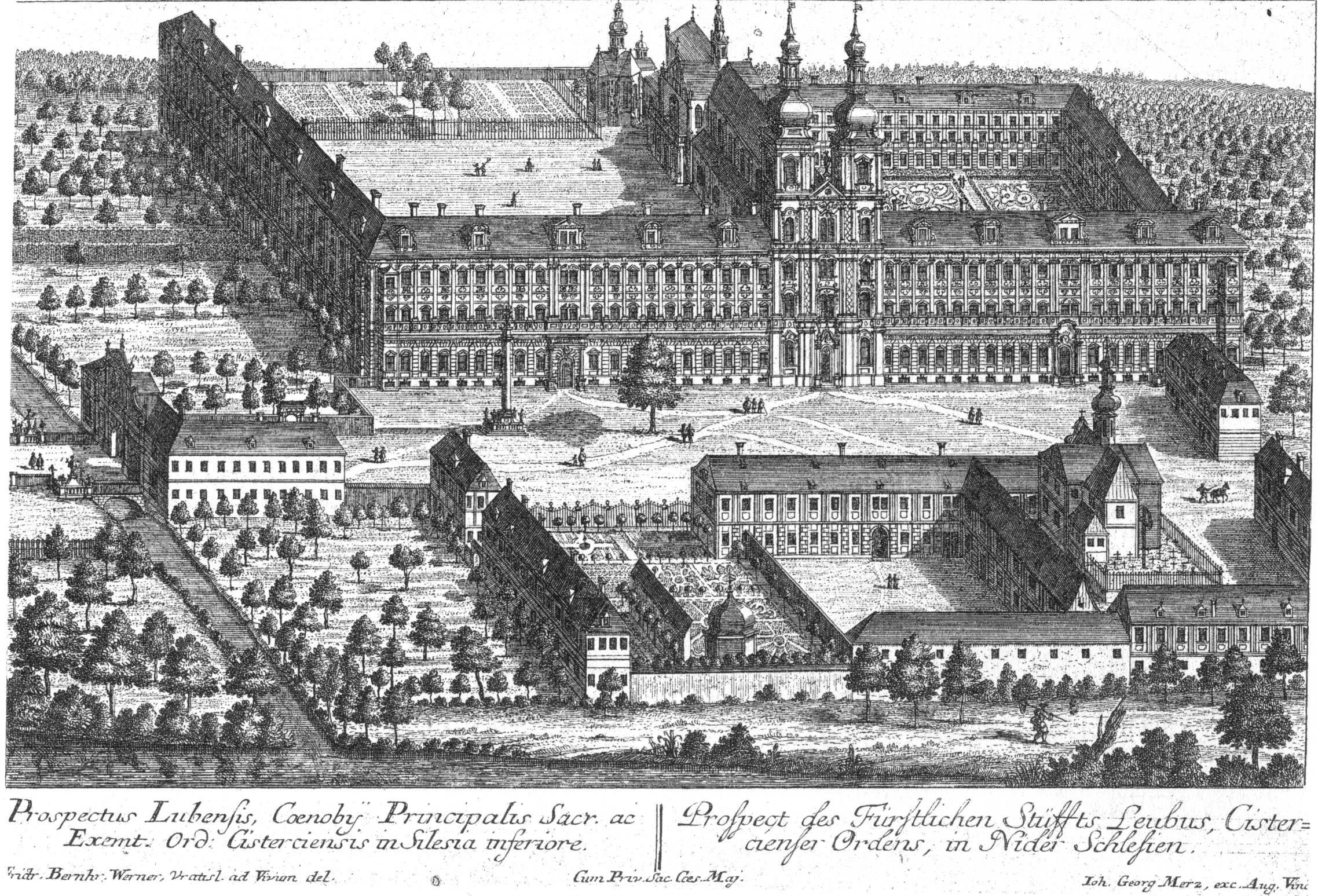
Old view of the abbey

In 1317, the town passed from the Duchy of Głogów to the Duchy of Legnica, and remained ruled by the Piast dynasty until 1675, although since 1329 under the suzerainty of the Crown of Bohemia (Czechia), which was part of the Holy Roman Empire. On 30 June 1432 the Hussites invaded the town, devastating and burning the monastery. The area was heavily affected by the Thirty Years' War. In 1632 it was plundered by the Saxons, and in 1639 was occupied by Swedish forces. Following the extinction of the Piast dynasty and the dissolution of the Duchy of Legnica in 1675, the town was incorporated into the Bohemian Crown, then ruled by the House of Habsburg. In the second half of the 17th century the painter Michael Willmann resided in the local abbey.

In 1740 Silesia (and so Leubus) was taken from Austria by the Kingdom of Prussia. Municipal law was lost in 1740, and irrevocably in 1844. In 1810, the abbey was secularized and closed down by the Prussian administration, and in 1830 a psychiatric hospital was placed there. From 1871 until 1945 Leubus belonged to the German Empire, Weimar Republic and finally Nazi Germany. During World War II, it was the location of a forced labour subcamp of the Nazi prison for youth in Wołów, and in 1942–1943, also a forced labour camp for hundreds of Luxembourgers deported from German-occupied Luxembourg. The Luxembourgish prisoners were then either sent to other concentration camps or murdered by the Germans in the village. In January 1945, the settlement was seized by the Red Army without resistance. Afterwards, it passed again to Poland, although with a Soviet-installed communist regime, which remained in power until the Fall of Communism in the 1980s. Soviet troops occupied parts of the village until 1948, and the remaining German inhabitants who were not evacuated, were expelled in accordance with the Potsdam Agreement. The first enterprise launched after the war was the distillery, launched in May 1945 with the help of former Polish forced labourers who still remained in the settlement. In 1945–1947, the settlement was repopulated by Poles displaced from Żydaczów and Poznanka in former eastern Poland annexed by the Soviet Union and Polish repatriates from France.

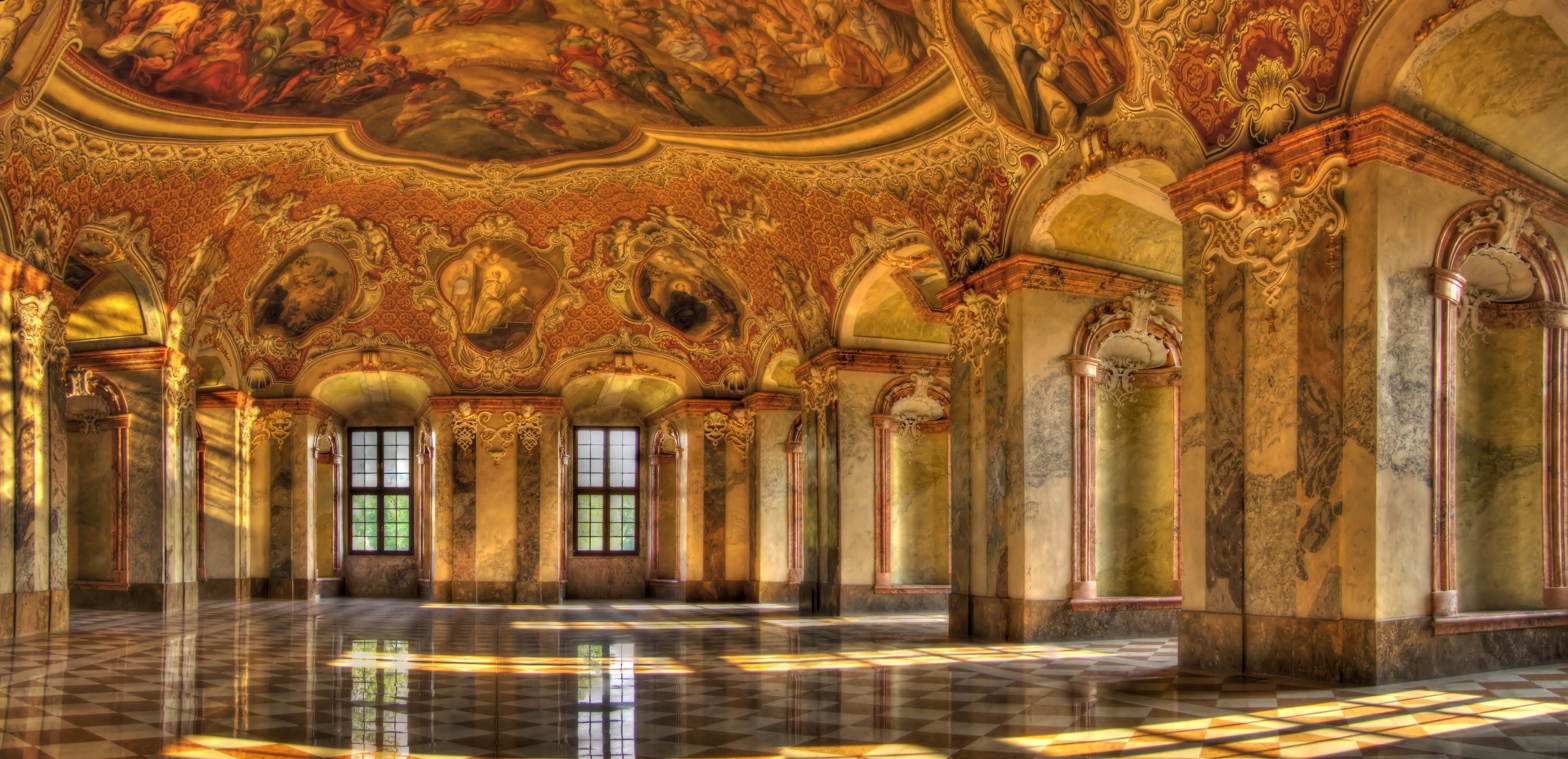
Main refectory of the abbey

In 2016, Lubiąż was visited by Guillaume, Hereditary Grand Duke of Luxembourg and his wife Stéphanie.

== Sports ==
The local football team is Odra Lubiąż. It competes in the lower leagues.
