= Michael Willmann =

German painter

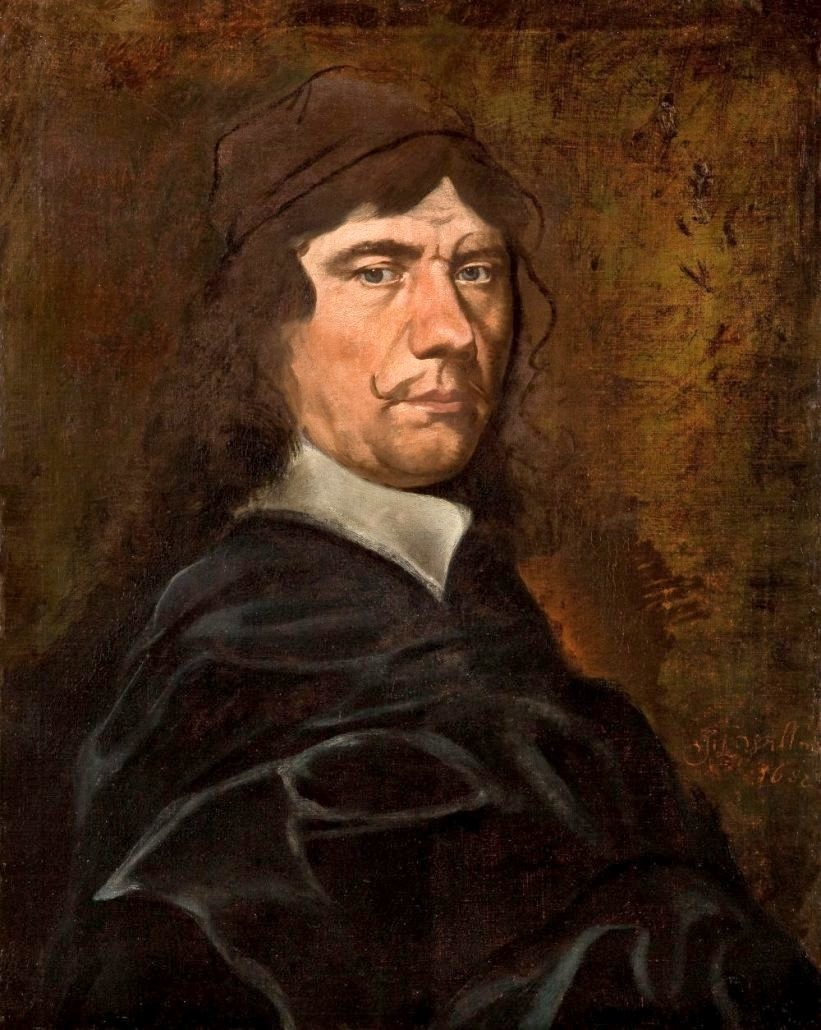
- Self portrait, 1682
- Born: Michael Willmann; 27 September 1630; Königsberg, Duchy of Prussia
- Died: 26 August 1706 (aged 75); Leubus, Holy Roman Empire
- Education: Jacob Adriaensz Backer
- Known for: Painting
- Notable work: The Martyrdom of the Apostles cycle
- Movement: Baroque

Michael Leopold Lukas Willmann (27 September 1630 – 26 August 1706) was a German painter. The Baroque artist became known as the "Silesian Rembrandt", "Silesian Apelles" or "Silesian Raphael" and has been called the greatest Silesian painter of the baroque period.

== Life ==
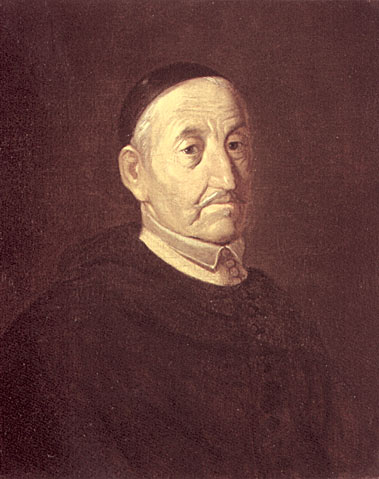
Portrait of Arnold Freiberger, Abbot of Leubus

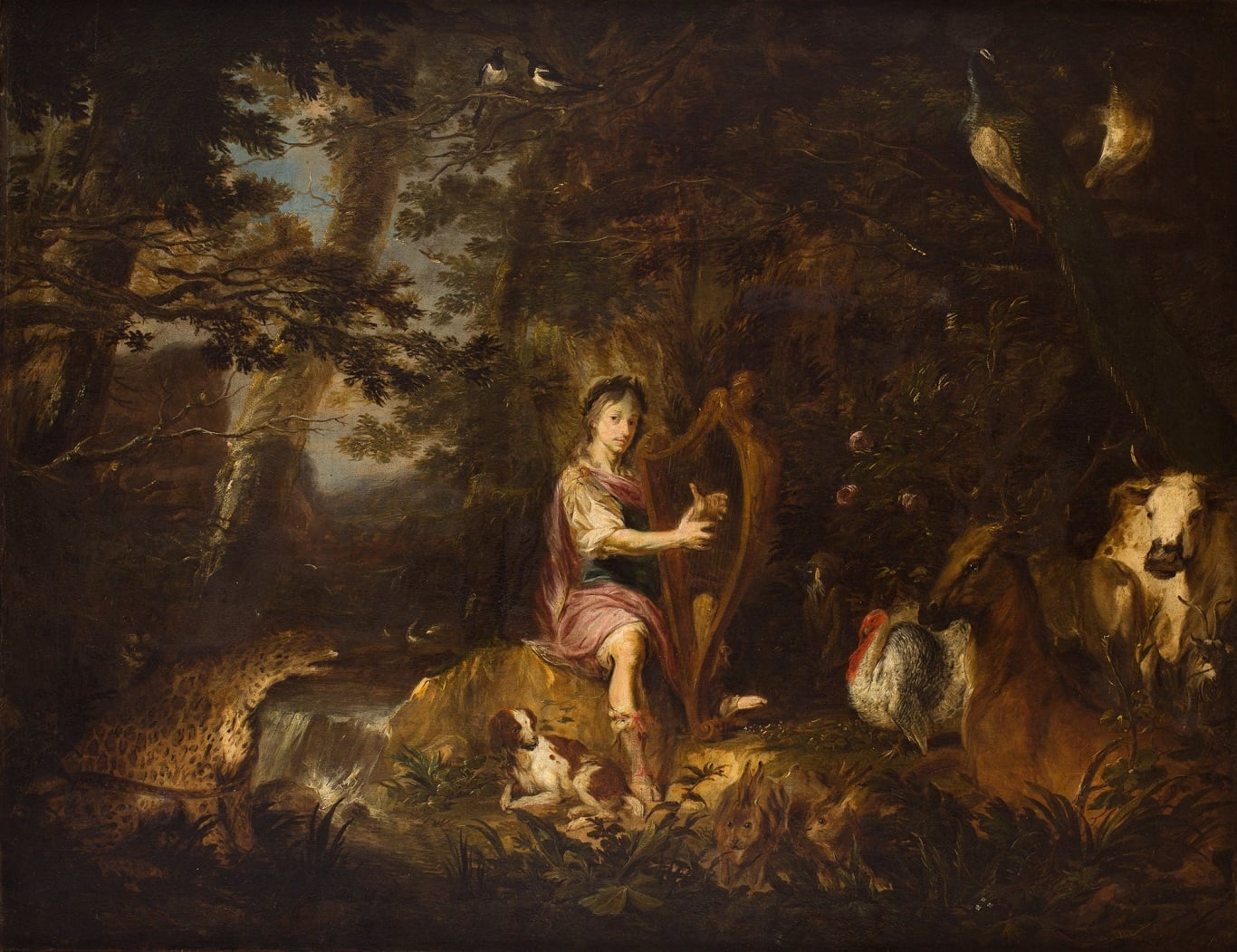
Orpheus playing a harp

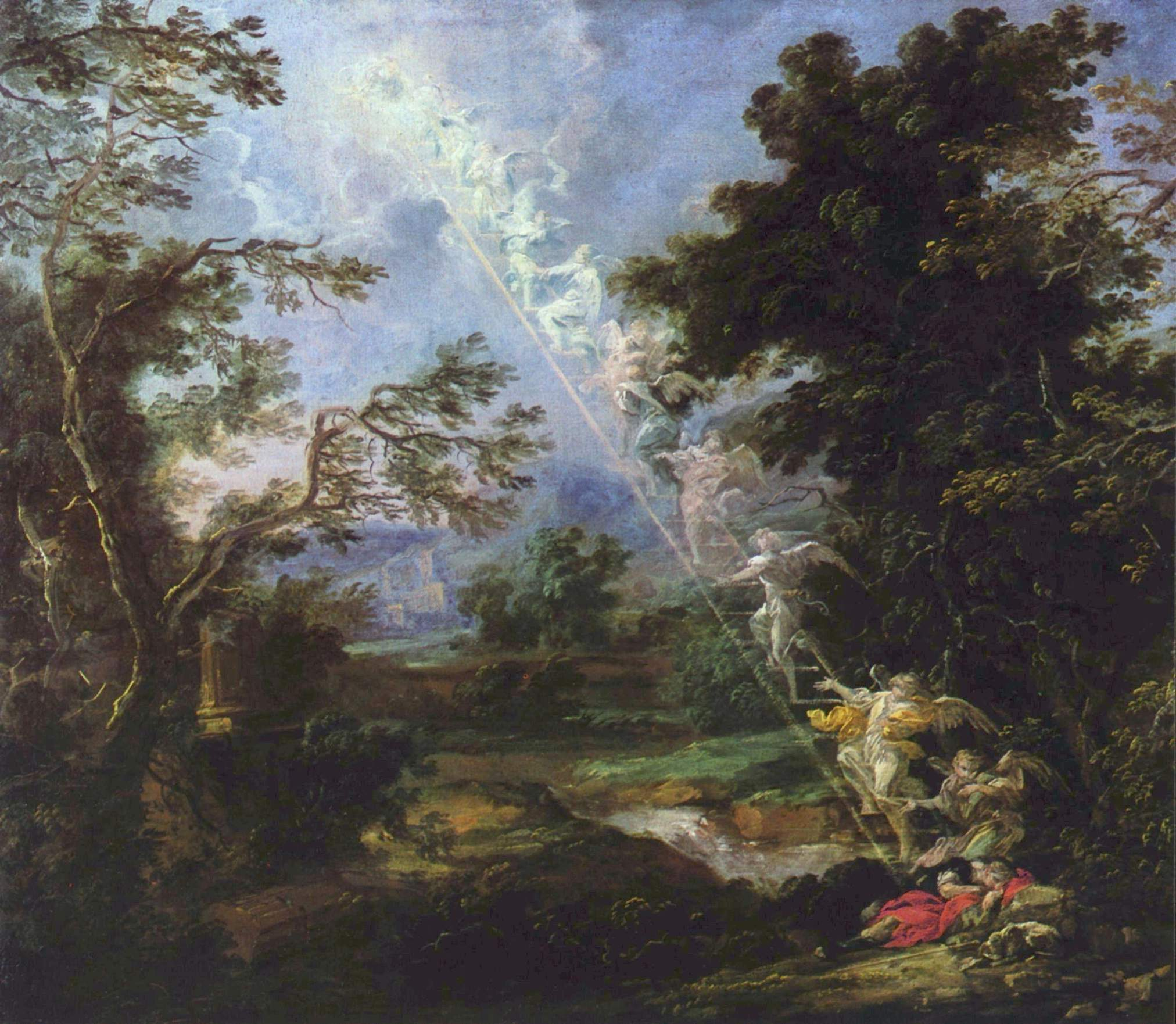
Jacob's ladder

Willmann was born in Königsberg (Królewiec; today Kaliningrad), Duchy of Prussia a fief of Kingdom of Poland. He was educated by his father, the painter, Christian Peter Willmann. His family was impoverished Calvinist nobility. Michael went to the Dutch Republic in 1650 to learn from the masters, and he was inspired by the works of Rembrandt, Peter Paul Rubens, and Anthony van Dyck. For financial reasons he was unable to afford studying at the studio of a well-known painter. He therefore studied on his own, often copying works of the artists he was inspired on. His early style was particularly influenced by the style of Rembrandt. While he is often described as self-thought, he studied for a time under Jacob Adriaensz Backer.

After two years in the Netherlands, mostly spent in Amsterdam, in 1653 Willmann returned to Königsberg, passed his master's examination, and began to travel. After visiting Danzig (Gdańsk), Willmann went to Prague, where he stayed from 1653–55. He then spent about a year in Breslau (Wrocław). Willmann's first known painting, Landscape with John the Baptist, commissioned by Abbot Arnold Freiberger of the Abbatia Lubensis abbey in Leubus (Lubiąż), Lower Silesia, dates from 1656. Leubus, a village in the Silesian part of the Holy Roman Empire, would become the setting of much of Willmann's creativity.

From 1657–58 Willmann was in Berlin as the court painter of Frederick William, Elector of Brandenburg. He painted mythological scenes for the elector, presumably for his residence at Königsberg Castle. In 1660 Willmann returned to Leubus, which allowed him a large workshop.

Willmann's workshop, modeled after those of the Dutch painters, quickly spread his fame. The extensive family studio included his son Michael Leopold Willmann the Younger, his daughter Anna Elisabeth, and Anna Elisabeth's husband Christian Neuenhertz and son Georg Wilhelm Neunhertz. Willmann's studio also counted Johann Kretschmer from Glogau (Głogów), Johann Jacob Eybelwieser from Breslau, the Cistercian Jacob Arlet from Grüssau, and Willmann's stepson Jan Kryštof Liška.

Willmann became the leading painter of Silesia through his expressiveness, technical dexterity, and speed. Willmann worked on orders from the patriciate of Breslau, as well as churches and monasteries throughout Silesia, Bohemia and Moravia. He received contracts for the Cistercian monasteries in Grüssau, Heinrichau, Kamenz, Rauden, and Himmelwitz. With the assistance of his students and assistants, Willmann produced 500 paintings and frescos during his life; about 300 or so have survived till modern day. Most of his frescos were created after the 1680s.

On 26 November 1662 Willmann married Helena Regina Lischka (Liška) from Prague. In May 1663 he converted from Calvinism to Roman Catholicism and took the baptismal names Leopold (after the emperor) and Lukas (after the patron saint of painters). Willmann's prosperity allowed him in 1687 to acquire a manor near Leubus and sponsor the educations of his son and stepson in Italy. Willmann was detailed in Academia, the 1683 Latin edition of Joachim von Sandrart's Teutsche Academie der edlen Bau-, Bild und Malereikünste.

Willmann died in Leubus in 1706, and was buried in the abbey's crypt alongside the abbots. Because his son died shortly before his father, the studio passed to Willmann's stepson J. K. Liška until 1712, and to Willmann's grandson Georg Wilhelm Neunhertz until 1724, after which it closed. Willmann's house was destroyed in a fire in 1849.

== Post death ==
Willmann coffin was opened in 1738 and his remains were found to be well preserved. His mummy was first photographed in 1901 or 1902. The cyrpt Willmann was in was subject to looting in 1945 and his mummy was damaged between then and 1989.

== Works ==
Willman's style was inspired by artists such as Rembrant, Rubens, van Dyck and Pietro da Cortona. His distinctive style comes from background sketching technique and the adjustment of details. This style was continued by his students.

Painters influenced by Willmann include Wenzel Lorenz Reiner, Petr Brandl, Johann Michael Rottmayr, and Franz Anton Maulbertsch.

Perhaps his most famous work is the series of paintings from The Martyrdom of the Apostles cycle.

== Gallery ==
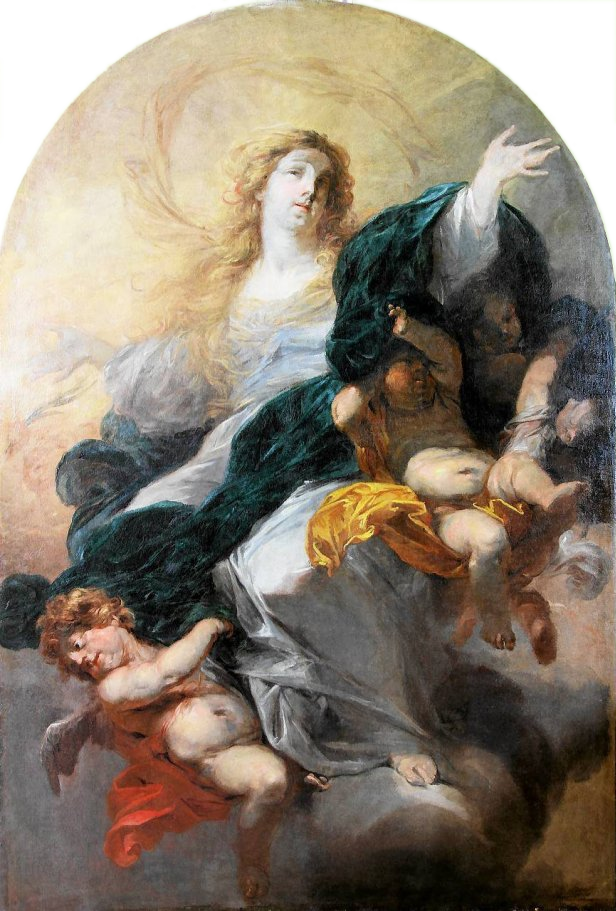
The Assumption of Mary

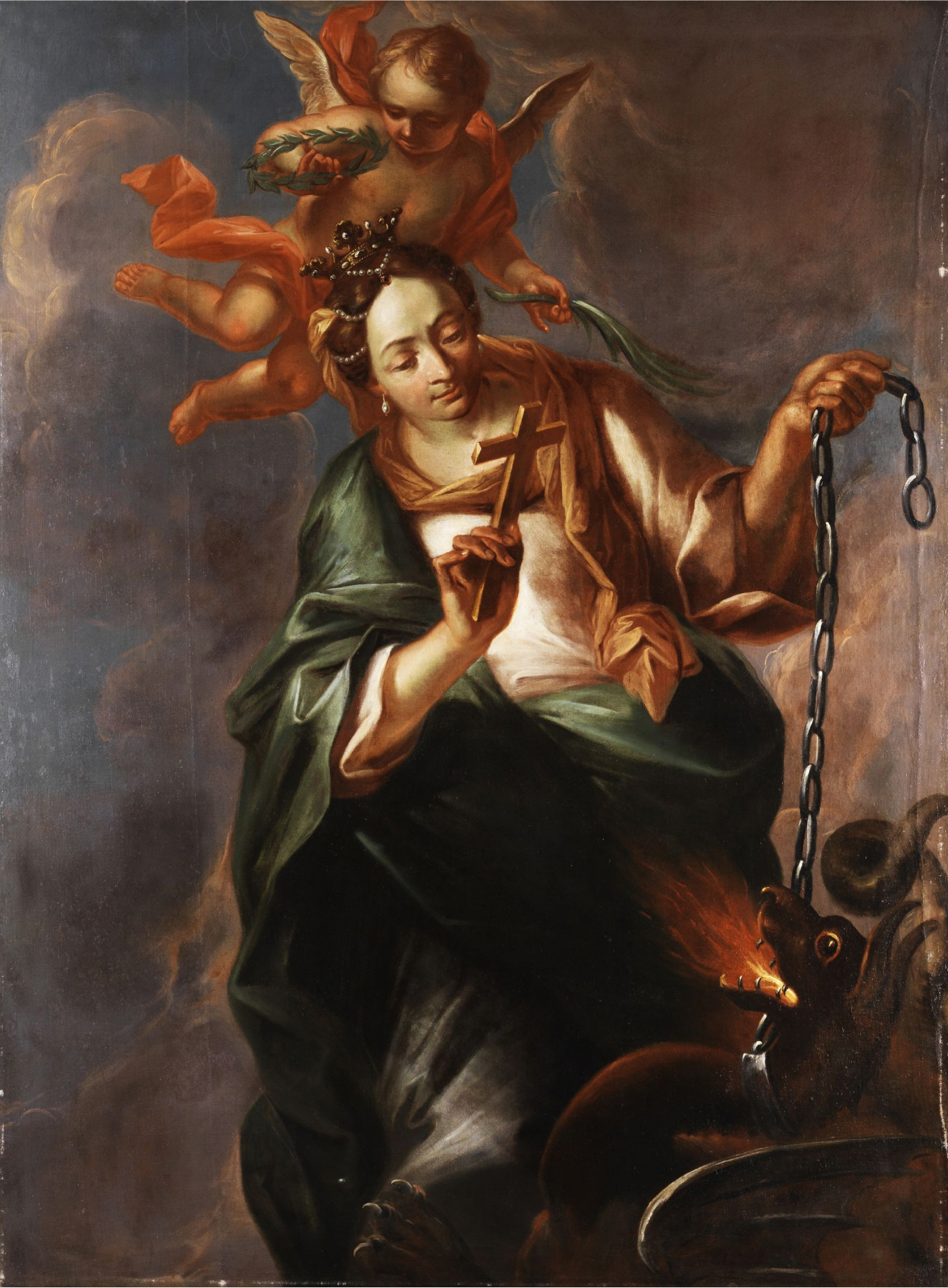
Apotheosis of Saint Margaret

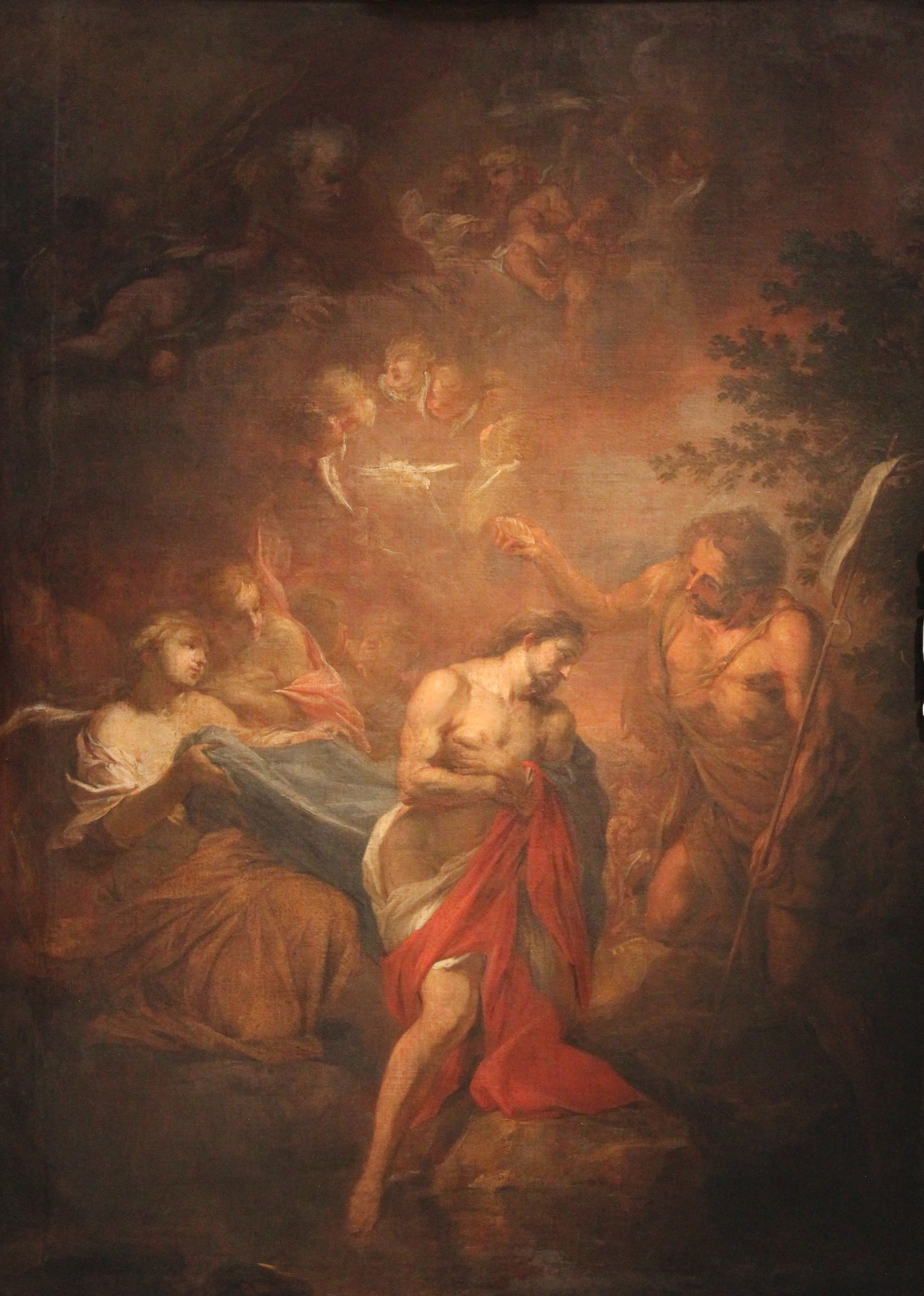
The Baptism of Christ

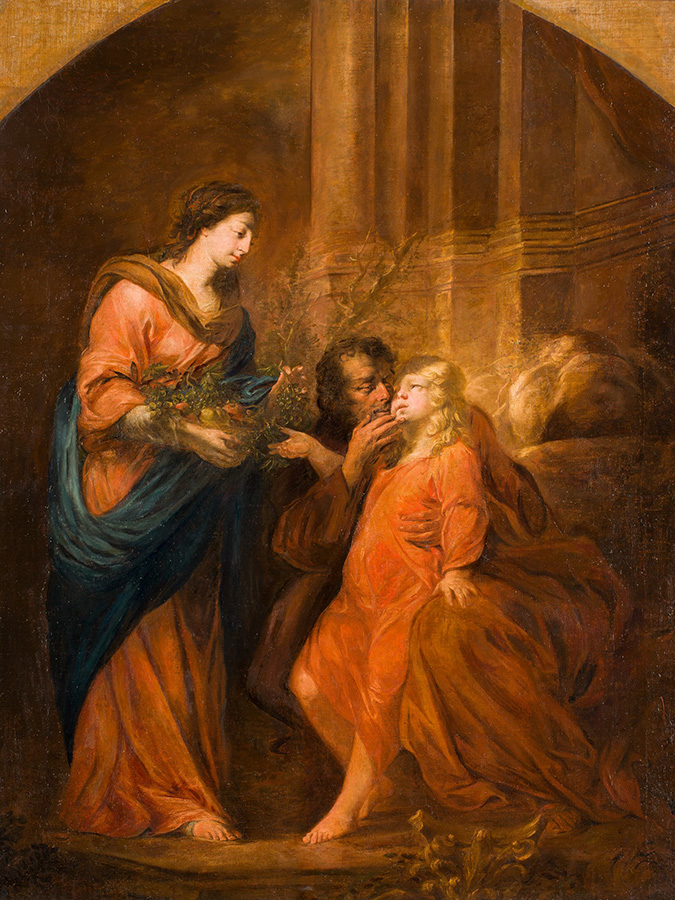
Saint Joseph's Kiss

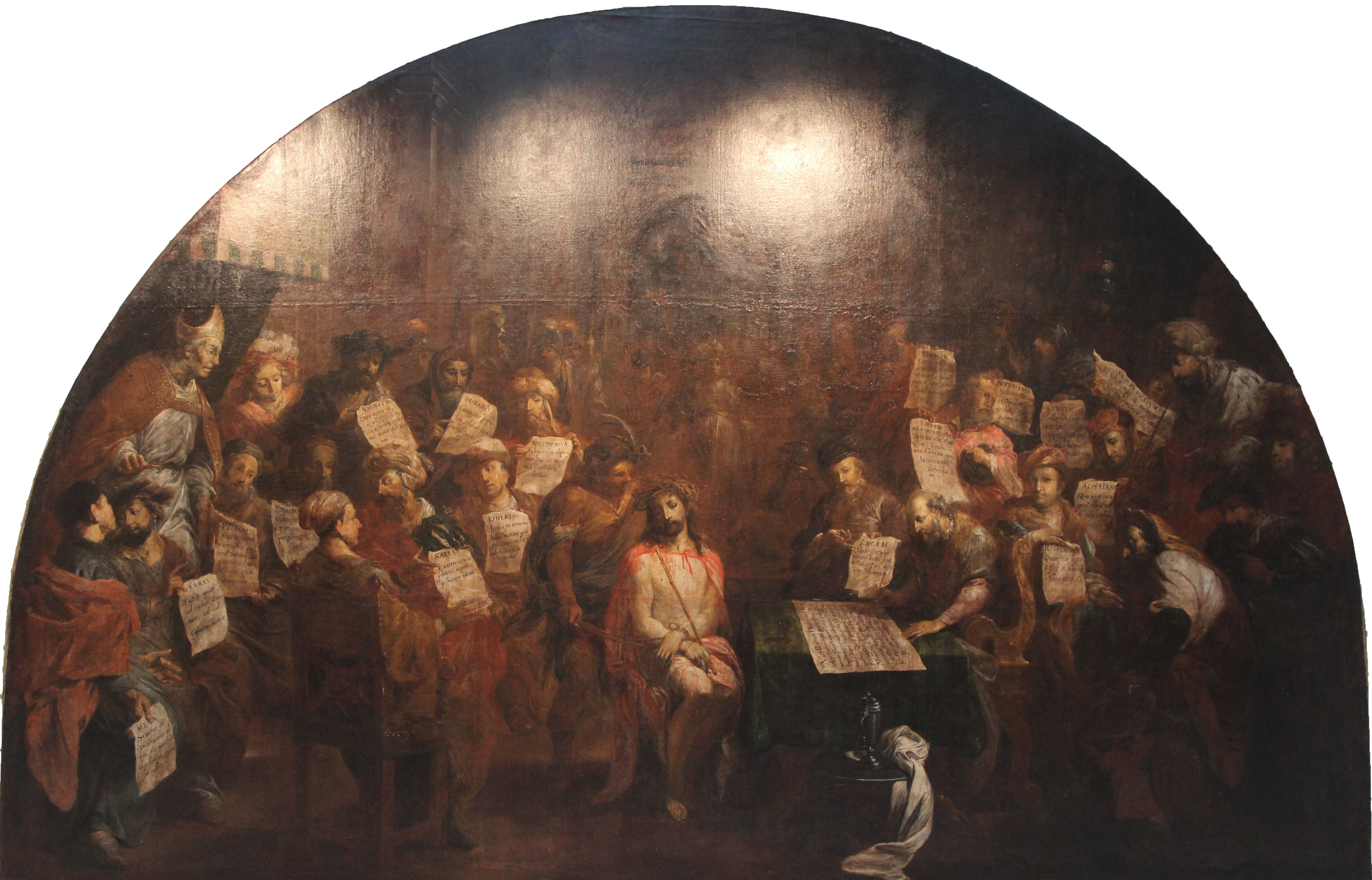
The Trial of Christ

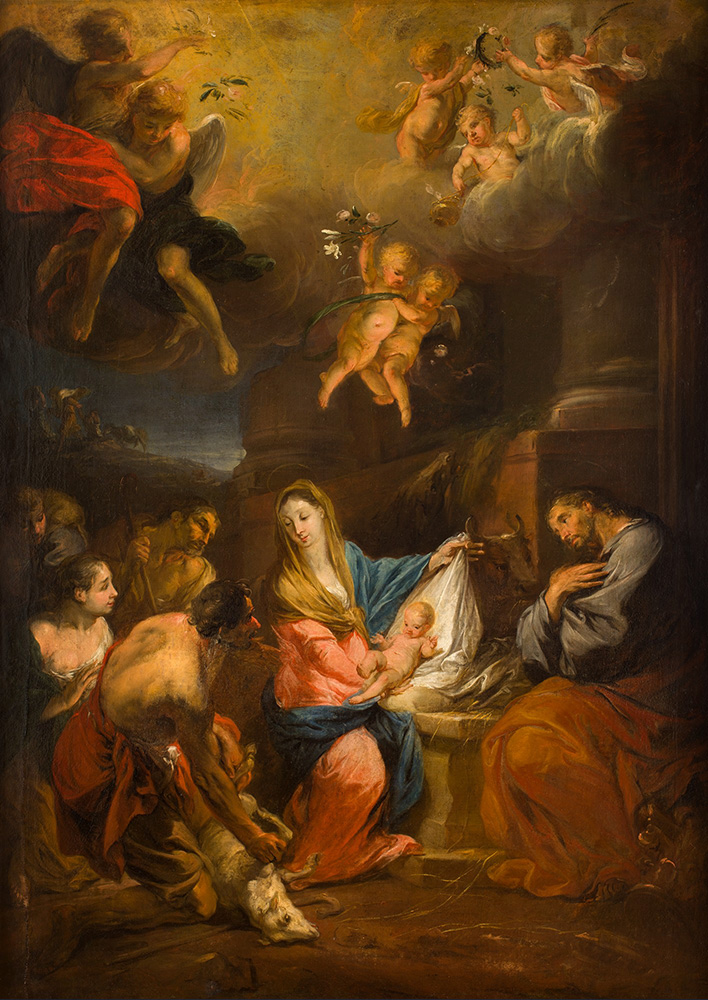
The Adoration of the Shepherds

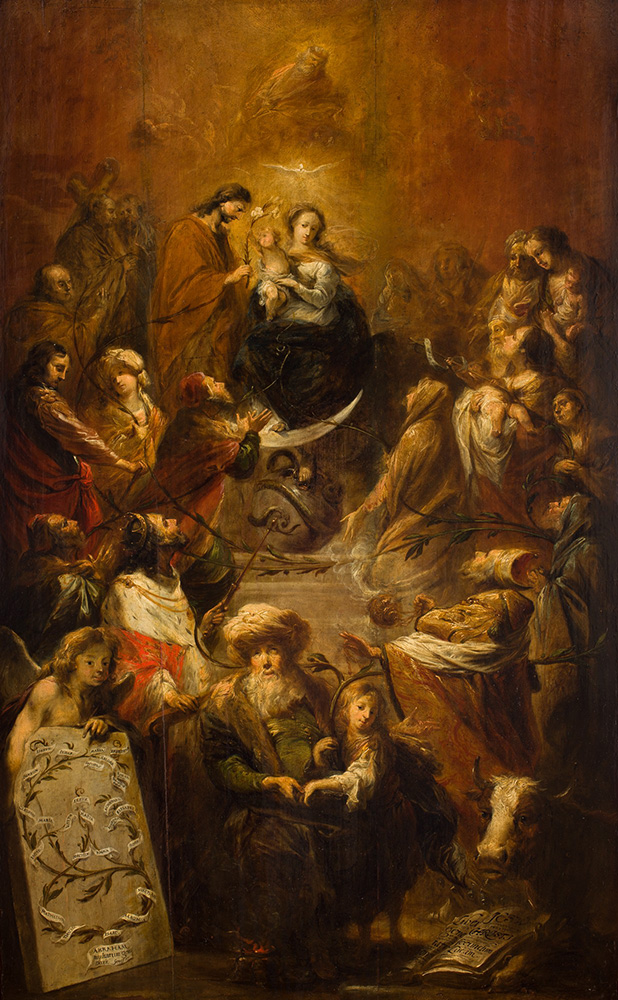
The Tree of Jesse

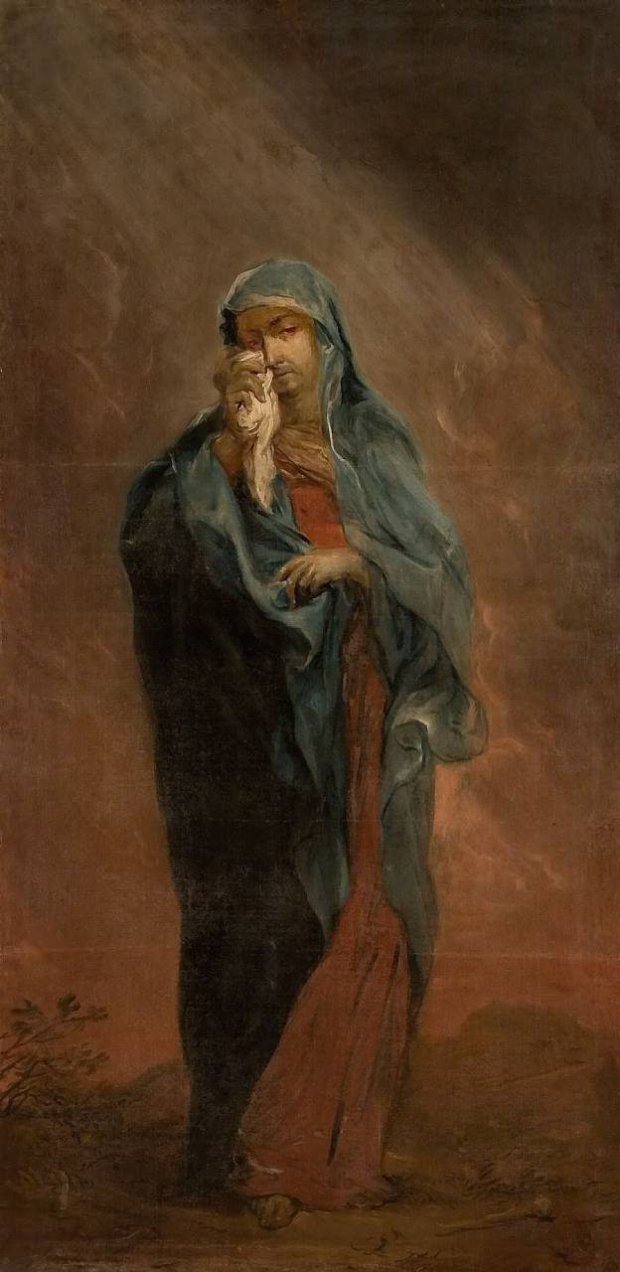
The Sorrowful Madonna

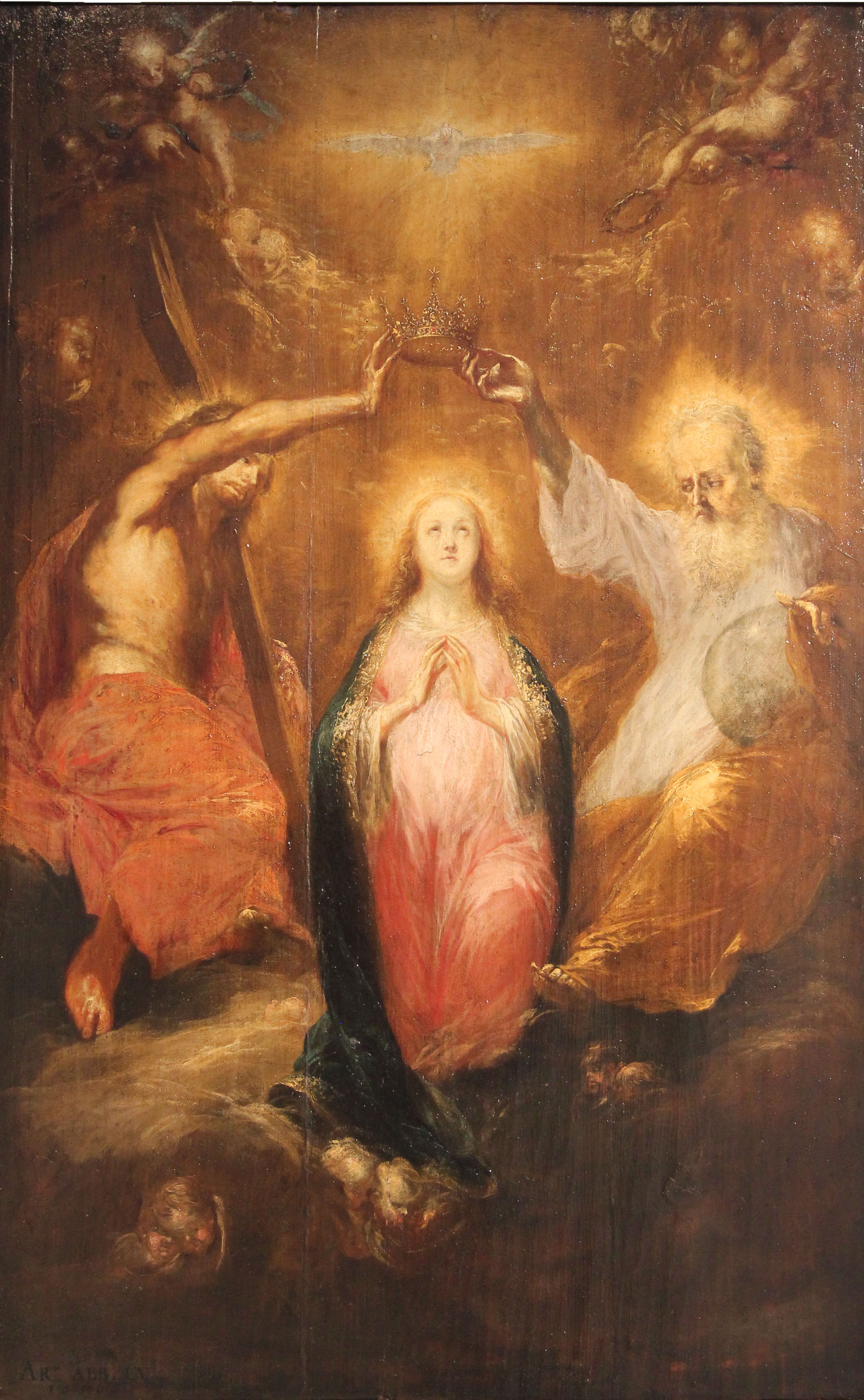
Coronation of the Virgin Mary
