= Mašťov =

- Town
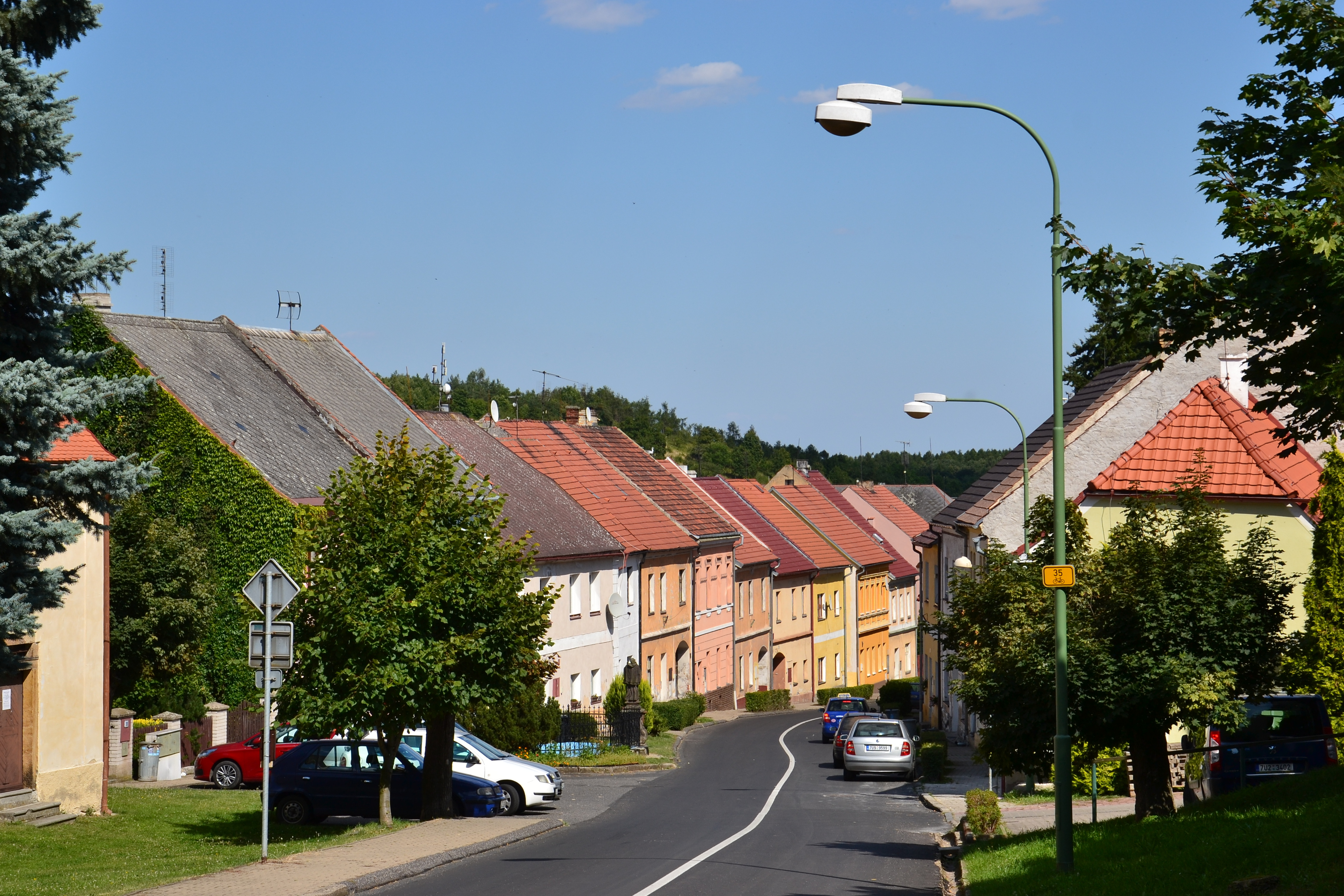
- Kostelní street

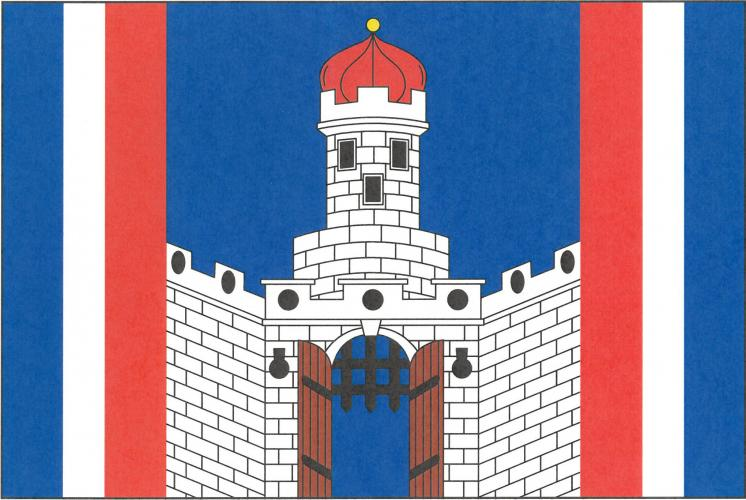
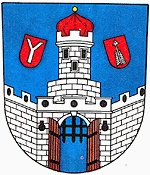
- Flag Coat of arms

- Location in the Czech Republic
- Coordinates: 50°15′42″N 13°16′50″E
- Country: Czech Republic
- Region: Ústí nad Labem
- District: Chomutov
- First mentioned: 1150

Area
  - Total: 23.05 km^{2} (8.90 sq mi)
- Elevation: 375 m (1,230 ft)

Population (2026-01-01)
  - Total: 565
  - Density: 24.5/km^{2} (63.5/sq mi)
- Time zone: UTC+1 (CET)
  - Summer (DST): UTC+2 (CEST)
- Postal codes: 431 55, 431 56
- Website: www.mastov.cz

Mašťov (Czech pronunciation: [ˈmaʃcof]; German: Maschau) is a town in Chomutov District in the Ústí nad Labem of the Czech Republic. It has about 600 inhabitants. The historic town centre is well preserved and is protected as an urban monument zone.

== Administrative division ==
Mašťov consists of three municipal parts (in brackets population according to the 2021 census):

- Mašťov (589)
- Dobřenec (11)
- Konice (0)

== Etymology ==
The initial name of the settlement was Maščov. The name was derived from the personal name Mašč (an abbreviated form of Mašek), meaning "Mašč's (court)".

== Geography ==
Mašťov is located about 23 kilometres (14 mi) southwest of Chomutov and 28 km (17 mi) east of Karlovy Vary. It lies in the Doupov Mountains. The highest point is at 556 m (1,824 ft) above sea level. The fishpond Sedlec is located in the northwestern part of the municipal territory and together with its surroundings, it is protected as a nature reserve. There are also several other small fishponds.

== History ==
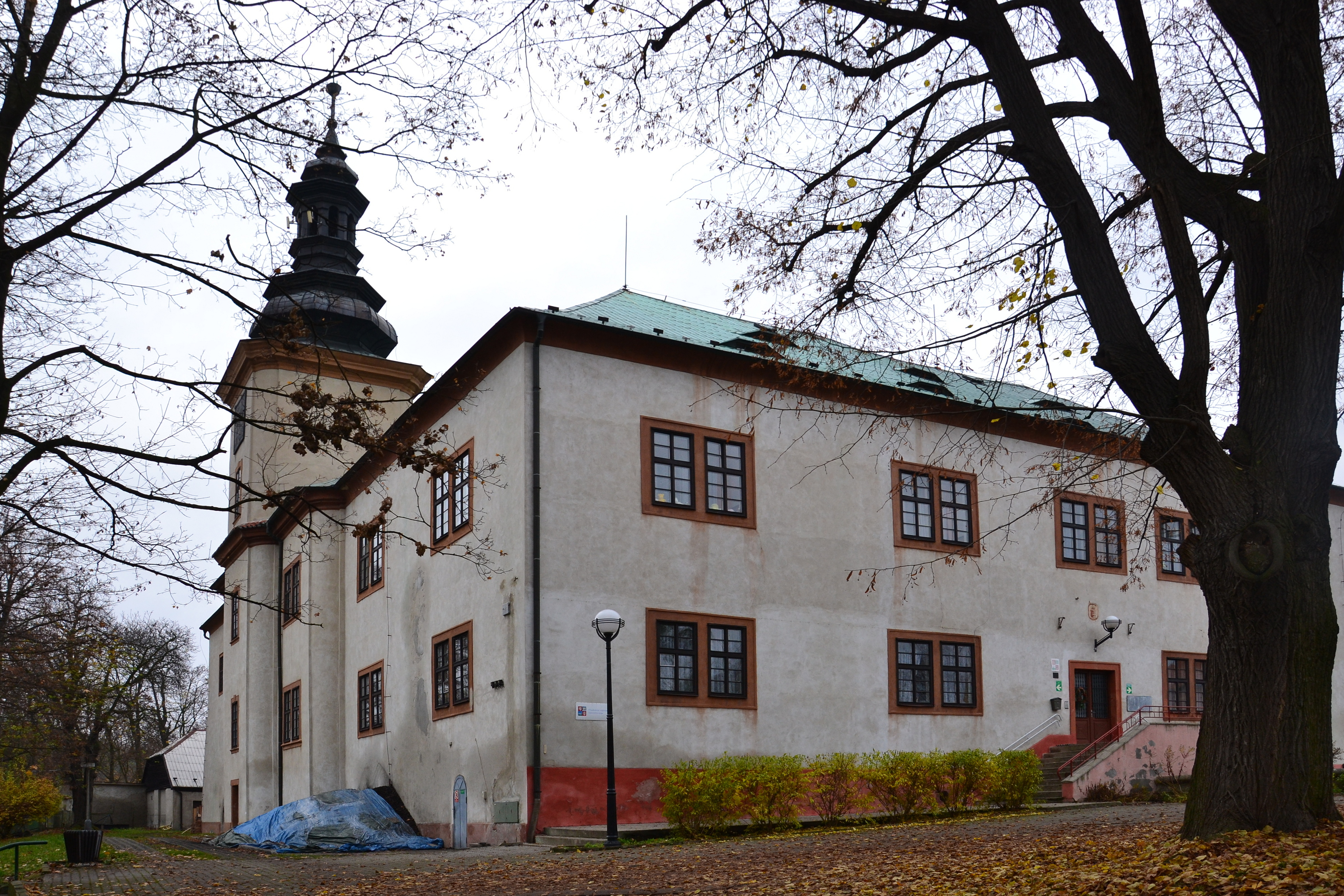
Mašťov Castle

The first written mention of Mašťov is from the first half of the 12th century, when it was awarded to the local aristocrat Milhost by Duke Soběslav I.

Throughout seven centuries the town changed hands multiple times due to political instability, economic hardship, and several wars that also subjected the town to plunder, disease, fire, and famine. In 1918, when the independent country of Czechoslovakia was formed with Mašťov located in the northwestern part of the country, the town was still dealing with the after effects of World War I, such as homelessness and unemployment. Gradually the town recovered, but the booming economy was affected by the worldwide depression of the 1930s.

During World War II, Mašťov was annexed to Nazi Germany through the Munich Agreement and administered as part of the Reichsgau Sudetenland, with all Czech residents forced to leave their homes and move to the central part of Bohemia. After the war, the town slowly recovered but never fully developed into the business and industrial town it had been before.

== Demographics ==
Historical population

Year	Pop.	±%
1869	1,775	—
1880	1,867	+5.2%
1890	1,744	−6.6%
1900	1,484	−14.9%
1910	1,419	−4.4%

Year	Pop.	±%
1921	1,428	+0.6%
1930	1,405	−1.6%
1950	563	−59.9%
1961	531	−5.7%
1970	621	+16.9%

Year	Pop.	±%
1980	594	−4.3%
1991	689	+16.0%
2001	688	−0.1%
2011	601	−12.6%
2021	600	−0.2%

Source: Censuses

== Transport ==
There are no railways or major roads passing through the municipal territory.

== Sights ==
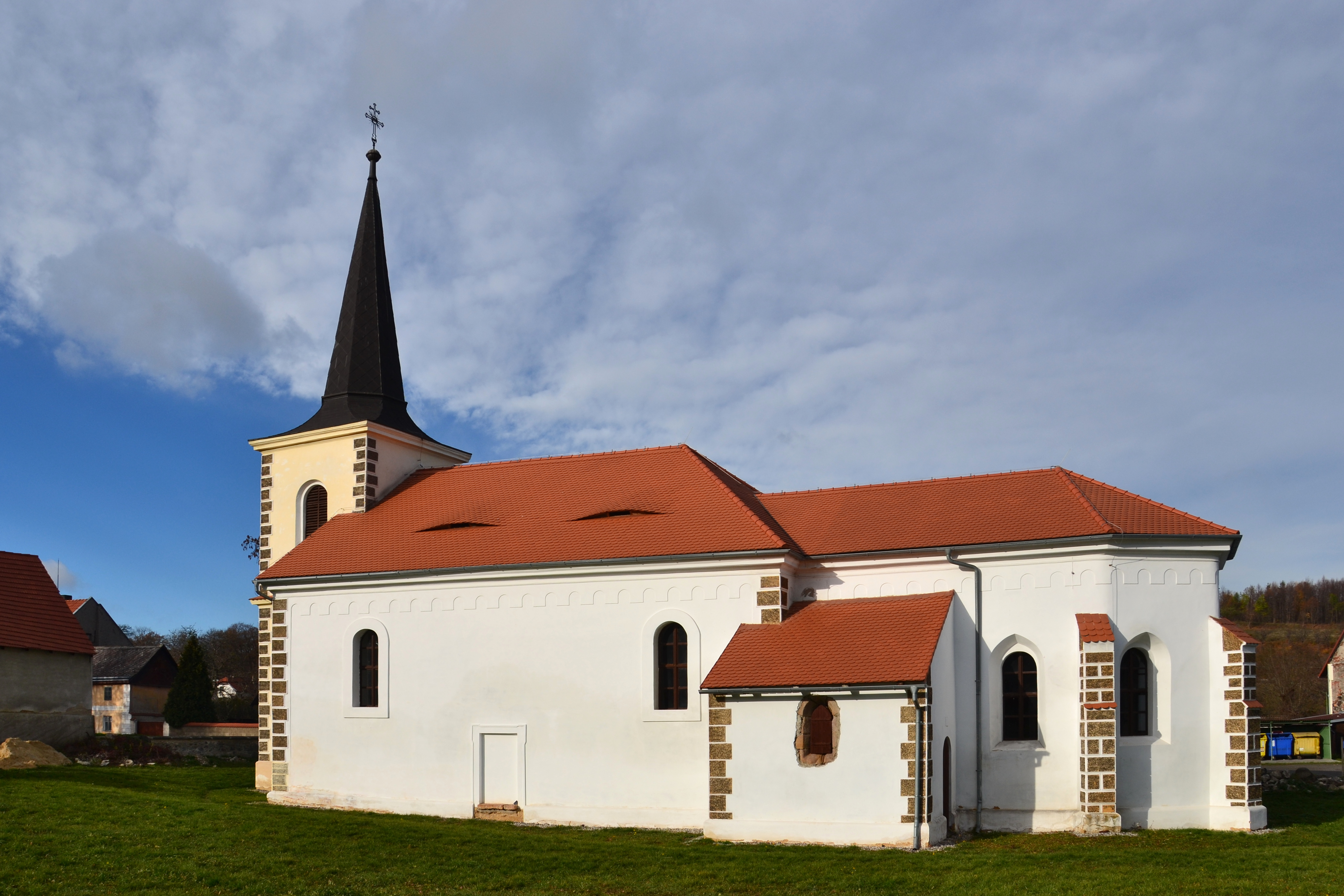
Church of Saint Barbara

The main landmark is the Mašťov Castle. It was originally a fortress from the 14th century, which was rebuilt into a Renaissance castle by the Lobkowicz family after 1571. In 1661, it was modified in the Baroque style. Today it serves as an orphanage.

The Church of the Assumption of the Virgin Mary dates from the second half of the 14th century. It was modified into its present Baroque form in 1760 and 1844.

The Church of Saint Barbara has a Gothic core from the 14th century. Its Neo-Romanesque façade dates from 1863.

The funeral chapel of the Mladota of Solopysky noble family is also a protected cultural monument. It is a late Baroque and Neoclassical building that dates from 1805 or 1806.

In the town is a Jewish cemetery, founded in the 15th century. It is among the oldest in the country.
