= Chanov housing estate =

Housing project in the Czech Republic

Coordinates: 50.5047°N 13.6776°E

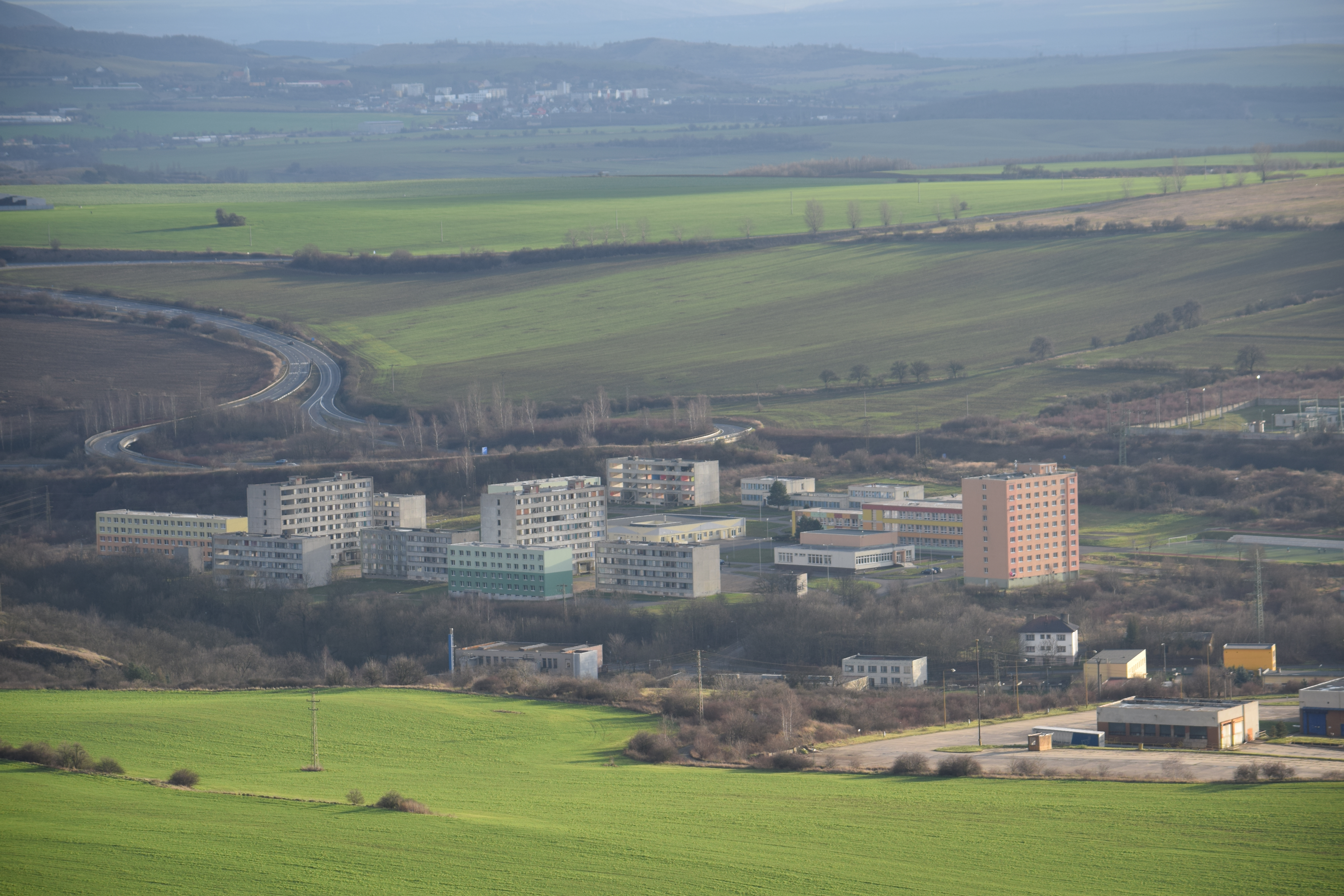
- Interactive map of Chanov housing estate

General information
- Location: Chanov, Obrnice, Most District, Ústí nad Labem Region, Czech Republic
- Population: 700 (2021)

Construction
- Constructed: 1970s-80s
- Style: Modernist

The Chanov housing estate (Czech: Sídliště Chanov) is a housing estate on the outskirts of Most in the Ústí nad Labem Region in the Czech Republic. The estate was constructed during the Czechoslovak Socialist Republic in the late 1970s as a means of housing much of the Romani population that resided in the old royal city of Most. The city was demolished during the 1970s and 1980s to extract the brown coal deposits that lay underneath. The reconstruction of the city and the necessity to relocate the Romani population gave the Communist authorities an opportunity to attempt "to transform all inhabitants into productive and modern socialist citizens". The Communists believed that moving the Roma into modern housing would end behaviour that the Communists considered "uncivilised", and resolve the so-called "Gypsy problem".

The Chanov housing estate has been perceived by many Czechs as among the worst examples of ghettoization of the Czech Romani population and has been described as "the housing estate of horror", "a hygienic timebomb", "a black stain" and the "Czech Bronx".

== Location ==
The housing estate is not located in the Chanov village itself within the Obrnice municipality, but next to the village in Most.

== Romani in the old city of Most ==
A sociological study of the Romani population of the old city of Most was published in 1975, based heavily on the results of research survey undertaken in 1972. The description of the Romani from this study formed the basis of the Communist authorities' decision to relocate Romani families once the city had been completely demolished. This sociological study was commissioned by the Most city and district national committees, and written by a team consisting of staff from, among others, the Marxism–Leninism Institute in Ústí nad Labem and the Central Committee of the Communist Party of Czechoslovakia, while the peer reviewer of the study was from the Institute of Marxism and Leninism of the Czech Technical University in Prague. According to historians, the published study revealed the "absolute ignorance" of the authors regarding the social-cultural system, traditions and contemporary problems of the Romani population, and their attitudes and findings simply reflected faithfulness to the Marxist–Leninist ideology of the Communist regime during the years of "normalisation". The Office for the Documentation and the Investigation of the Crimes of Communism report used pseudo-science to justify the state's intention to build a Romani house estate.

However, despite the questionable methodology used for the report, some of its findings were true. The study established that about 80% of the Romani who lived in Most in the 1970s moved there from impoverished encampments in Slovakia in search of work and housing during the late 1940s and the 1950s, countering the notion that Romani led a permanently nomadic lifestyle. The Communist authorities considered this a positive finding, as it raised the possibility that the Romani population would be willing to put down roots in "easily controlled urban settings". According to the 1975 report, unlike other districts in Czechoslovakia, Romani in the Most region were concentrated in towns, and a larger proportion of those living in Most were described as Category II and Category III Romani. These categories were created by the government in 1968 as a result of a national survey undertaken in 1965 of the Czechoslovak Romani population and their living conditions. This designated three categories of Romani based on how far they had adopted broader social norms and habits:

- Category I: Gypsies (the term used in the report) who no longer live in Gypsy centres, are well established within the general population, maintain basic standards of hygiene, and try to adapt to their surroundings and to housing, the workforce, attire, and housekeeping, but who need to strengthen these habits;
- Category II: Those who try to connect with the work process, acquire an apartment, learn hygienic habits and are on the path to ridding themselves of their Gypsy way of life. Families in this group mostly live in Gypsy centres and are fit for planned dispersal;
- Category III: The most backward part of the Gypsy population which lives a typical Gypsy lifestyle in Gypsy centres, had no interest in leaving this environment and worked totally unsystematically, if at all. Less politely, Category III Romani were also "described as 'recidivists, half-wits, alcoholics', criminals and jobless or uninterested in working" and who "predominated in Most district".

One of the main incentives for them to move to the industrial north of Bohemia from Slovakia was better access to better housing. They were therefore attempting to improve their standard of living, yet the apartments the migrants acquired were the lowest quality – mainly the oldest and most dilapidated apartments in the historic centre of old Most. However, the Romani themselves were mostly satisfied with these flats and considered them suitable, as the location offered more opportunities than they were used to in terms of public utilities and transport, parks, shops, and other amenities. They also had a very low level of rent, a maximum of CSK 150. This was low compared to the average family income of CSK 1,500–2,500 per month, and a quarter of all Romani families earned more than CSK 3,701 per month.

The researchers in 1972 also focused on the housing culture of the local Romani and in particular the visual presentation of their apartments. This indicated that even though most lived in apartments in a bad state of repair, two-thirds had well-equipped and well maintained premises. Six or more people usually lived in each apartment, which did not conform to the stereotype of Romani living in much larger families. Their apartments were well furnished and serviced and they expected any new apartment offered to them as a replacement to be similarly well equipped.

According to the responses of the Romani themselves to the 1972 survey, they did not live in the old town as an isolated group, but were dispersed across the city. Relations with the white population, and between the Romani themselves, were warm. The situation only deteriorated as a consequence of the concentration of Romani families by the city authorities into a few streets as the demolition of the old city progressed.

Formal education played a marginal role in traditional Romani culture and this was also true in old Most. According to the 1972 research, more than 90% had no education or incomplete primary school education. Only 5% had successfully completed primary school. Such low qualifications were reflected in the nature of their employment. Nearly all respondents who were breadwinners or head of the household classified themselves as labourers, while the rest were pensioners or homemakers. Romani in work were mostly employed by the local coal mines, the chemical plant in Záluží, or the city of Most's technical services.

== The problem of relocating Romani families from old Most ==
The Romani and non-Romani populations co-existed mostly without problems during the 1960s. However, due to the impending demolition of old Most, the District National Committee (Czech: Okresní národní výbor) in Most decided (on the basis of "Government Resolution No. 502/65", which issued instruction on priorities for addressing the way of life of the Gypsy population) to establish a timetable for the following goals:

1. dissolution of undesirable Gypsy centres
2. a plan for the immediate requirements for remedying hygiene habits and other failings in Gypsy centres
3. a plan for a comprehensive resolution to the Gypsy question in the fields of education, social security and healthcare
4. a plan for dispersing the Gypsy population within the district and the North Bohemian region.

An additional resolution No. 180/64 confirmed the gradual demolition of old Most. Thus the "Gypsy problem" became a prominent issue that required the immediate attention of the local authorities. From 1965, the authorities started moving the Romani population into the newly built parts of Most, and the old city was slowly depopulated. A substantial number of Romani remained there, however, and other Romani families from surrounding villages were relocated there as their residences were demolished to make way for mining operations. 170 families were thus concentrated in the last remaining part of old Most prior to further relocation.

Four basic alternatives were considered for the relocation of the remaining families from Old Most (known as the "gypsy problem"):

1. Dispersal of families to existing residential buildings
2. Construction of an atypical separate housing subdivision in the district
3. Construction of an atypical separate residential complex inside the city
4. Construction of a standard separate residential complex inside the city

The first alternative was used for "Category I" Romani only, who were dispersed with the majority population to the city's newly constructed buildings. One hundred and twenty-seven "disciplined" (as the local press referred to them) Romani families were relocated in this way, while another 14 "Category I" families were moved to the districts of Liberec and Česká Lípa. There were more extensive plans to move Most Romani to other North Bohemian districts such as Litoměřice and Jablonec nad Nisou, but they were vigorously resisted by the white populations in the target cities, as well as by several Most city employers, who relied on local Romani as a source of manual labour.

Another option was the relocation of most of the remaining Romani to existing houses in Obrnice u Mostu, while the rest would be moved to older houses in the new parts of Most. However, the residents of Obrnice refused to live with such a large group of Romani, and the Romani themselves also rejected this option.

The second proposal was to build a separate residential complex in Sedlec, but this was rejected by the Romani themselves, as they considered it too isolated from the town, and would concentrate too many Romani in a small area. They also made many demands, such as the construction of individual family houses, which the authorities would not meet.

The third potential alternative was the construction of a stand-alone suburban housing estate with four-storey prefabricated panelled housing blocks with 284 apartments for "Category II" and "Category III" Romani, which would also house white citizens with a "lower housing culture". The centre of the new apartments would be a large kitchen, and they were designed to be adaptable for larger families. This design never came to fruition, however, as the results of the 1972 sociological research had convinced the authorities that building an atypical housing estate would be a backwards step in terms of integration of the Romani population. Thus the Communist authorities' preferred solution was the fourth alternative of building a standalone housing estate of standard apartment blocks in either Rudolice or Chanov.

== The construction of the Chanov housing estate ==
The decision to concentrate the remaining 170 Most Romani families in Chanov was in direct conflict with the policy to disperse Romani more widely within the rest of the population. However, the local city authorities required an urgent solution because of the immediate need to demolish the old city and the reluctance of other towns and districts to help, and so the building of a separate housing estate in Chanov was judged to be the "least bad" and "only possible" option.

The original plan was for the apartment buildings to be constructed according to the highest government specifications, as the high quality interiors and furniture would help ensure the "re-education of Gypsies from the youngest generation". These plans included 12 residential blocks, a large local supermarket, a kindergarten for 120 children, a primary school with 10 classrooms and dining facilities, a health clinic and a restaurant with entertainment facilities. A branch of the local police was also planned for security purposes. The plans were approved in 1975 and began to be implemented from January 1976.

However, construction was delayed, and the original plans were revised to include another block with smaller apartments. Furthermore, construction of all the social utilities was seriously delayed, and they did not become available until several months after the first inhabitants had moved in. For example, the entire ground floor of block 7 had to be temporarily removed from the housing stock to provide premises for a market, the school, administration offices, the health clinic, and facilities for public transport staff. Meanwhile, children who had already been moved to Chanov had to be transported back to old Most by bus each day to attend school.

== The arrival of new tenants ==
The first new tenants in Chanov received the keys to their new apartments in March 1978, and all apartments had been handed over by the end of May. In each case the handover was accompanied by instructions on the basic rules of living in co-existence with others, how to use the apartments and how to observe the house rules.

Moving to Chanov from old Most was a painful experience for many of the new inhabitants, as the majority had not wanted to move, despite the fact that they had lived in dilapidated conditions in the old city. Many tried to stay in their old apartments for as long as possible, but most families eventually reconciled themselves to the move. Although they were impressed by the apartments themselves, they were unhappy at the cost of their new apartments, which was in many cases three or four times their previous rent, and the behaviour of some of their new neighbours.

Initially Chanov was not exclusively a Romani estate. In accordance with the original plans, white families had also been offered apartments there, but most refused them when they found out the estate would mainly house Romani. Those who accepted the apartments moved into three of the original blocks while Romani families occupied the other nine. Many of the white families were unable to come to terms with living in coexistence with their Romani neighbours and before long almost all of them had moved out. Their vacated apartments were given to other Romani families, not only from old Most but also other towns, and Chanov thus became known as a "Gypsy ghetto".

Despite the difficult period of acclimatisation to the new environment and lifestyle, the early days of the estate were calm and relatively harmonious. However, problems soon occurred due to the wide variations in lifestyle, standard of living, social status, level of wealth, and familial and group affiliations among the Romani families who had moved into Chanov.

For some of the new inhabitants the housing itself was a problem. In old Most they were used to low category apartments in which they burned coal. Modern top category apartments with central heating were a complete novelty for them. This has been cited as one of the reasons for the ensuing devastation of the housing stock in Chanov – as people were unable to make good use of the modern apartments, they thus adapted them to how they thought they should be.

Even though most inhabitants knew each other from old Most, relations between individual families were not always warm. This factor was taken into consideration during the 1972 study, in which respondents were asked: "Who would you definitely want/not want to live with in one house?". Evaluation of answers to this question was not published in the study, but was available to the city authorities. However, they chose not to use it when allocating the apartments to families, which may have given rise to many conflicts in the apartment buildings.

Another negative factor affecting new residents was the isolation of the housing estate, which is 1 km from the new city of Most. All free-time activities were thus limited to the area of the estate. Many older Romani responded by withdrawing into themselves and avoiding social contact with others, while the rest attempted to create their own entertainment inside the estate.
