= Chanov =

Chanov (Russian: Чанов) is a Russian masculine surname, its feminine counterpart is Chanova. It may refer to

- Viktor Chanov (1959–2017), Ukrainian football goalkeeper
- Vyacheslav Chanov (born 1951), Russian-Ukrainian football coach and a former goalkeeper, brother of Viktor

== See also ==
- Chanov housing estate in the Czech Republic
