= Most (city) =

City in Ústí nad Labem Region, Czech Republic

- Statutory city
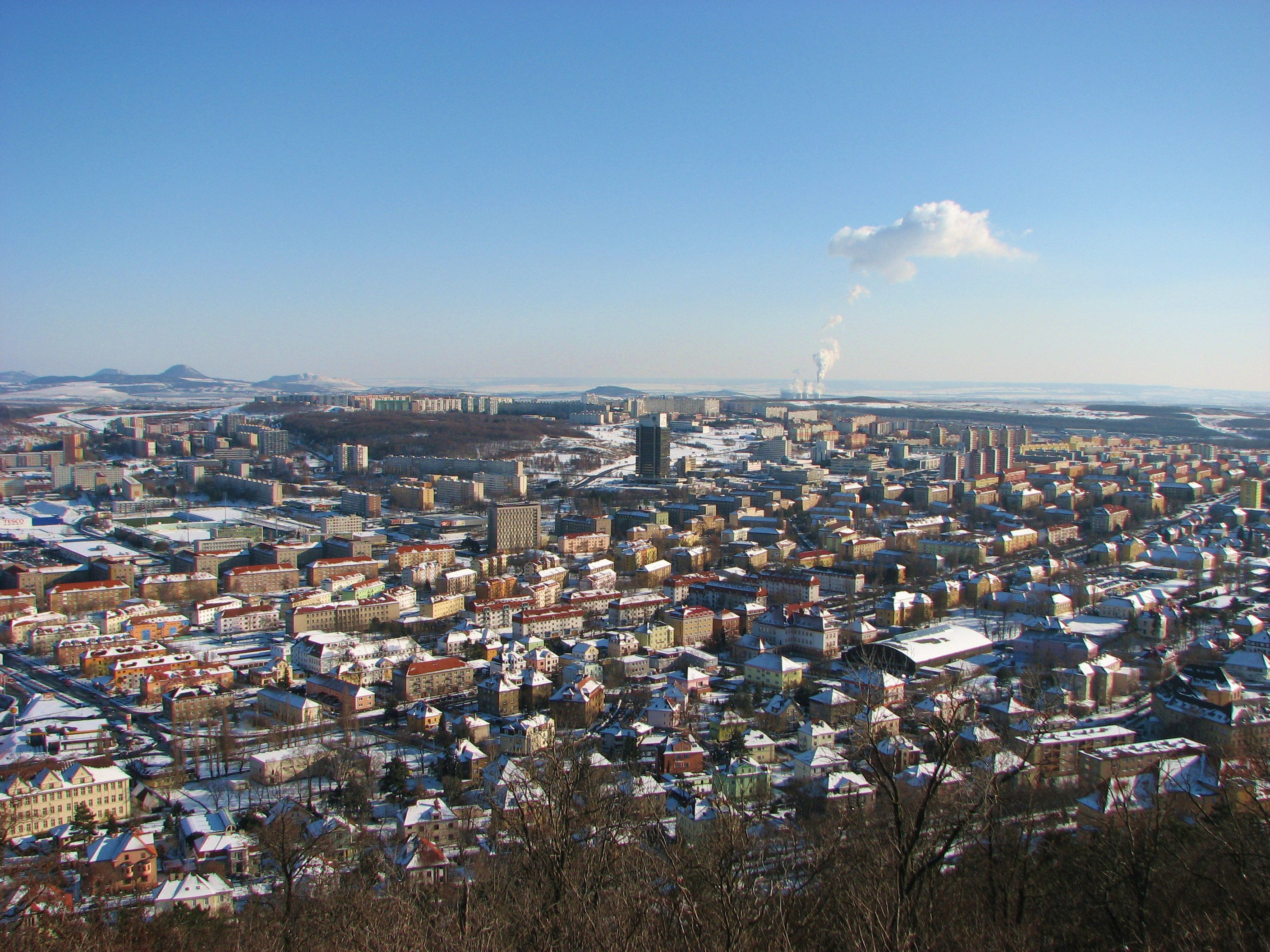
- View of the city from Hněvín Castle

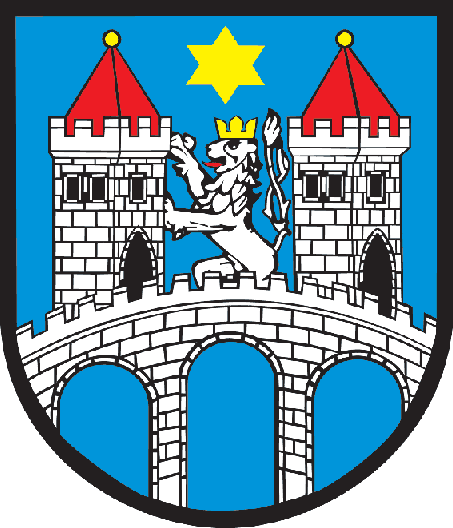
- Flag Coat of arms

- Location in the Czech Republic
- Coordinates: 50°30′11″N 13°38′12″E
- Country: Czech Republic
- Region: Ústí nad Labem
- District: Most
- First mentioned: 1040

Government
  - Mayor: Marek Hrvol (ProMost)

Area
  - Total: 86.94 km^{2} (33.57 sq mi)
- Elevation: 233 m (764 ft)

Population (2026-01-01)
  - Total: 63,160
  - Density: 726.5/km^{2} (1,882/sq mi)
- Time zone: UTC+1 (CET)
  - Summer (DST): UTC+2 (CEST)
- Postal code: 434 01
- Website: www.mesto-most.cz

Most (Czech pronunciation: [ˈmost]; German: Brüx) is a city in the Ústí nad Labem Region of the Czech Republic. It has about 63,000 inhabitants. The city is located on the Bílina River, on the border between the Most Basin and Central Bohemian Uplands.

Most was founded in the 11th century at the latest and became a town in the 13th century. In the 19th century, Most transformed into an industrial city known for lignite mining. Under communist rule, the historic city was demolished and replaced by a planned city in order to facilitate strip mining. In locations where mining has ended, Most is an example of successful landscape revitalisation. Most Lake, created by the flooding of a lignite mine, is the second largest artificial lake in the Czech Republic. The most valuable monument of Most is the Church of the Assumption of the Virgin Mary.

== Administrative division ==
Most consists of eight municipal parts (in brackets population according to the 2021 census):

- Most (58,591)
- Čepirohy (462)
- Komořany (4)
- Rudolice (234)
- Souš (543)
- Starý Most (45)
- Velebudice (227)
- Vtelno (840)

== Etymology ==
The name Most means 'bridge' in Czech. It first appeared as translation of the German name "Brüx" (derived from the German word for 'bridge', Brücke). The city was named after the system of bridges that crossed the swamps in this area in the 10th century.

== Geography ==
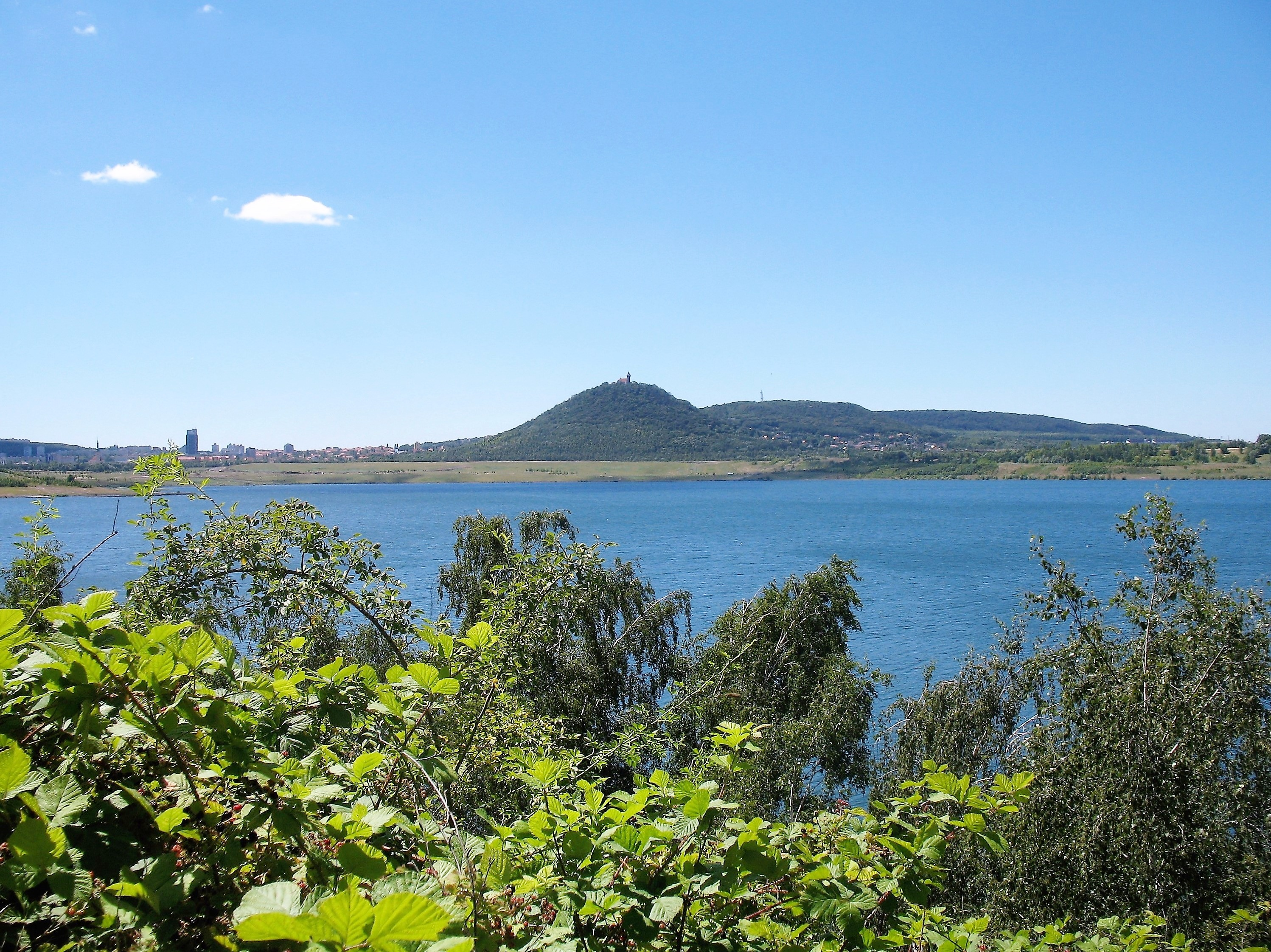
View from Most Lake towards Hněvín and the city

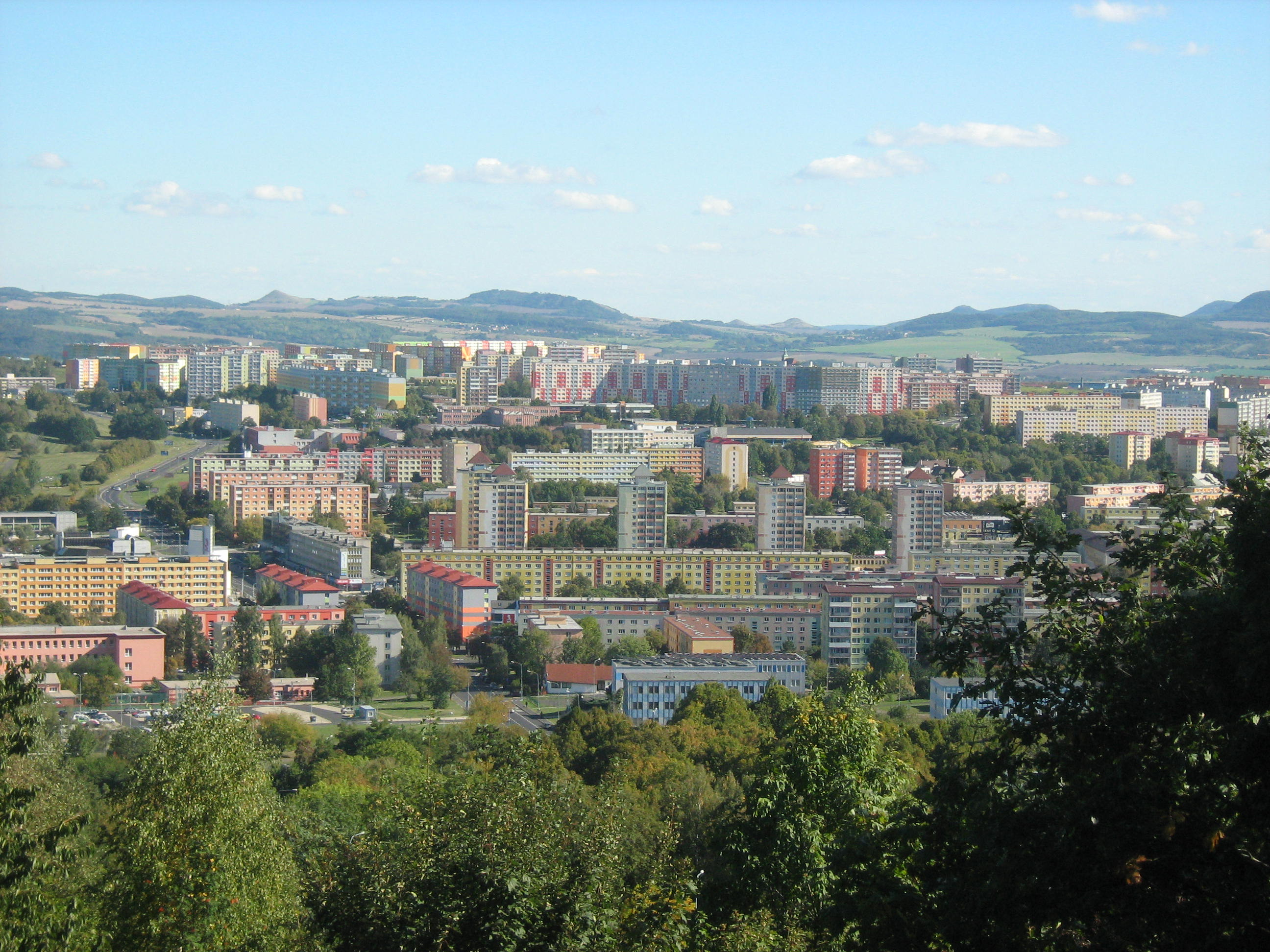
View of Most from Ressl Hill

Most is located about 33 kilometres (21 mi) southwest of Ústí nad Labem and 70 km (43 mi) northwest of Prague. It lies on the border between the Most Basin and Central Bohemian Uplands. The highest point is the hill Ressl at 413 m (1,355 ft) above sea level. The Bílina River flows through the city.

There are several artificial lakes created during land rehabilitation after coal mining. The largest of them is Most Lake, created in 2008–2012. With an area of 309.4 ha (765 acres), it is the second largest artificial lake in the country. It is mainly used for sports and recreation. The second notable lake in the centre of Most is Matylda Lake, also used for sports and recreation. It was infused in 1992 and has an area of 38.7 ha (96 acres).

== History ==
=== 11th–15th centuries ===
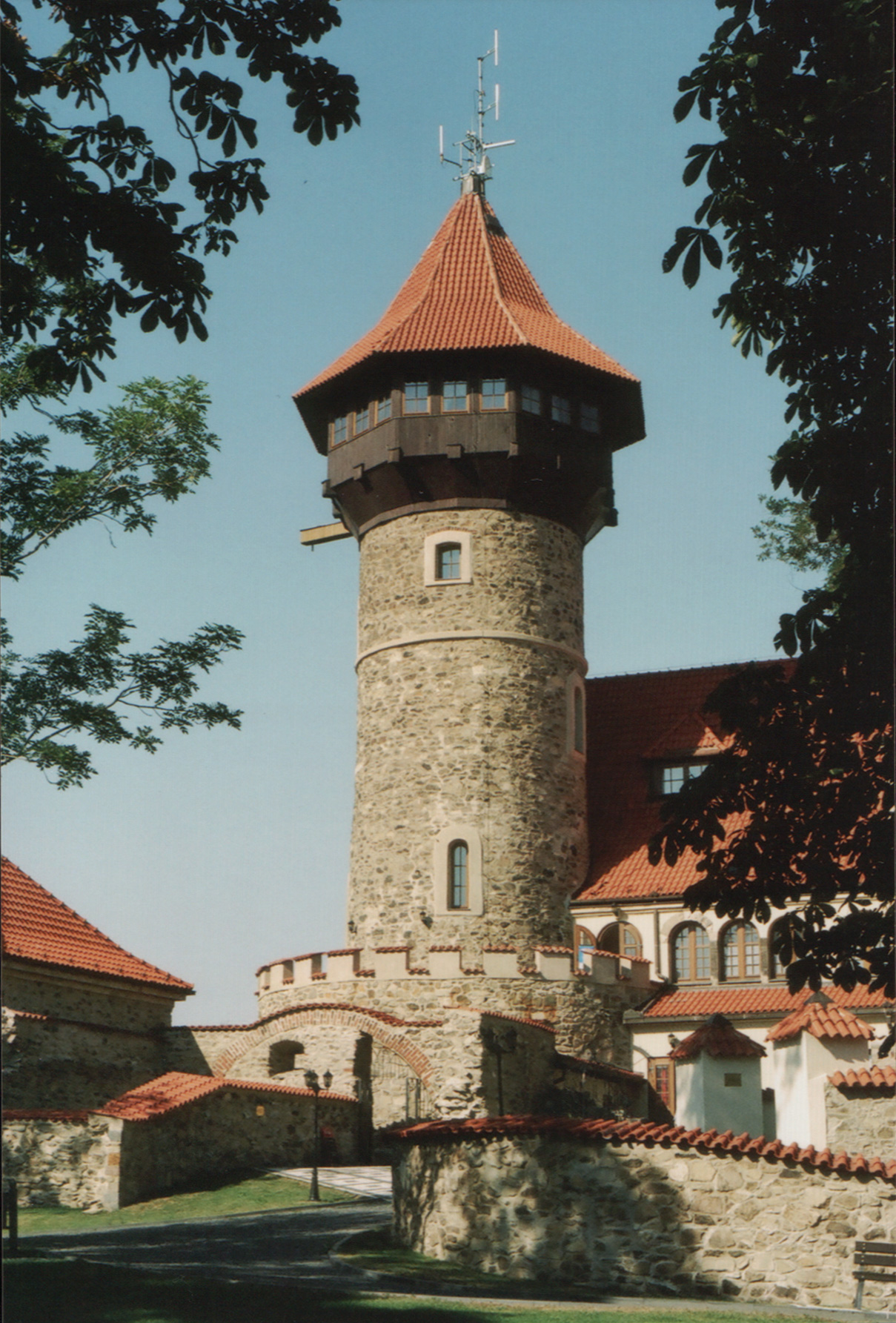
Lookout tower of the rebuilt Hněvín

The first written mention of Most is from 1040, when it was mentioned in Latin Chronica Boemorum as Gnevin Pons ('Hněvín bridge'). From the end of the 12th century, the Hrabišic dynasty began to colonise the territory and established here a stronghold. Most was originally a market village at the crossroads of old trade routes. After 1210, the village was moved to the other bank of the river Bílina.

In 1227 Kojata, the last Hrabišic, passed his property to the Zderaz Monastery, but King Wenceslaus I used the right of escheat and took Most from the monastery. Hněvín Castle was built on the site of the old stronghold in 1238–1248. After 1240, Most acquired the character of a town. It was first referred to as a town in 1247. In the mid-13th century, it was promoted to a royal city. King Ottokar II granted the city further privileges in 1273. The city developed rapidly and benefited from its advantageous location near the kingdom's borders and on an important road.

During the reign of next kings, the city continued to prosper. In 1321, 1334, 1395 and 1455, the city was damaged by fires. In 1374, Charles IV granted Most the vineyard right, wine has probably been produced here since the 12th century. In the mid-14th century, the city walls were finished. The prosperity ended with the Hussite Wars but in both 1421 and 1424 the city withstood the Hussite siege. Most recovered thanks to the trade route of international importance and thanks to the start of iron ore mining in the nearby Ore Mountains.

=== 16th–17th centuries ===
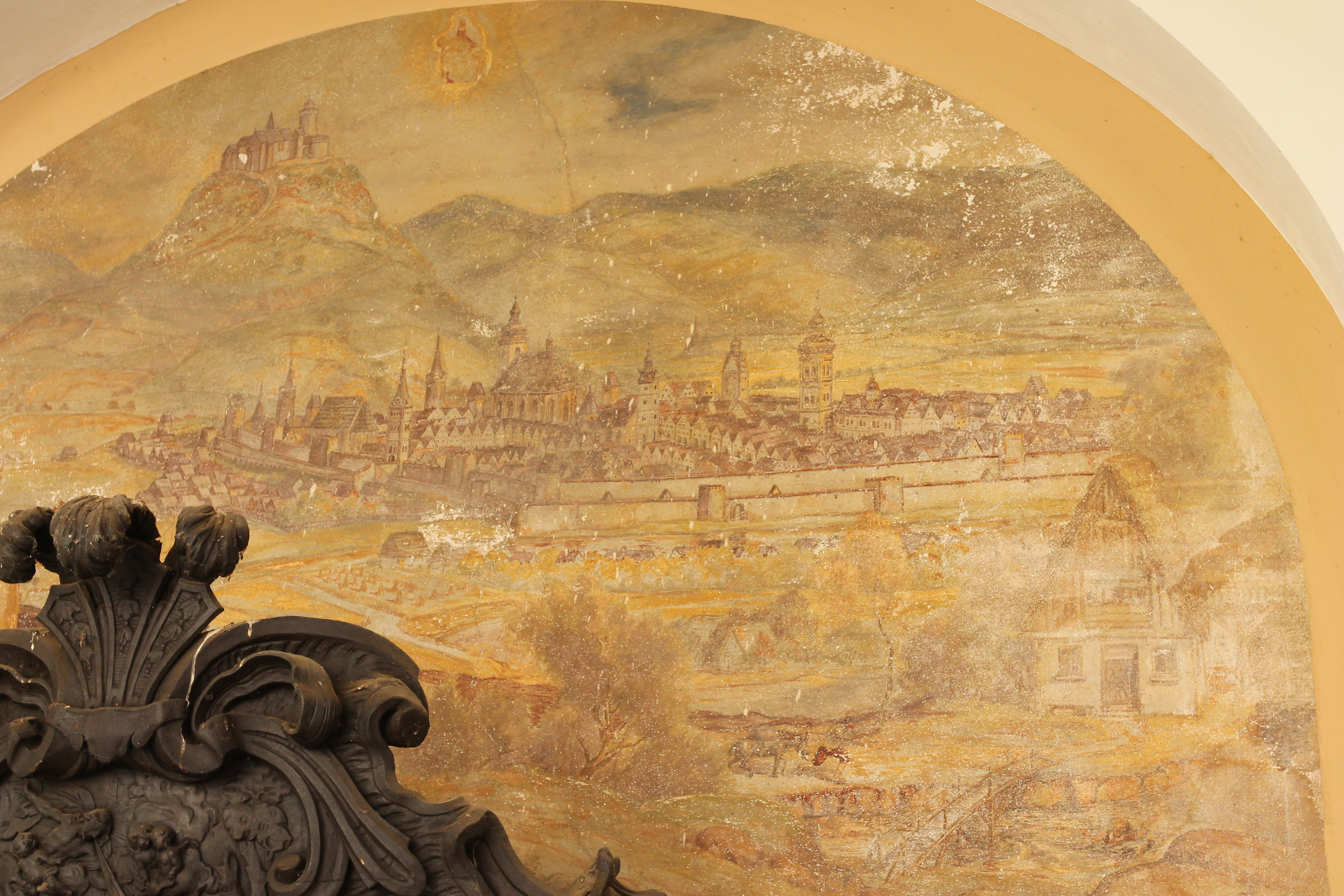
Baroque fresco depicting the city at the pilgrimage church in Krupka-Bohosudov

In 1515, the worst fire in its history hit the city, damaging the church built in 1253–1257 and the town hall. Construction of the new church began in 1517, and the new Renaissance city hall was built before 1553. In the second half of the 16th century, the crisis was deepened by crop failures, loans to the king, plague, famine, further fires and Turkish wars. Most went into debt and paid off the debts for the next hundred years. In 1595, the city bought the Hněvín Castle from Emperor Rudolf II and other estates.

In 1639–1648, during the Thirty Years' War, the city was occupied by Swedish troops because of the Hněvín Castle. After the Thirty Years' War, the city lost much of its economic and political significance. So that the castle would no longer be a reason to besiege the city, the inhabitants of Most asked Emperor Ferdinand III to demolish the castle. The demolition took place in 1651–1653.

=== 18th–19th centuries ===
Huge reserves of coal were discovered in the 18th century. Most was affected by the Silesian Wars when the city had to pay war contributions. After the city's economic conditions were consolidated in the second half of the 18th century, Most was affected by the passage of Napoleon's army at the beginning of the 19th century. In the first half of the 19th century, the medieval wall were demolished. In 1820, Most was hit by another big fire.

At the beginning of the 19th century, mining of lignite was started. Industrialisation began and the turning point was the construction of the railway in 1870, which brought connection with coal outlets. The last quarter of the 19th century saw a rapid increase in the number of inhabitants and newly built apartments, and there was an influx of the Czech population. A sugar factory, a porcelain factory, a steel factory, a brewery and a city museum were built.

=== 20th century ===
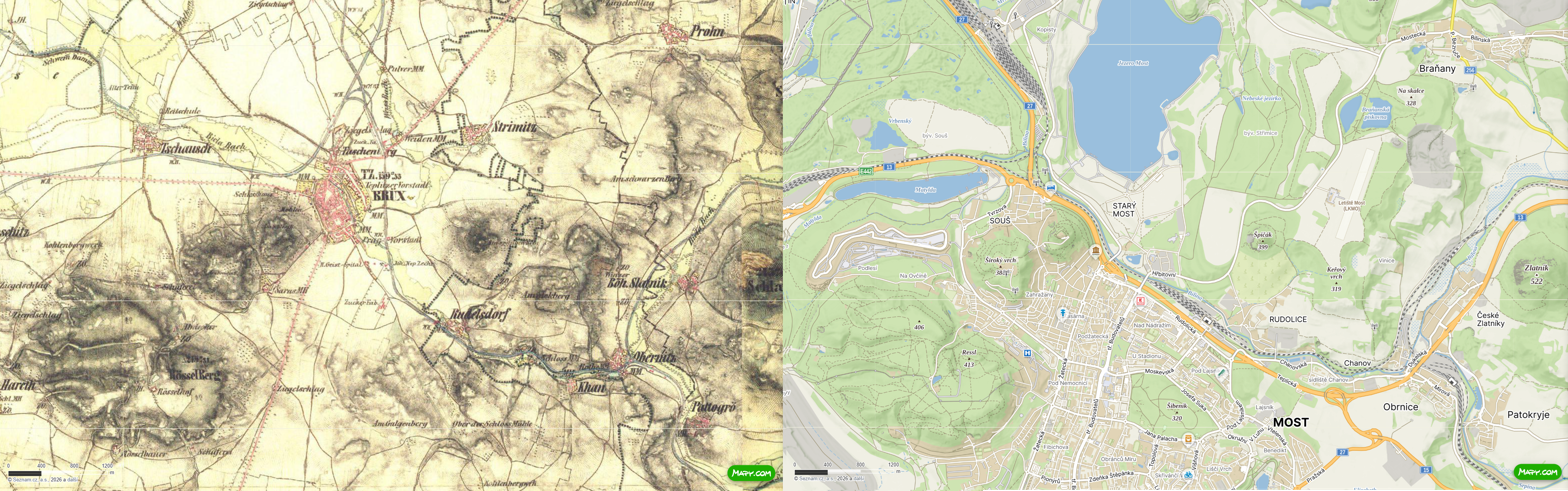
A comparison of the city centre in c. 1840s and in 2026

In 1938, Most was annexed by Nazi Germany. Under German occupation from 1938 until 1945, the city was administered as a part of the Regierungsbezirk Aussig of the Reichsgau Sudetenland. In 1944, there was a subcamp of the Flossenbürg concentration camp providing forced labor in coal mines outside Most. The prisoners were mostly Poles. Most was repeatedly bombed during the Oil Campaign of World War II. The Germans also operated a Gestapo prison in the city.

After the war, Most was restored to Czechoslovakia. The German-speaking population was expelled in accordance with the Potsdam Agreement and the city was resettled by Czechs.

In 1964, the Czechoslovak Communist government decided to demolish the historic Most due to the expansion of coal mining, including the Gothic city centre, the brewery founded in 1470, the 1910 theatre, and the cemetery established in 1853. Only the Church of the Assumption of the Virgin Mary was saved. The destruction of the historic city began in 1965 and was finished in 1985. Simultaneously with the start of mining, a new city began to emerge, with the first building finished in 1971. Newly built, standardised blocks of flats (paneláks) followed brutalist architecture common for that era. The destruction of Most brought monetary profit to the state as coal was mined in the locality for an estimated 3 billion CSK.

Construction of the new City Hall began in 1972 and was completed in 1977 after construction delays.

The Ležáky coal mine in the place of the historic Most was closed in 1999. Most Lake was created in that location, by filling the former coal mine by water from the Ohře River. It was opened to the public in 2020.

== Demographics ==
Most has a significant Romani community, concentrated especially in the Chanov housing estate.

Historical population

Year	Pop.	±%
1869	11,262	—
1880	18,649	+65.6%
1890	27,292	+46.3%
1900	40,701	+49.1%
1910	48,621	+19.5%

Year	Pop.	±%
1921	51,727	+6.4%
1930	56,751	+9.7%
1950	46,328	−18.4%
1961	56,857	+22.7%
1970	61,158	+7.6%

Year	Pop.	±%
1980	61,543	+0.6%
1991	70,670	+14.8%
2001	68,263	−3.4%
2011	65,193	−4.5%
2021	61,306	−6.0%

Source: Censuses

== Economy ==
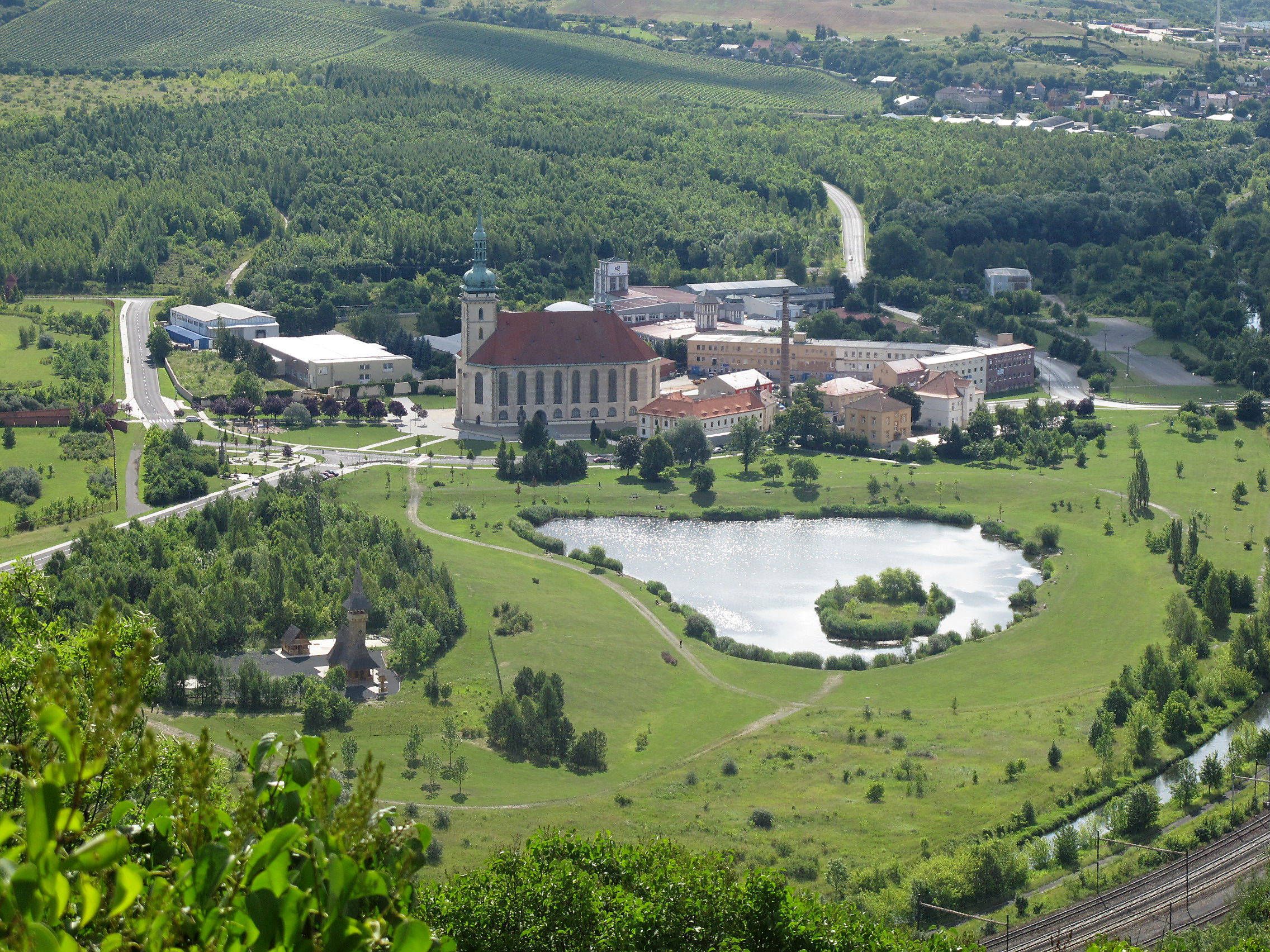
Revitalised land around the Church of the Assumption of the Virgin Mary

Most lies on the edge of the Most Basin and is an important lignite-mining region. Since the discovery of huge reserves of coal, the city has been shaped by mining. It caused an influx of residents and the development of other industries, but it also caused the destruction of historic parts of the city. The mining industry still employs hundreds of people; the largest employer in the city is Czech Coal Group.

The Komořany power plant is linked to coal mining. It is a large lignite power plant with a total installed electrical output of 239 MWe, built in 1955–1958.

In addition to mining, heavy industry and chemistry were developed in Most, but in the 21st century they are replaced by services in the composition of the city's economy. The mining segment operates not only in the form of coal mining, but also in the framework of extensive land rehabilitation. The cultivation of wine and fruit was also restored. The recultivation of the landscape in the vicinity of Most is unique and appreciated as an effective and sensitive revitalisation of the landscape, which is a model for further recultivations. The ouskirts of Most have become attractive for tourism.

== Transport ==
Most is located on the railway lines Prague–Cheb, Kadaň–Děčín, Most–Rakovník and Louny–Osek. In addition to the main railway station, the area of Most is also served by the stops Most-Kopisty and Třebušice are also located in the municipal territory.

The city operates a transport company together with the neighbouring town of Litvínov. In addition to buses, there is also the Most–Litvínov tramway network.

== Culture ==
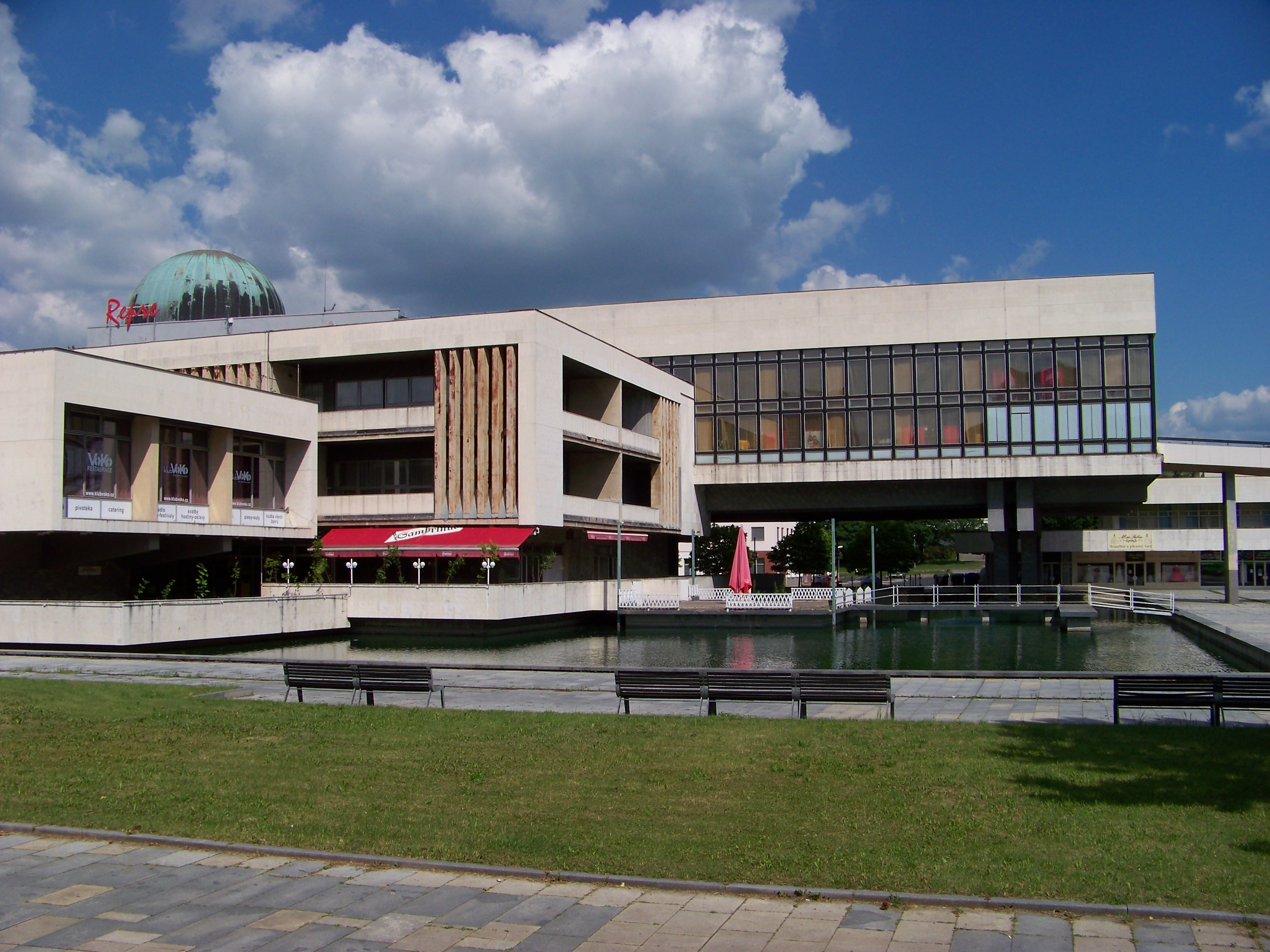
Repre House of Culture

The construction of the Repre House of Culture (originally called "Regional House of Culture of Miners and Energy Workers") started in 1972, but was not completed until 2 June 1984. The building includes a planetarium located on the roof sphere, a cinema and numerous rooms and halls. The city sold the building to the private sector in 2010 and has been subject to numerous replacement and refurbishment proposals.

The new theatre was planned for the new city centre from the late 1960s, but construction did not commence until 1979 and was opened on 7 November 1985. Designed by Ivo Klimeš following his completion winning design in 1969, it features a 500 seat auditorium and was called Divadlo Pracujících ("Theatre of the Working People") until 1990.

== Education ==
Three universities have detached workplaces in Most: Czech University of Life Sciences Prague, VSB – Technical University of Ostrava, and University of Finance and Administration.

== Sport ==
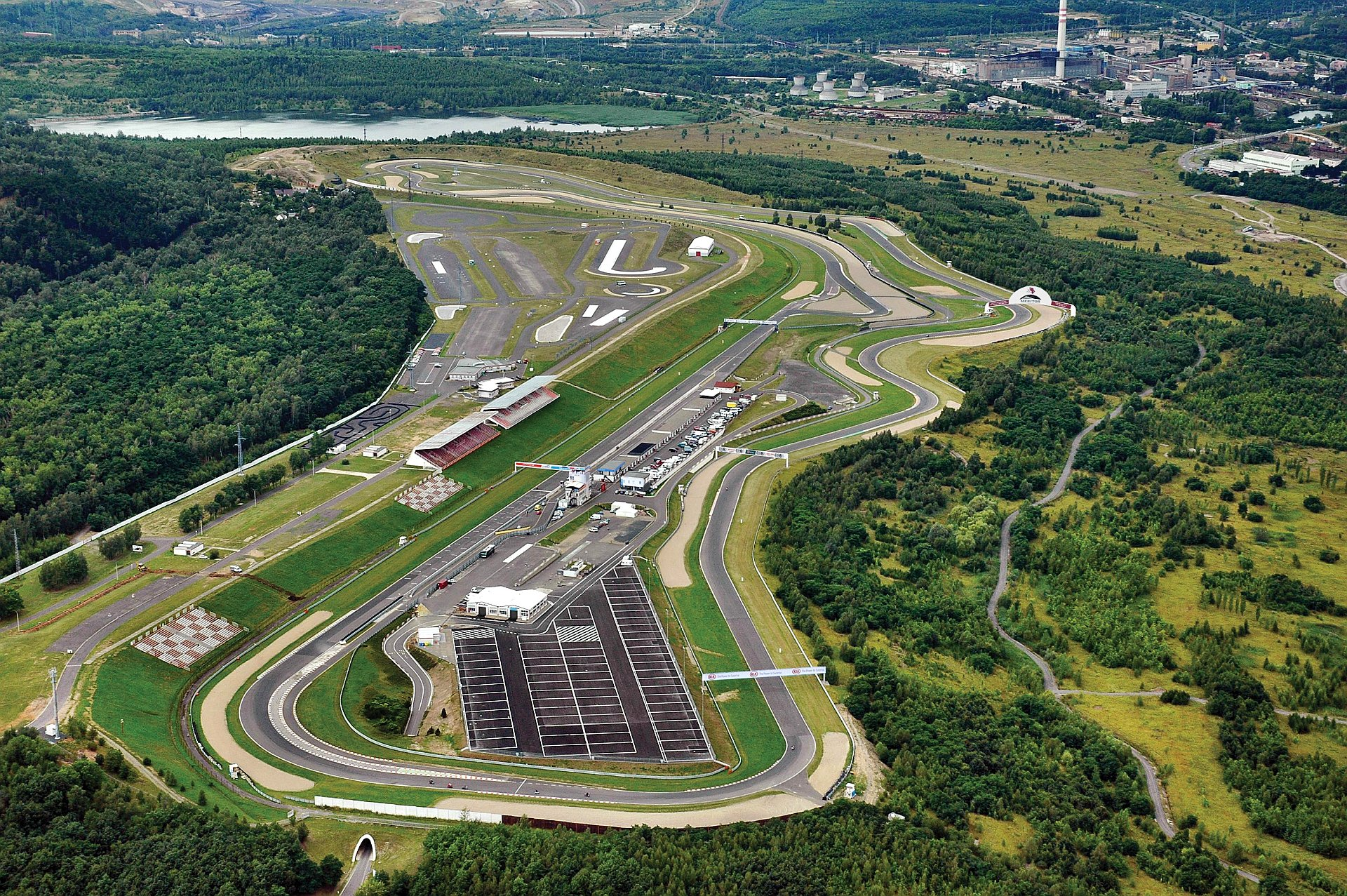
Most Autodrom

The local football club FK Baník Most 1909 existed for more than 100 years and used to play in the top tier of Czech football, but it was disestablished in 2016. The city is now represented by FK Baník Most-Souš, playing in the Bohemian Football League (the third tier of Czech football).

Most Hippodrome is located in the Velebudice part of Most. The city hosts eight horse racing days per year, and is thus one of the leading horse racing locations in the region. The area with the race track was created during the reclamation of the landscape and is also used for other sports and cultural events.

Most is known for Autodrom Most, a race track for motorsport opened in 1983.

Aquadrom Most is a water park located in the centre of Most.

== Sights ==
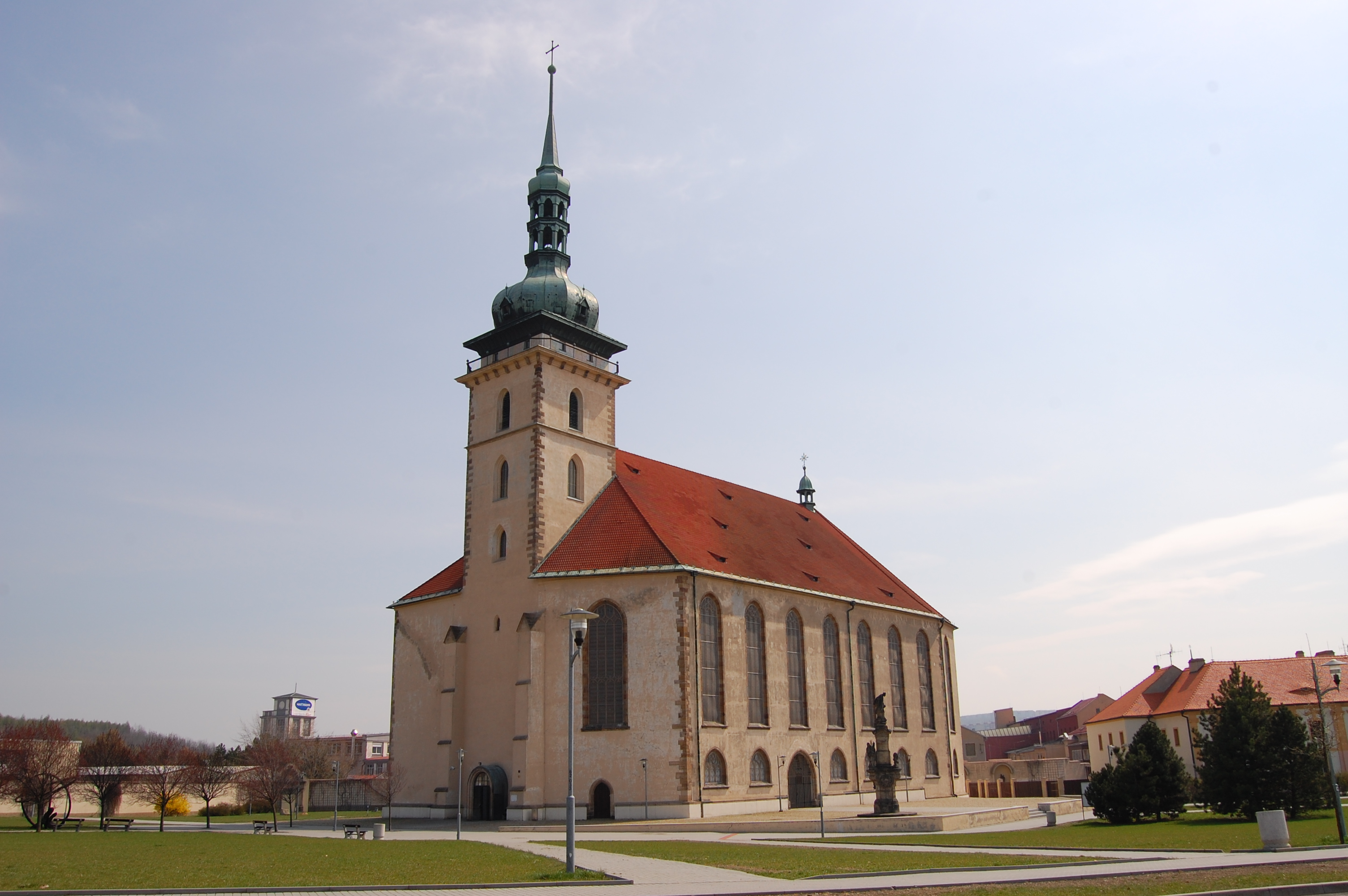
Church of the Assumption of the Virgin Mary

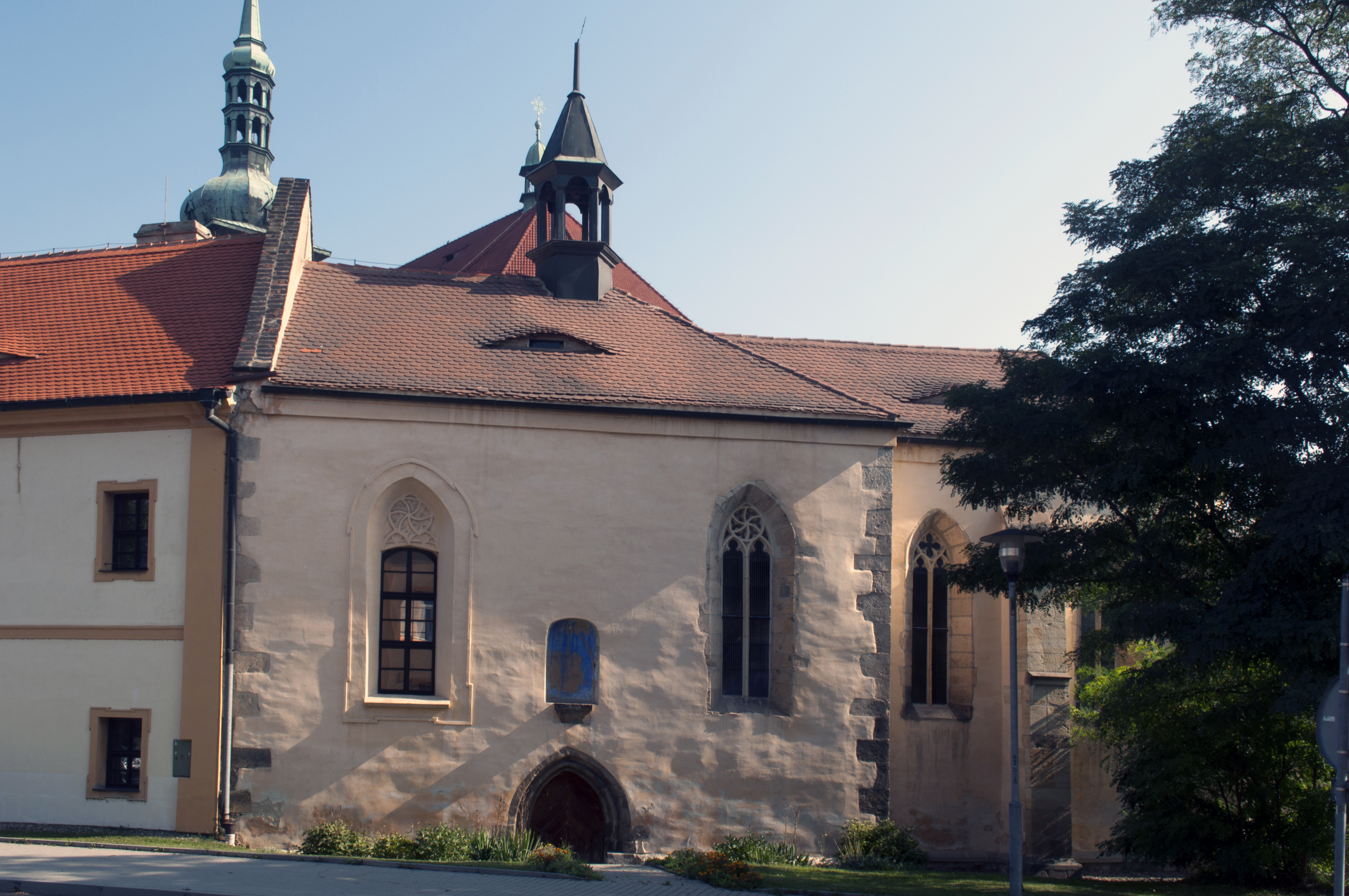
Church of the Holy Spirit

Hněvín Castle belongs to the main landmarks of the city. After the original castle was demolished in 1651–1653, the current romantic castle was built as a copy of it. Its main part is a stone lookout tower, built in 1900.

The most important monument is the Gothic Church of the Assumption of the Virgin Mary. It was built in 1517–1602, after the old city church was destroyed by a huge fire in 1515. The church became famous when it was moved 841.1 m (2,760 ft) away to the newly constructed town in 1975, due to the demolition of the historic centre of the old town. The move took 28 days to complete with an average speed of 2.16 cm (0.85 in) per minute. The Czechoslovak government took pride in the relocation of this religious structure, and the building was mentioned in the Golden Guinness Book Of World Records as the heaviest building ever moved on wheels.

The oldest preserved building in Most is the Church of the Holy Spirit. It was probably built in the 1320s and first documented in 1351. The church is small, but it is very valuable due to its preservation and pure Gothic style. After the move of the Church of the Assumption of the Virgin Mary, the churches found themselves next to each other. Today the Church of the Holy Spirit has been desecrated and exhibitions and classical music concerts take place in its premises.

In Vtelno is the Church of the Exaltation of the Holy Cross. It was built in the Baroque style in 1736–1738.

Among the other monuments are the building of the Regional Museum in Most, Neorenaissance fountain, plague column with the sculptural group of St. Anne, set of Stations of the Cross, and Jewish cemetery in Souš.

== In popular culture ==
Most was nationwide popularised by successful TV series Most! (2018). It used to be a popular location for filming foreign war films, particularly as period buildings could be realistically exploded for the cameras. Several films were shot here, including The Bridge at Remagen (1969), Slaughterhouse-Five (1972), All Quiet on the Western Front (1979) and Battle of Moscow (1985), and Czech films The Joke (1969), Something Like Happiness (2005), Dolls (2007) and ROMing (2007).

== Notable people ==
- Hans Dernschwam (1494 – c. 1568), humanist, traveller and chronicler
- Andreas Hammerschmidt (c. 1611 – 1675), composer
- Florian Leopold Gassmann (1729–1774), composer
- Václav Jansa (1859–1913), painter and illustrator
- Rudolf Ritter (1878–1966), tenor
- Wenzel Hablik (1881–1934), painter and architect
- Raoul Schránil (1910–1998), actor
- Heini Halberstam (1926–2014), mathematician
- Judita Čeřovská (1929–2001), singer
- Josef Masopust (1931–2015), football player and coach
- Olga Fikotová (1932–2024), Czech-American discus thrower, Olympic winner
- Jan Mühlstein (born 1949), politician
- Pavel Chaloupka (born 1959), football player
- Vladimír Růžička (born 1963), ice hockey player
- Libor Pimek (born 1963), tennis player
- Petr Svoboda (born 1966), ice hockey player
- Bedrich Benes (born 1967), computer scientist
- Martin Ručinský (born 1971), ice hockey player
- Jan Vopat (born 1973), ice hockey player
- Dragan J. Vučićević (born 1973), Serbian journalist
- Martin Vohánka (born 1975), entrepreneur and philanthropist
- Petr Franěk (born 1975), ice hockey player
- Vlastimil Kroupa (born 1975), ice hockey player
- Petr Johana (born 1976), football player
- Marek Židlický (born 1977), ice hockey player
- Pavel Rosa (born 1977), ice hockey player
- Kamil Piroš (born 1978), ice hockey player
- Tomáš Divíšek (born 1979), ice hockey player
- Markéta Jánská (born 1981), model
- Tomáš Kůrka (born 1981), ice hockey player
- Iveta Benešová (born 1983), tennis player
- Lukáš Kašpar (born 1985), ice hockey player

== Twin towns – sister cities ==
Most is twinned with:

- Marienberg, Germany
- Meppel, Netherlands
- Pezinok, Slovakia
- Veszprém, Hungary

== Gallery ==
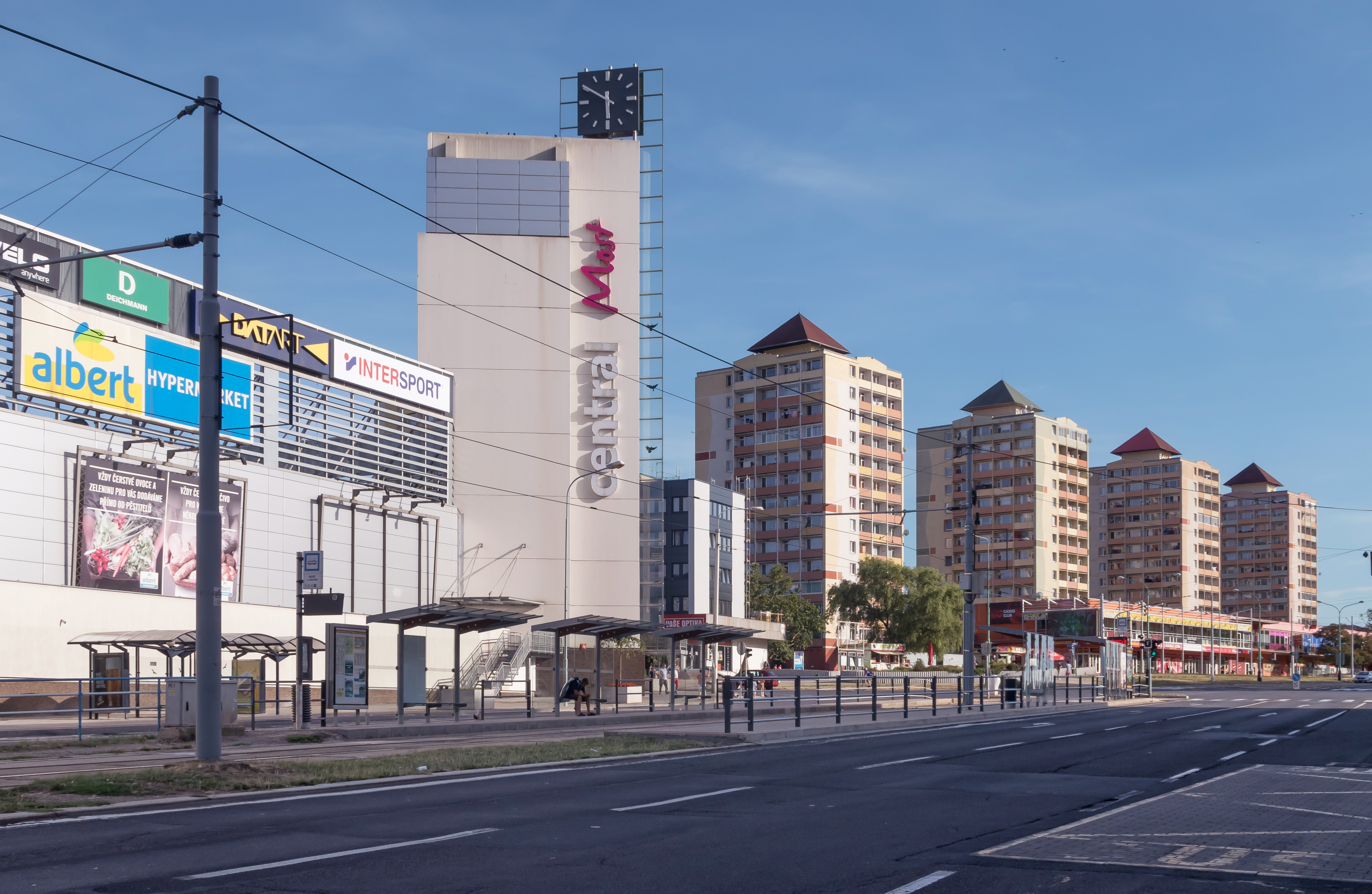
Budovatelů Street

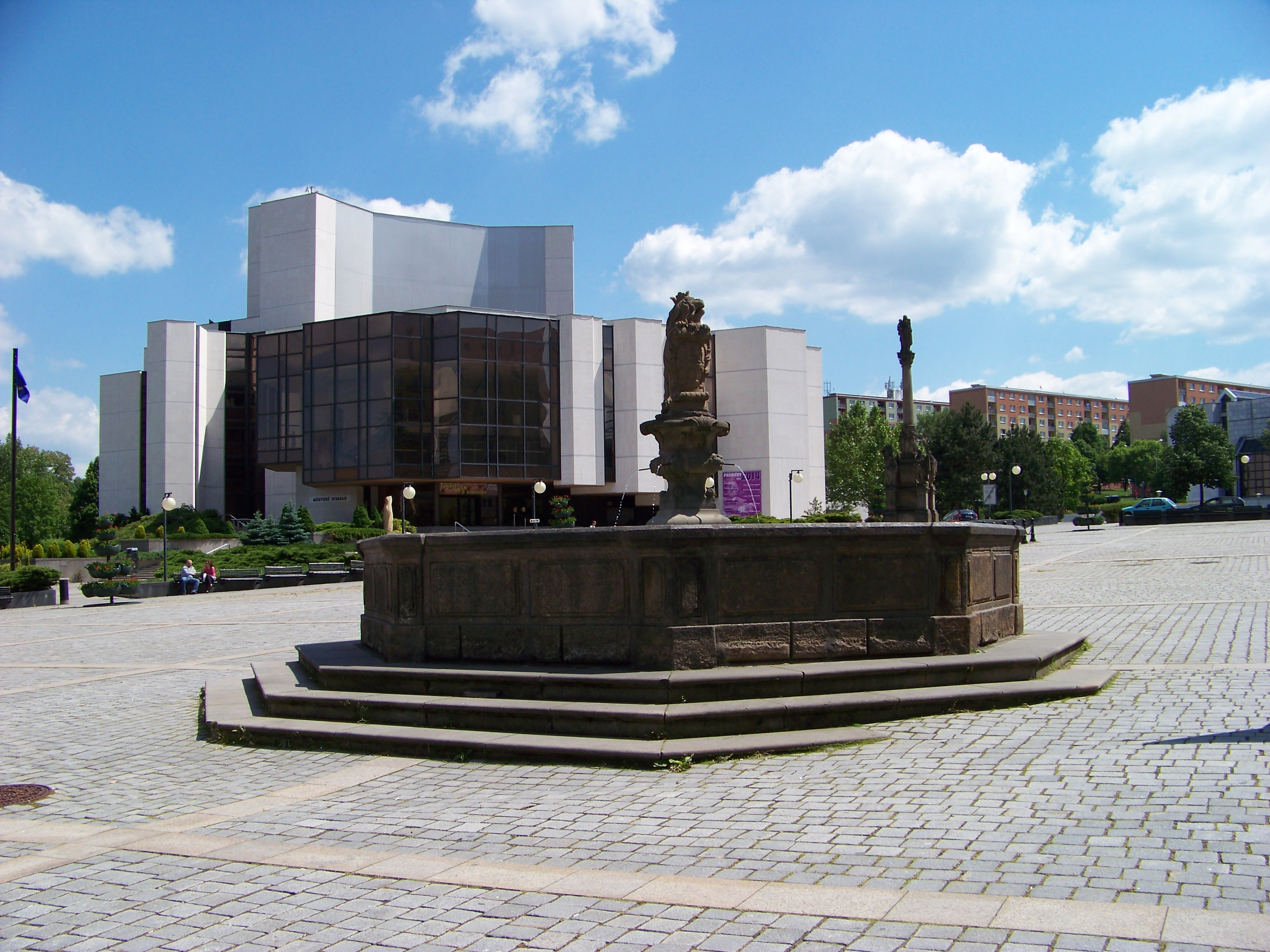
Fountain and city theatre

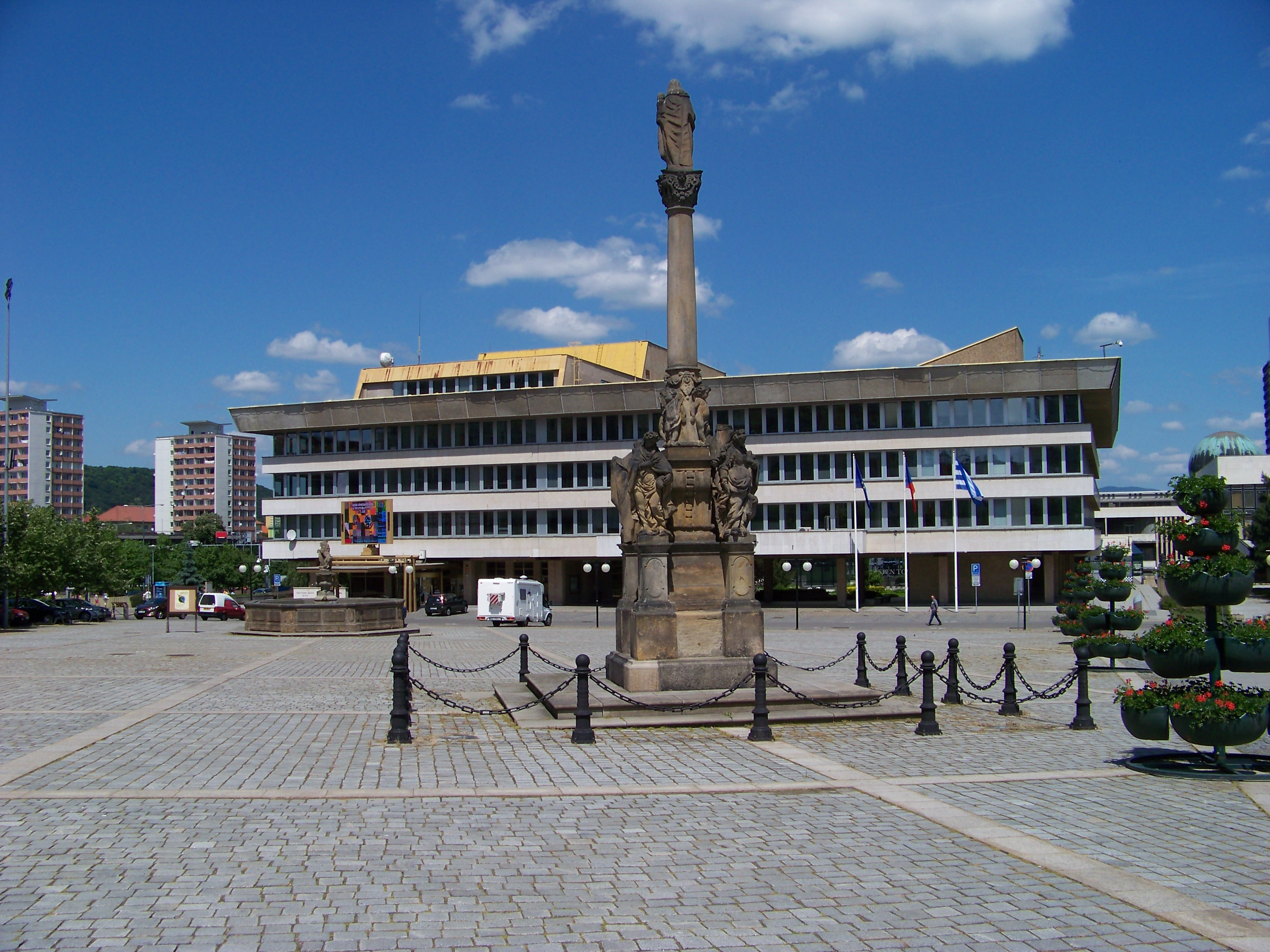
Plague column and city hall

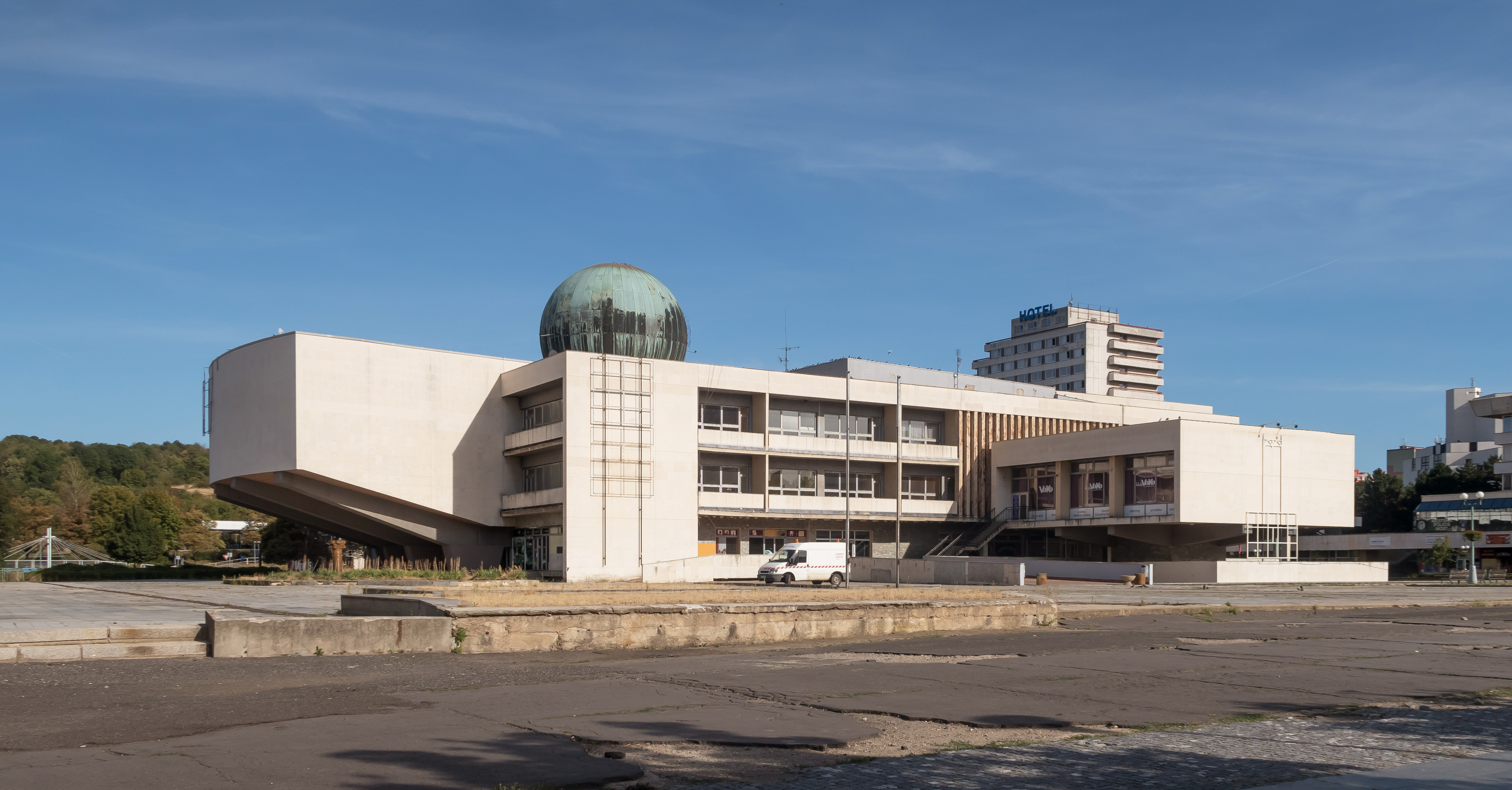
Most planetarium

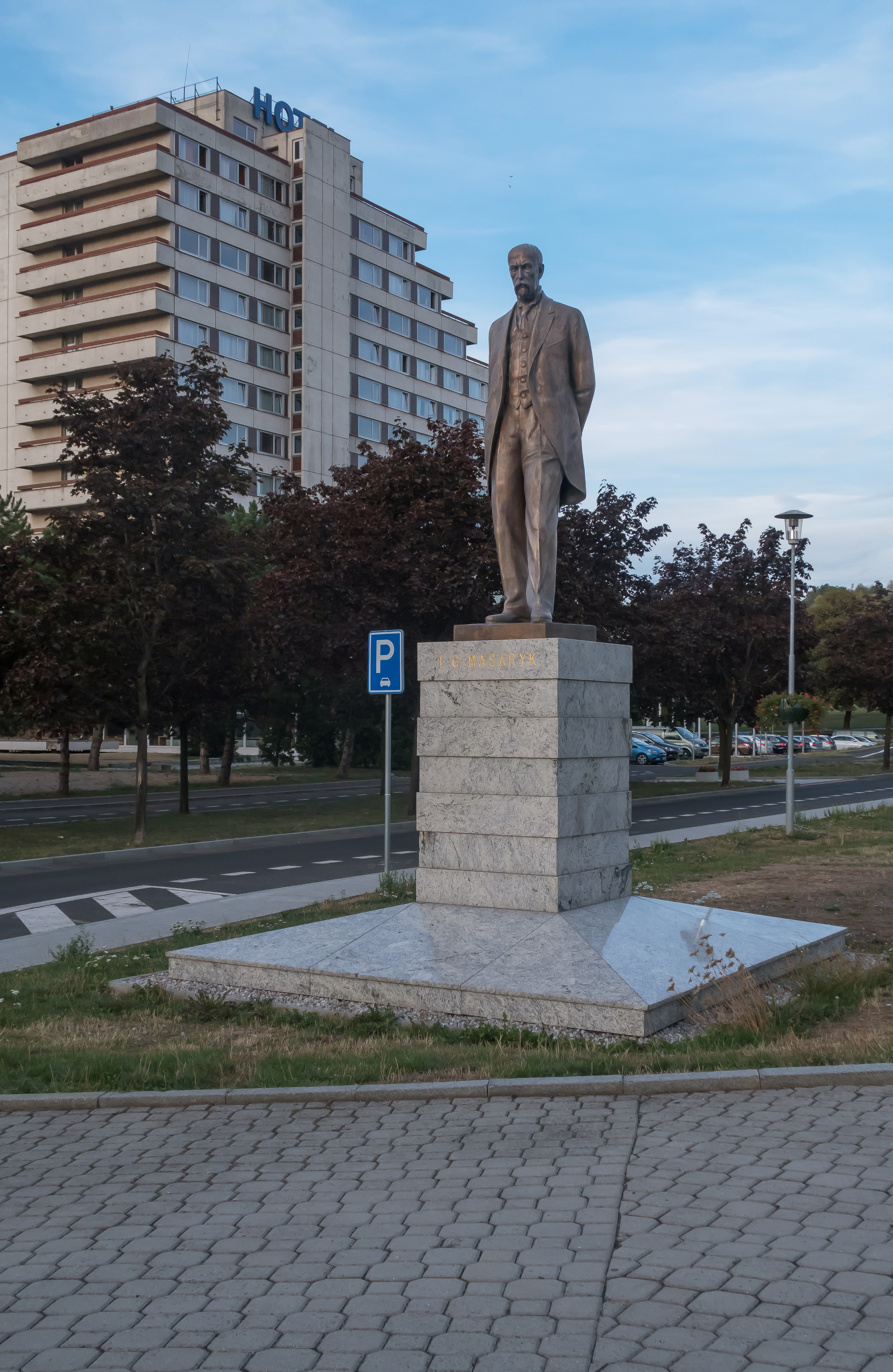
Tomáš Garrigue Masaryk statue
