= Most Lake =

Czech artificial lake

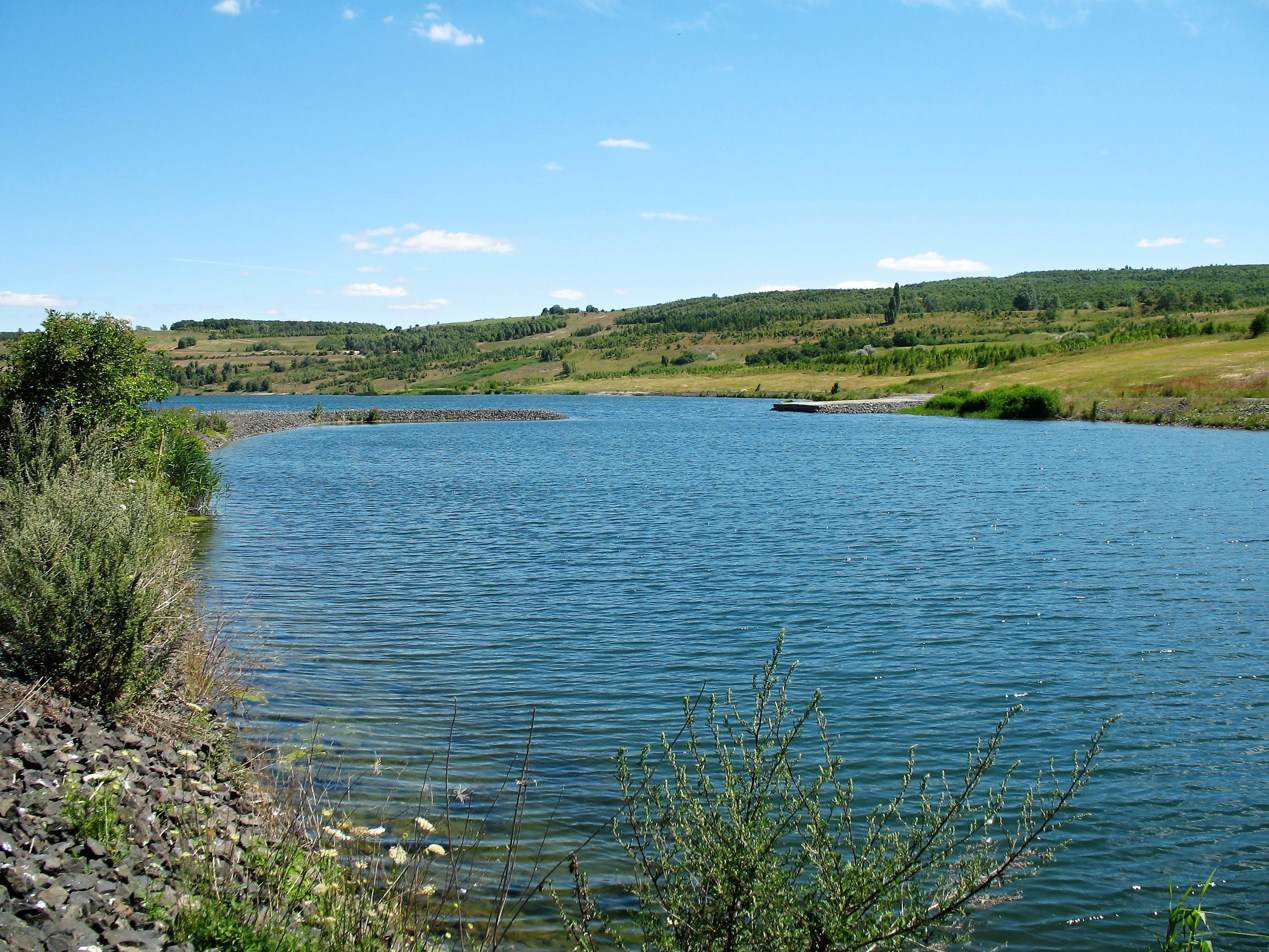
- General view

- Location within Czech Republic
- Coordinates: 50°32′13″N 13°38′40″E
- Lake type: Artificial
- Basin countries: Czech Republic
- Max. length: 3 km (1.9 mi)
- Max. width: 1.5 km (0.93 mi)
- Surface area: 3.09 km^{2} (1.19 sq mi)
- Average depth: 23 m (75 ft)
- Max. depth: 71 m (233 ft)
- Water volume: 70,500,000 m^{3} (2.49×10^{9} cu ft)
- Surface elevation: 199 m (653 ft)
- Settlements: Most

Most Lake is an artificial lake in Most in the Ústí nad Labem Region of the Czech Republic. The lake came to be as a result of land rehabilitation of an area formerly used as a lignite mine, and was named after the mine. The lake spans 309 ha (760 acres), which makes it the second largest lake in the country. It has a length of 3 km (1.9 mi) and a width of 1.5 km (0.9 mi). The water level is 199 m (653 ft) above sea level and maximum depth of the lake is 71 m (233 ft). The lake is open to the public since 12 September 2020.

== Location ==
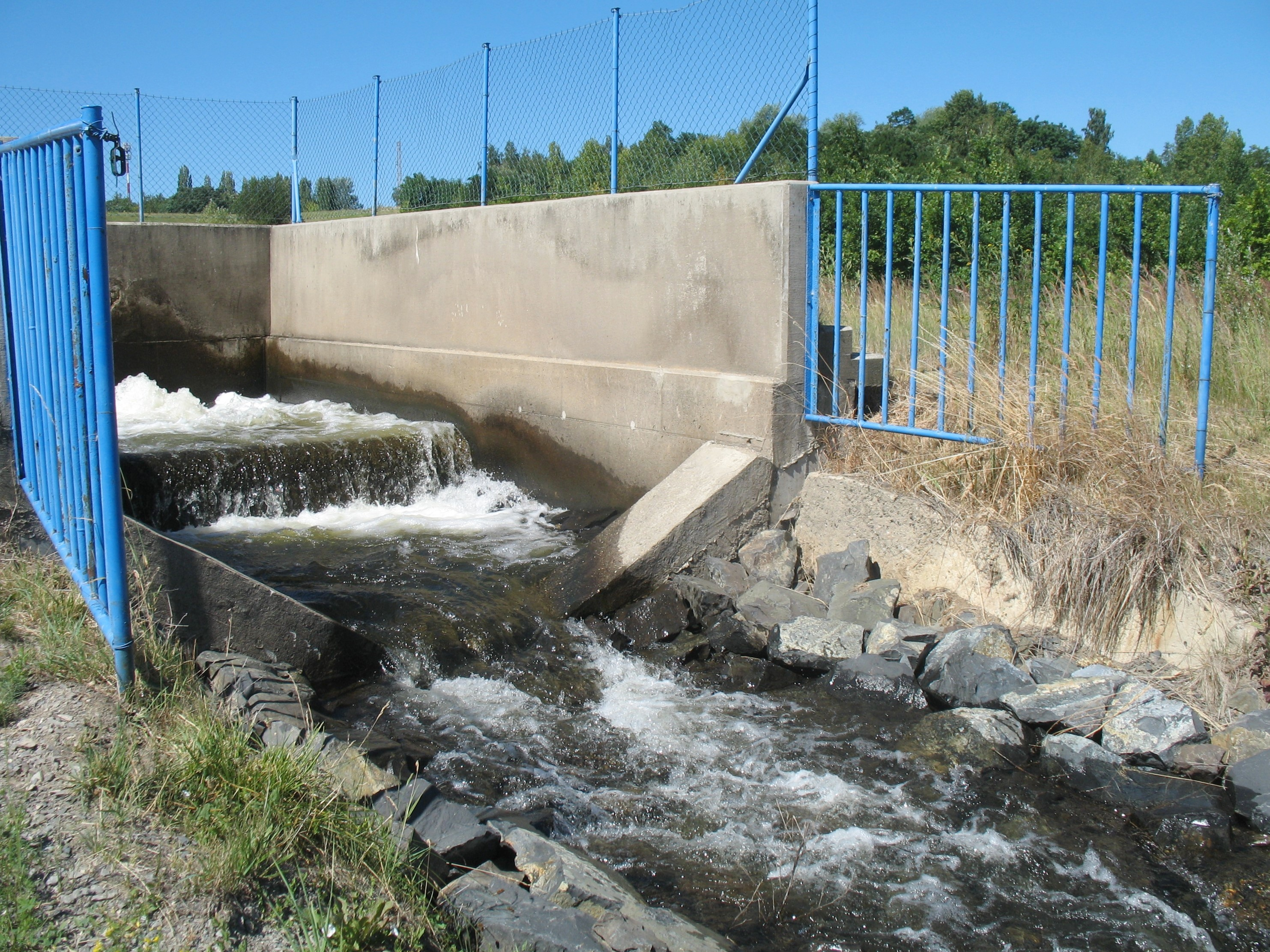
Ohře intake point

The lake is located in the Most Basin at 199 m (653 ft) above sea level. It lies in the Ústí nad Labem Region, in the northern part of the territory of the city of Most. The lake is located in the area of the former historic town of Most, which was demolished in the 1970s to make room for the Ležáky lignite mine.

== Characteristics ==
The area of the surface is 309.1 ha (764 acres), which makes is the second largest artificial lake in the country after Medard Lake. The circumference of the lake is over 8.6 kilometres (5.3 mi). The average depth of the lake is 23 m (75 ft) and the maximum depth is 71 m (233 ft). The length of the lake is 3 km (1.9 mi) and the width is 1.5 km (0.9 mi). The water level is at 199 m (653 ft) above sea level.

== History ==
The lake was created in place of the former lignite Ležáky Mine, later called Most Mine, which was in operation between the 1970s up until 31 August 1999. The area affected by the mining activity was revitalized by the state company Palivový kombinát Ústí. The lake was named after the Most Mine. The lake's name was officially selected on 24 September 2020 by the city councilors.

The Cheminvest company built a levee and a wharf at the lake. The wharf's capacity is up to several tenths of ships. The reclamation work was originally to be finished in 2018, however at the start of 2019 an announcement was made that the lake won't be accessible for recreational purposes for another year due to the lake's geological instabilities in the bedrock. In addition to that there were also delays in regards to the construction of the floating piers and other components which were to be the basis of the integrated emergency system. The lake was officially opened to the public on 12 September 2020, albeit without celebrations due to the COVID-19 crisis, because of which the Most festivities were also cancelled.

== Water level regime ==
=== Water intake of the lake ===
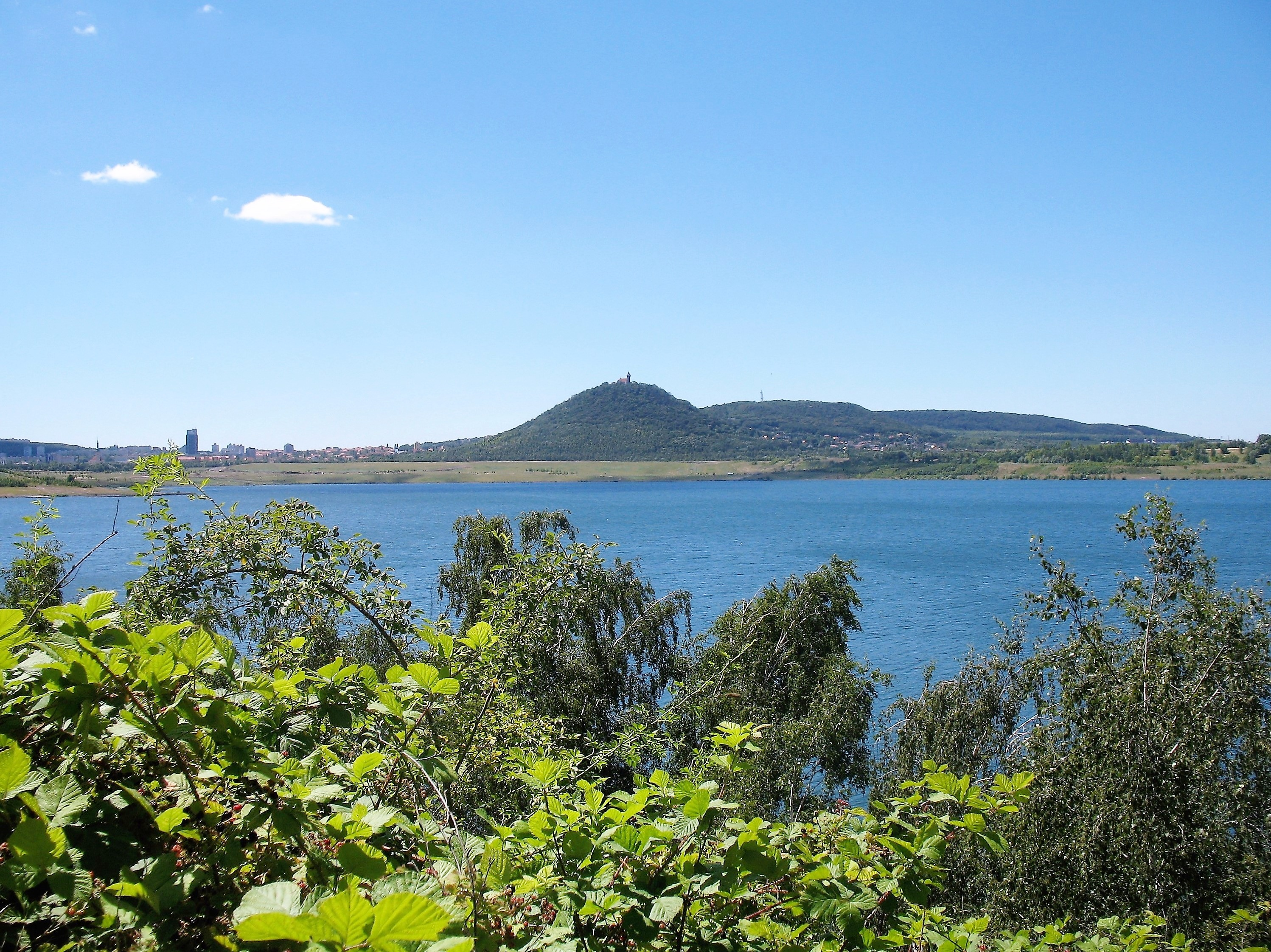
View from the lake at the Most city and the hills Hněvín and Široký vrch

The original intent from 2002 relied on setting up the Bílina River as the water source, however after further inspection by the regional sanitation station the river was deemed unfit due to a high degree of water pollution. A better water source was selected in the form of the Ohře River, which would be drawn from the Nechranice Reservoir and from the fixed weir Stranná located by the village of the same name (Stranná). Another source of water was also the approximately 5 kilometres distant Kohinoor Mine.

Filling up of the lake was officially commenced on 24 October 2008. The filling lasted until September 2014 and was interrupted twice (in 2012 and 2013).

=== Water-level maintenance ===
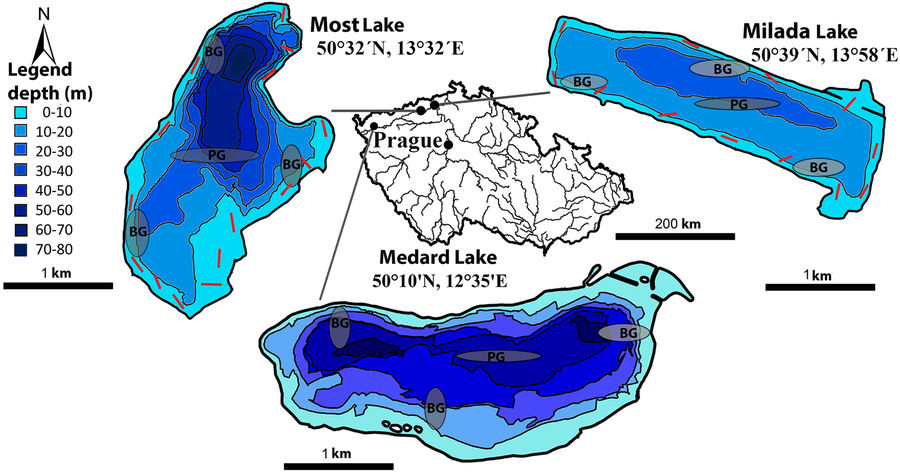
Map of the north Bohemian reclamation lakes with their individual depths noted down

The year 2016 was warmer than expected and as such the lake didn't intake enough water naturally, thus it was filled up again from the Ohře river, which turned out expensive. The original water level fluctuation of ±60 cm was first lowered to ±5 cm, then removed entirely to prevent drying of the banks and then the subsequent need to resoak them during a filling-up. There was a water treatment plant planned for construction, and it was meant to treat the incoming water from the Kohinoor underground mine. The lake costs 20 million CZK annually, and up to half of this amount can be expenses on securing the water intake from the Ohře.

== Fauna ==
=== Fish ===
A total of eight species of fish are found in the lake. Among the most numerous species introduced into the lake is maraene. Other species are European perch, tench, wels catfish, northern pike, common roach, common rudd and ruffe.

=== Molluscs ===
Six species of aquatic molluscs were found in the lake in 2013, of which five species of freshwater snails and one species of bivalve mollusc.

=== Water birds ===
Most Lake is one of the most important bird wintering grounds in the Czech Republic. According to one Most ornithology club bird census which took place in January 2019, the number of water birds present was again higher than in 2018. The experts counted a total of 6,042 birds across 22 species. The dominant among these species were black-headed gull (1,700 specimen) and the eurasian coot (1,800 specimen). Then there were also frequent common gull, caspian gull, european herring gull, yellow-legged gull, common pochard and tufted duck. There were also sightings of swans, ducks, herons and cormorants. Among rare sightings were common goldeneye, red-crested pochard, common merganser, smew, black-throated loon, red-necked grebe, black-necked grebe, common reed bunting, meadow pipit and velvet scoter.

== Gallery ==
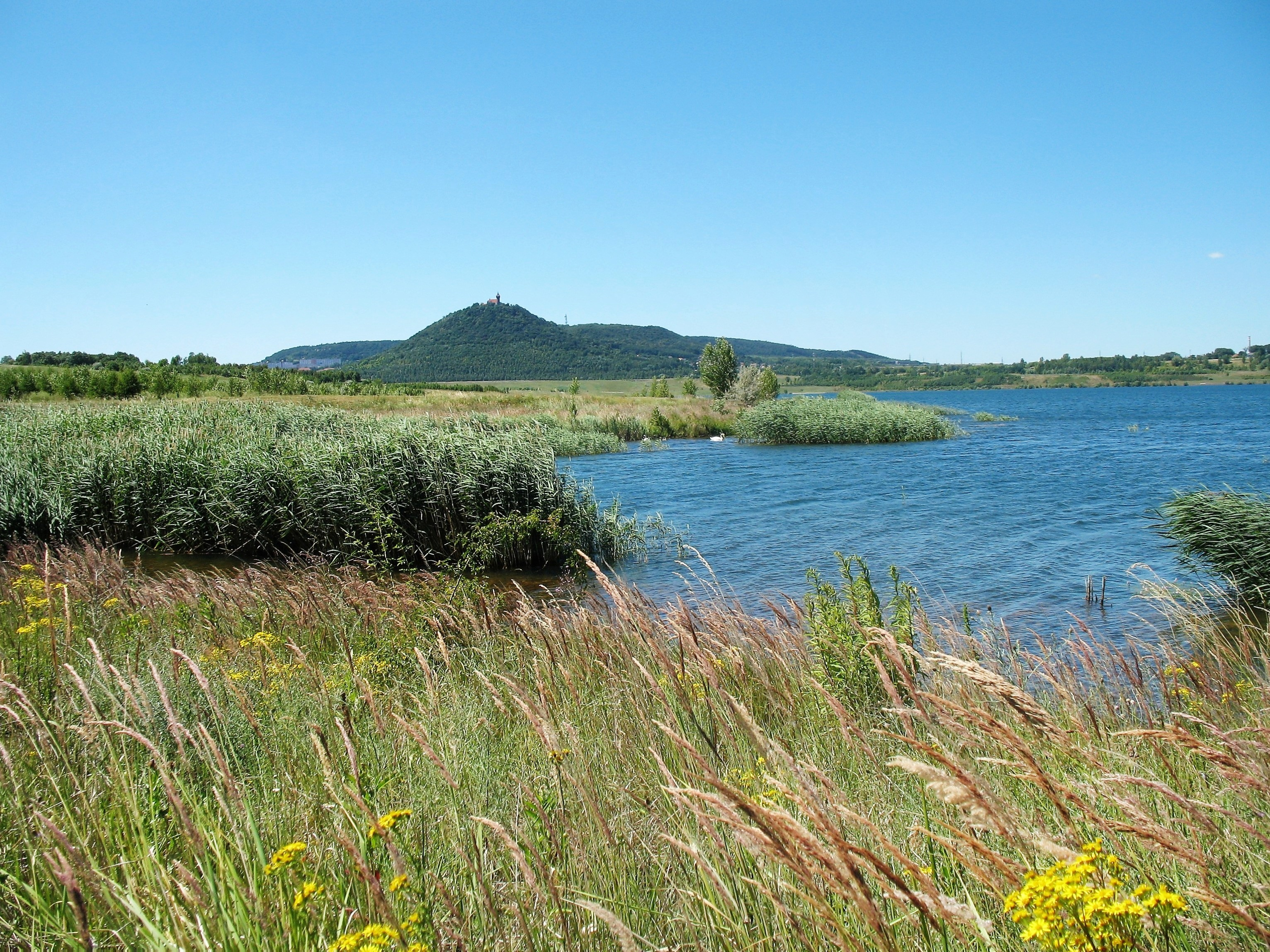
View towards Hněvín

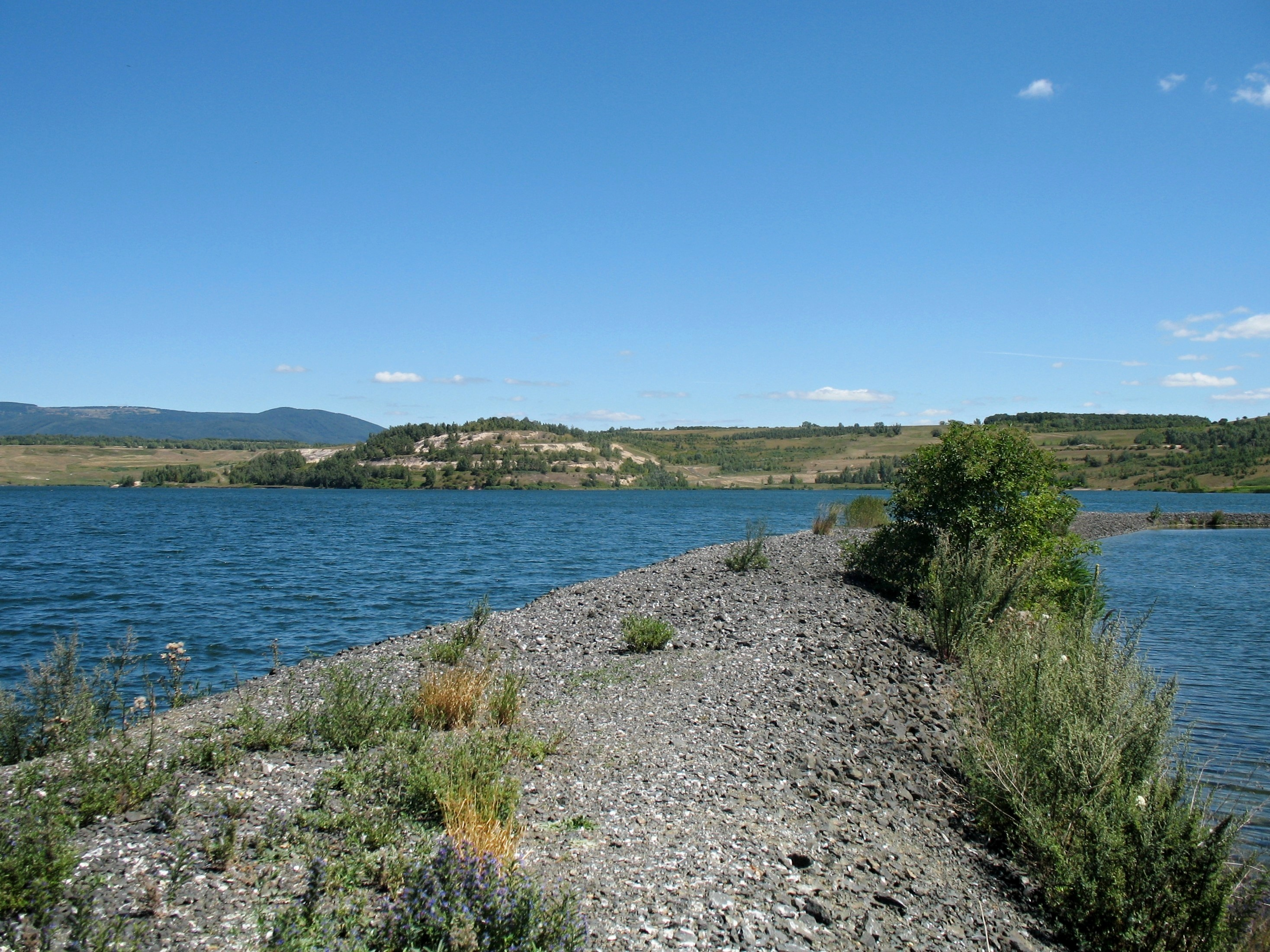
Weir in the lake

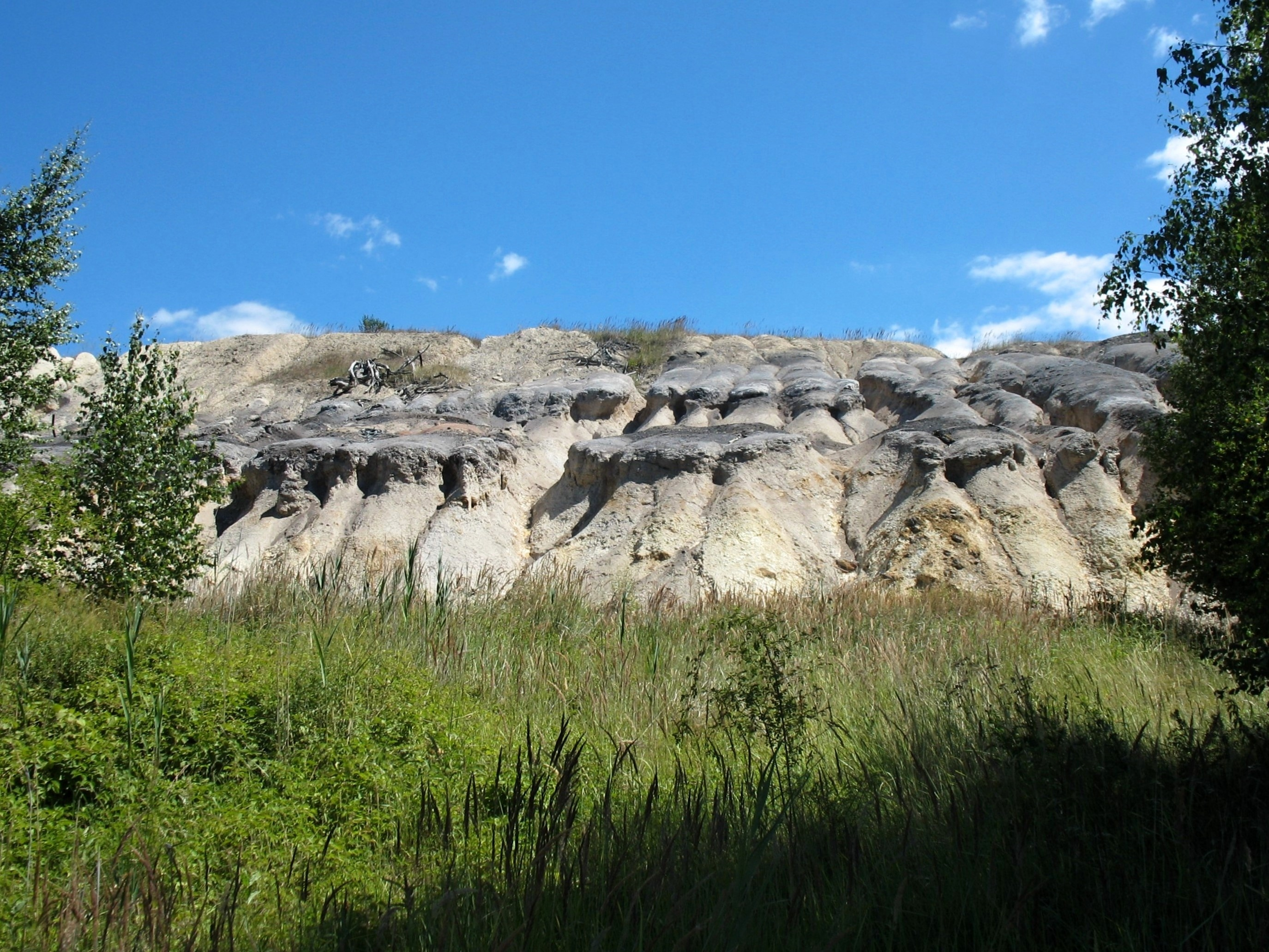
Landmass created by erosion of mine's borders

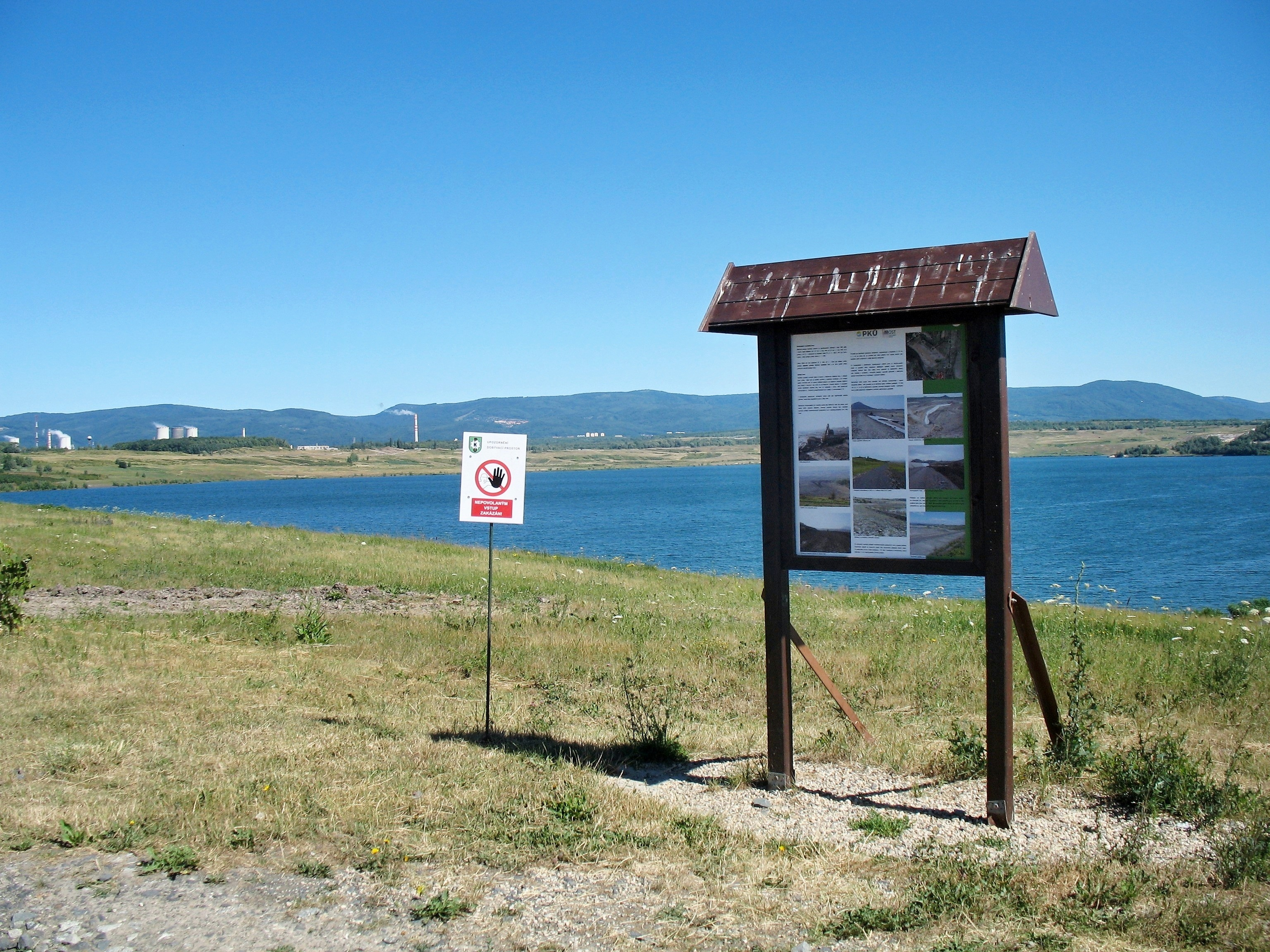
Educational trail "Napouštění jezera Most"

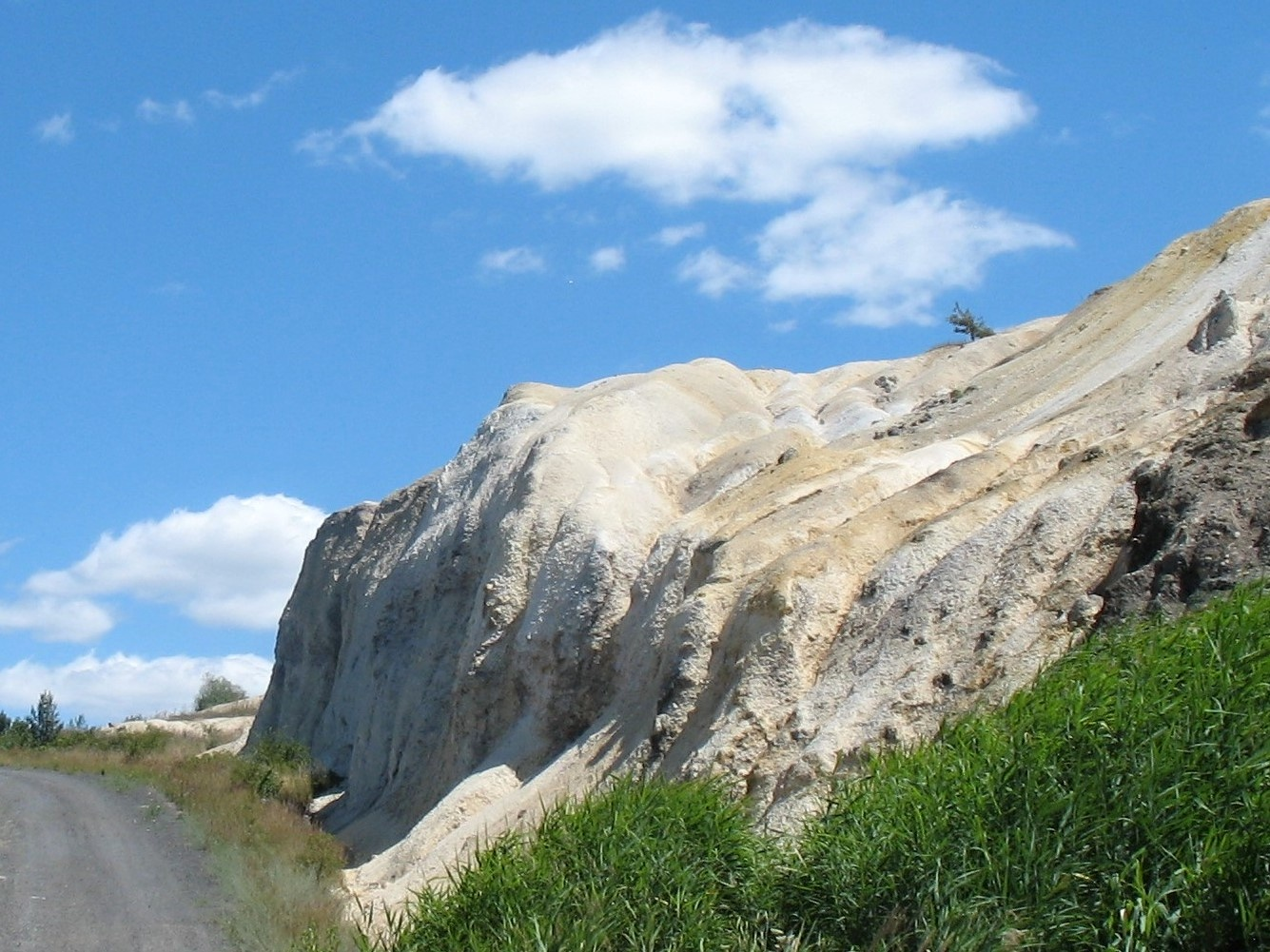
Former Ležáky lignite mine
