= Hněvín Castle =

Castle in Most, Czech Republic

Coordinates: 50°31′13″N 13°38′1″E

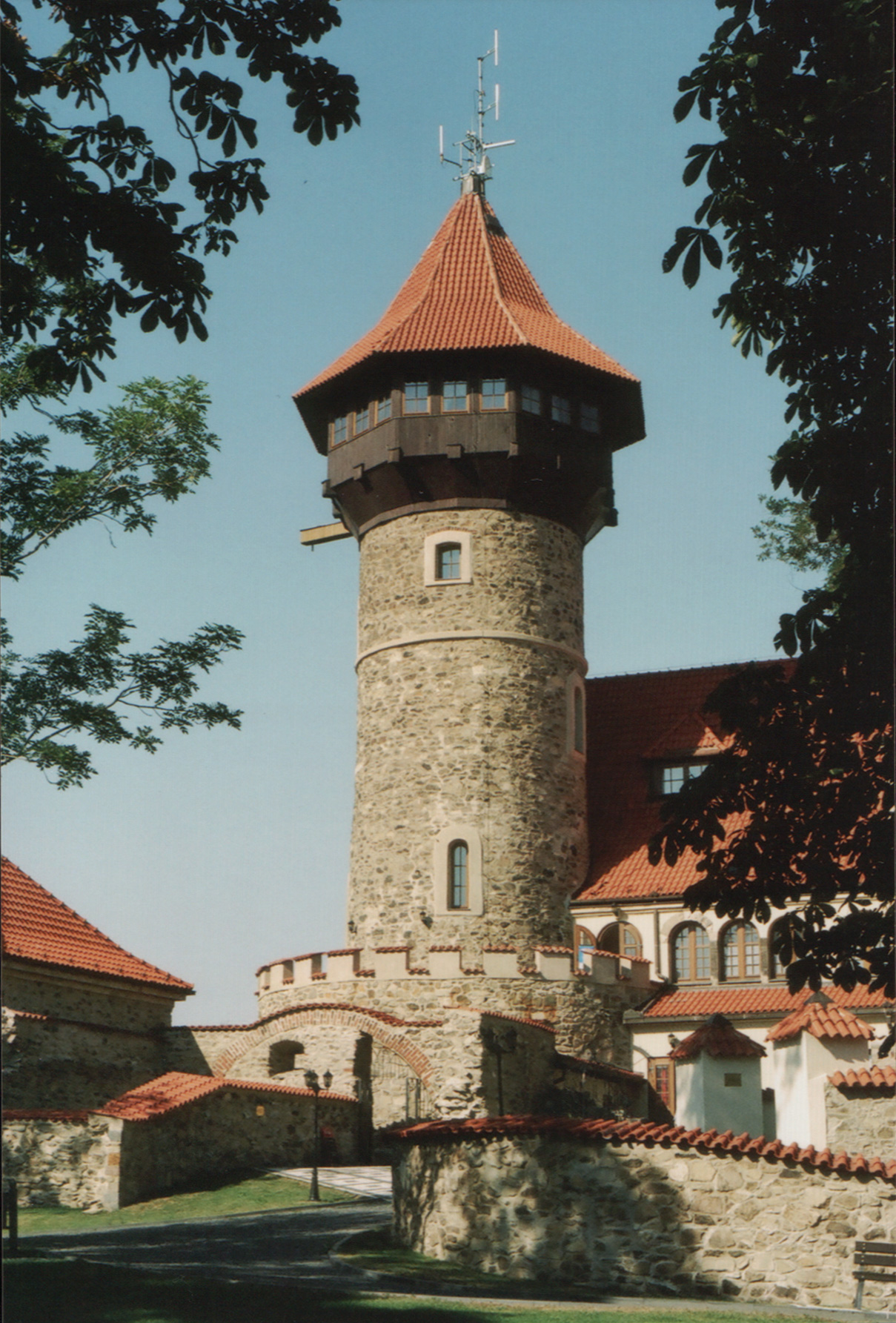
Lookout tower

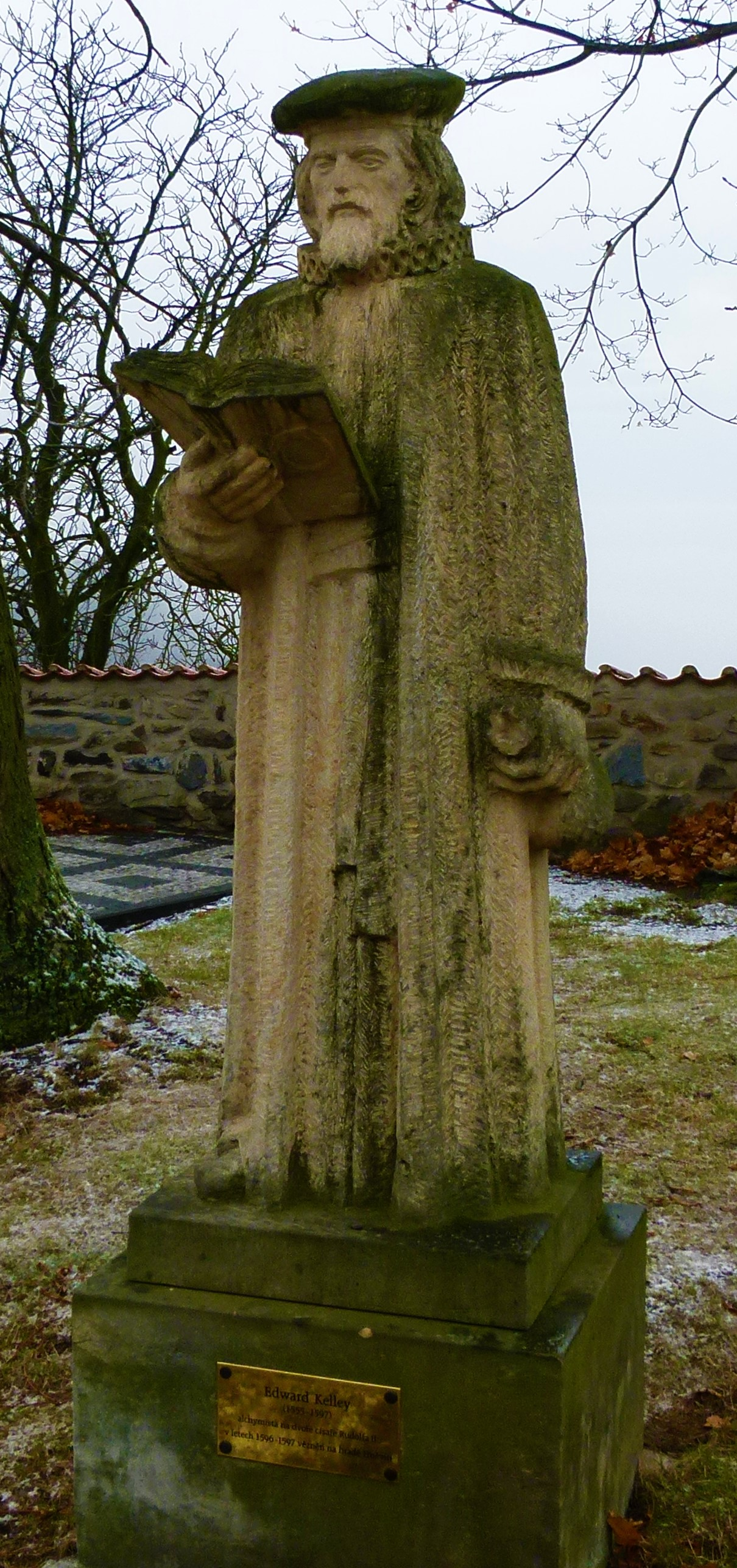
Statue of Edward Kelley

Hněvín (German: Landeswarte) is a castle in Most in the Ústí nad Labem Region of the Czech Republic.

== History ==
Hněvín Castle was named after the hill it was built upon. Archaeological investigations have uncovered the remains of a castle that was there in the 9th century, but a stone castle was probably built by the Hrabišics, the owners of Most, while Wenceslaus I granted Most royal city status in the 12th century, with the castle becoming the seat of the district administrator.

In the 13th century, the castle was brought by Wenceslaus II to the Brandenburgs, in the time of disputes of Wenceslaus IV with aristocracy, the castle came to the Meissens. Only in 1406, Wenceslaus gained the castle back. In 1459, the castle was given into the hands of George of Poděbrady on the basis of the Cheb peace contract. The son of George of Poděbrady Jindřich sold the castle in 1480 to Beneš of Veitmile and in 1482 the famous meeting of Saxony princess with king Vladislaus II took place in Most. Here it came to settlement of relation Czechs and Saxony people from many years.

During the reign of Rudolf II on his order it was on Most castle Hněvín the alchemists Edward Kelley and Marek Mamugny. Rudolf ordered to city people to care about them well at the claims of both adventurers caused to city much expense. In 1595 Rudolf II sold the castle to city Most.

From rather quiet holding of castle and its remains the Most people enjoyed up to the Thirty Years' War. In 1646 Swedes obtained it by guile and gave to Most people great penalties and charges. For one and a half years, the emperor's army besieged the castle but it remained in the Swedes hands. They also held it after concluding the Westphalian peace. The blame for its unfortunate the Most people gave to the castle which always attracted by its significance the enemies.

Emperor Ferdinand II for that reason permitted pulling down the castle, destruction beginning in 1651. The castle mountain desolated, at the foot there were vineyards and gardens. In year 1879 it was stopped the restaurant, in 1889 the tower with outlook which was later destroyed by a great wind. In 1896, it was stated the group of friends of Castle mountain and it was begun with the construction of city with outlook. It was finished in September 1900.

== Lookout tower ==
The lookout tower of the rebuilt Hněvín offers views over the former and current mining areas, the Church of the Assumption of the Virgin Mary, as well as over the new town.
