= Rudolice =

Village in Most, Czech Republic

- Municipal part of Most
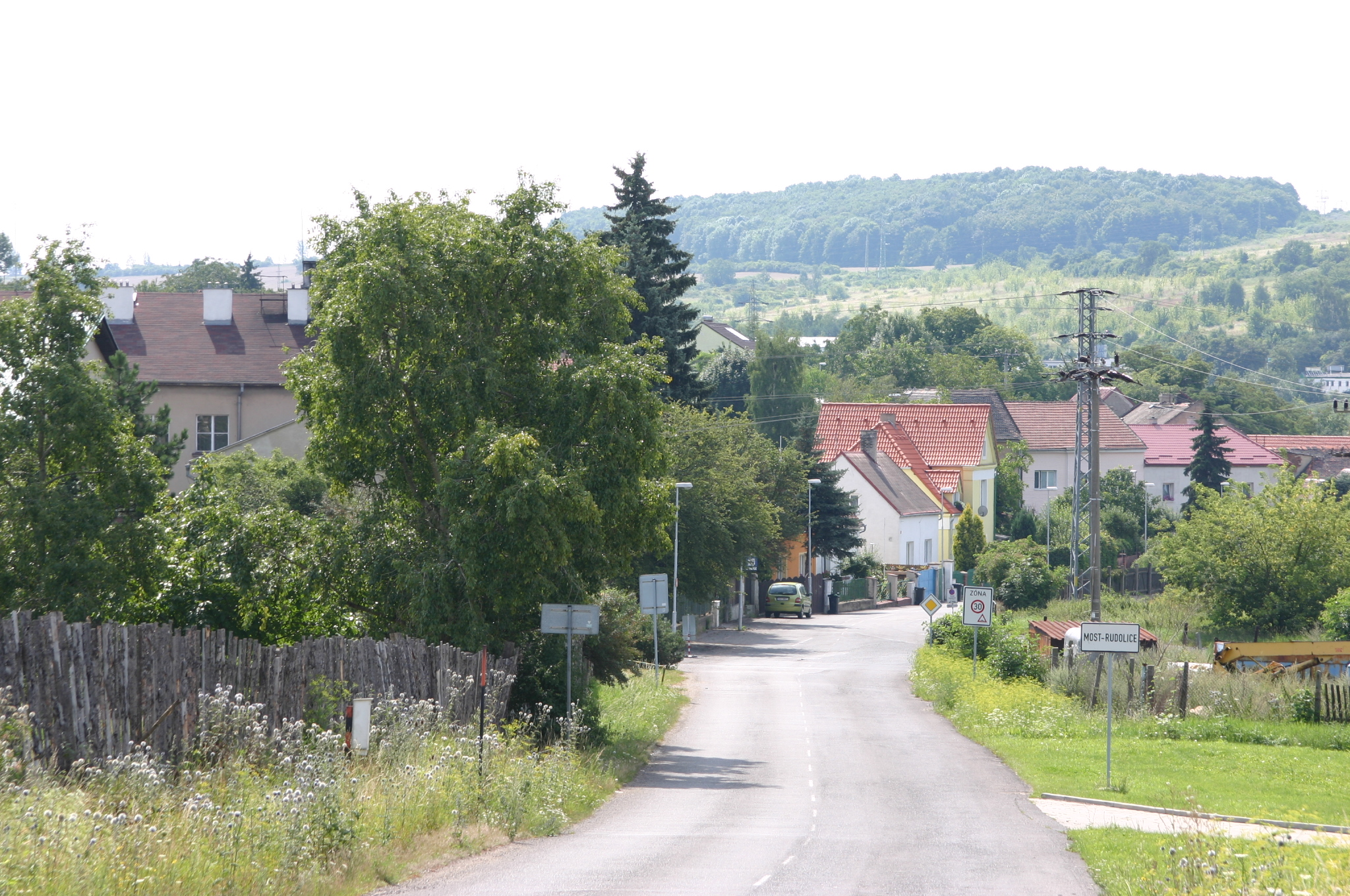
- View of Rudolice from the north
- Interactive map of Rudolice
- Coordinates: 50°30′41″N 13°39′52″E
- Country: Czech Republic
- Region: Ústí nad Labem
- District: Most
- Municipality: Most
- First mentioned: 1298

Area
  - Total: 2.19 km^{2} (0.85 sq mi)

Population (2021)
  - Total: 234
  - Density: 107/km^{2} (277/sq mi)
- Time zone: UTC+1 (CET)
  - Summer (DST): UTC+2 (CEST)
- Postal code: 434 01

Rudolice (German: Rudelsdorf) is a village and municipal part of the city of Most, Czech Republic. As of 2021, it had 234 inhabitants.

== History ==
The area has been inhabited since the Neolithic age. The first written mention of Rudolice (as Rudolfsdorf) comes from 1298. Between 1298 and 1349, Osek Monastery bought out the estate and kept it until 1848.

Until the end of the 18th century, Rudolice was a tiny hamlet; later, the number of inhabitants started to grow, peaking in the period of 1921 (389 inhabitants) – 1930 (1,279 inhabitants). In 1947, the village became part of the city of Most. Much of the housing was torn down during the second half of the 1960s to make way for mining and transportation infrastructure.

== Demographics ==
Historical population

Year	Pop.	±%
1869	132	—
1880	283	+114.4%
1890	245	−13.4%
1900	299	+22.0%
1910	318	+6.4%
1921	389	+22.3%
1930	1,279	+228.8%
1950	826	−35.4%

Year	Pop.	±%
1961	839	+1.6%
1970	304	−63.8%
1980	217	−28.6%
1991	150	−30.9%
2001	158	+5.3%
2011	206	+30.4%
2021	234	+13.6%

Source: Censuses
