= Sedlec (Litoměřice District) =

- Municipality
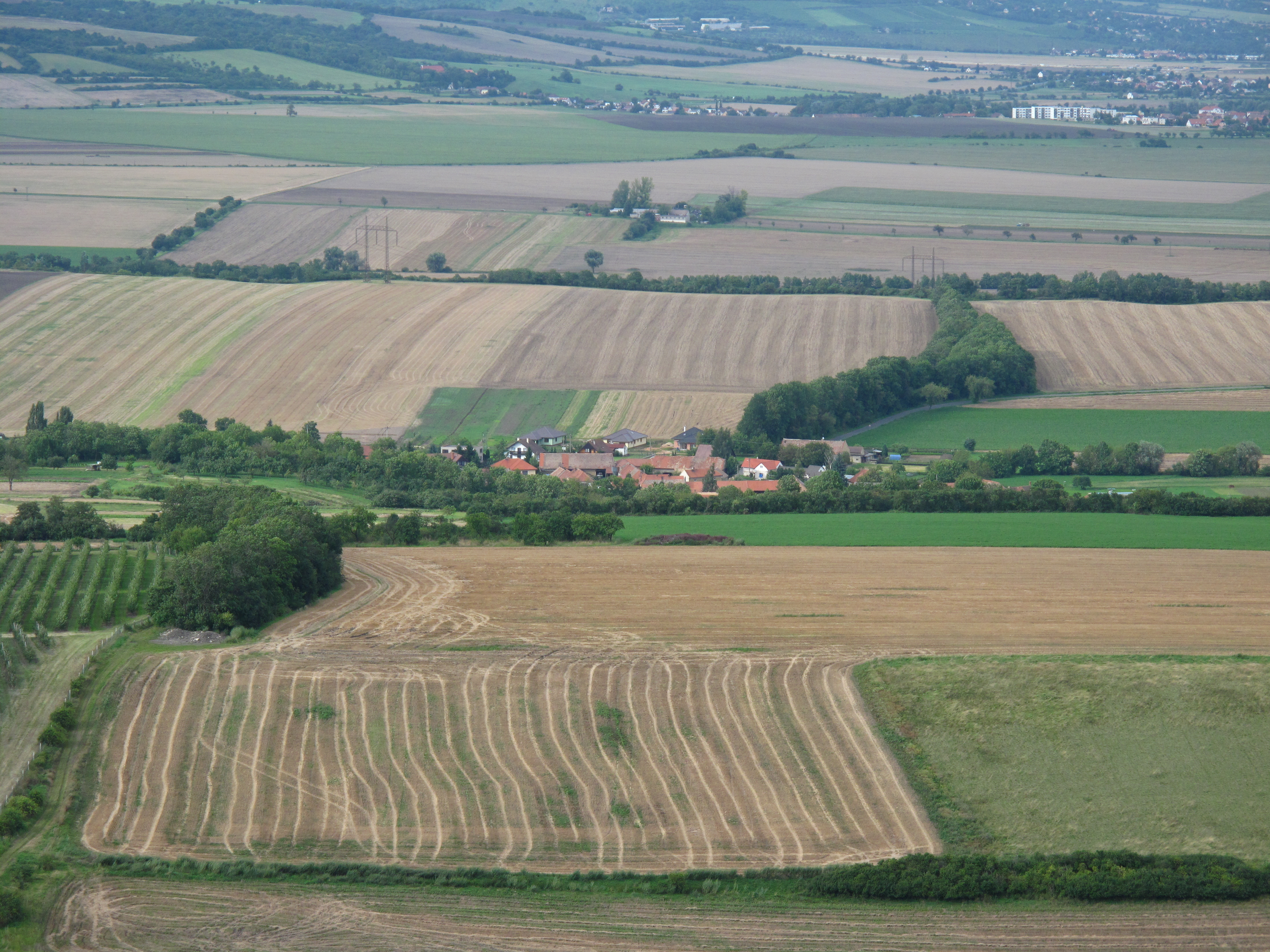
- View from the south

- Location in the Czech Republic
- Coordinates: 50°27′0″N 14°0′59″E
- Country: Czech Republic
- Region: Ústí nad Labem
- District: Litoměřice
- First mentioned: 1057

Area
  - Total: 3.99 km^{2} (1.54 sq mi)
- Elevation: 198 m (650 ft)

Population (2026-01-01)
  - Total: 206
  - Density: 51.6/km^{2} (134/sq mi)
- Time zone: UTC+1 (CET)
  - Summer (DST): UTC+2 (CEST)
- Postal code: 411 15
- Website: www.sedlec-obec.cz

Sedlec is a municipality and village in Litoměřice District in the Ústí nad Labem Region of the Czech Republic. It has about 200 inhabitants.

Sedlec lies approximately 12 kilometres (7 mi) south-west of Litoměřice, 24 km (15 mi) south of Ústí nad Labem, and 50 km (31 mi) north-west of Prague.

== Demographics ==
Historical population
Year	Pop.	±%
1869	299	—
1880	287	−4.0%
1890	298	+3.8%
1900	327	+9.7%
1910	332	+1.5%
1921	303	−8.7%
1930	313	+3.3%
1950	259	−17.3%
1961	225	−13.1%
1970	205	−8.9%
1980	178	−13.2%
1991	163	−8.4%
2001	176	+8.0%
2011	198	+12.5%
2021	213	+7.6%
Source: Censuses
