= Brown coal mining limits in North Bohemia =

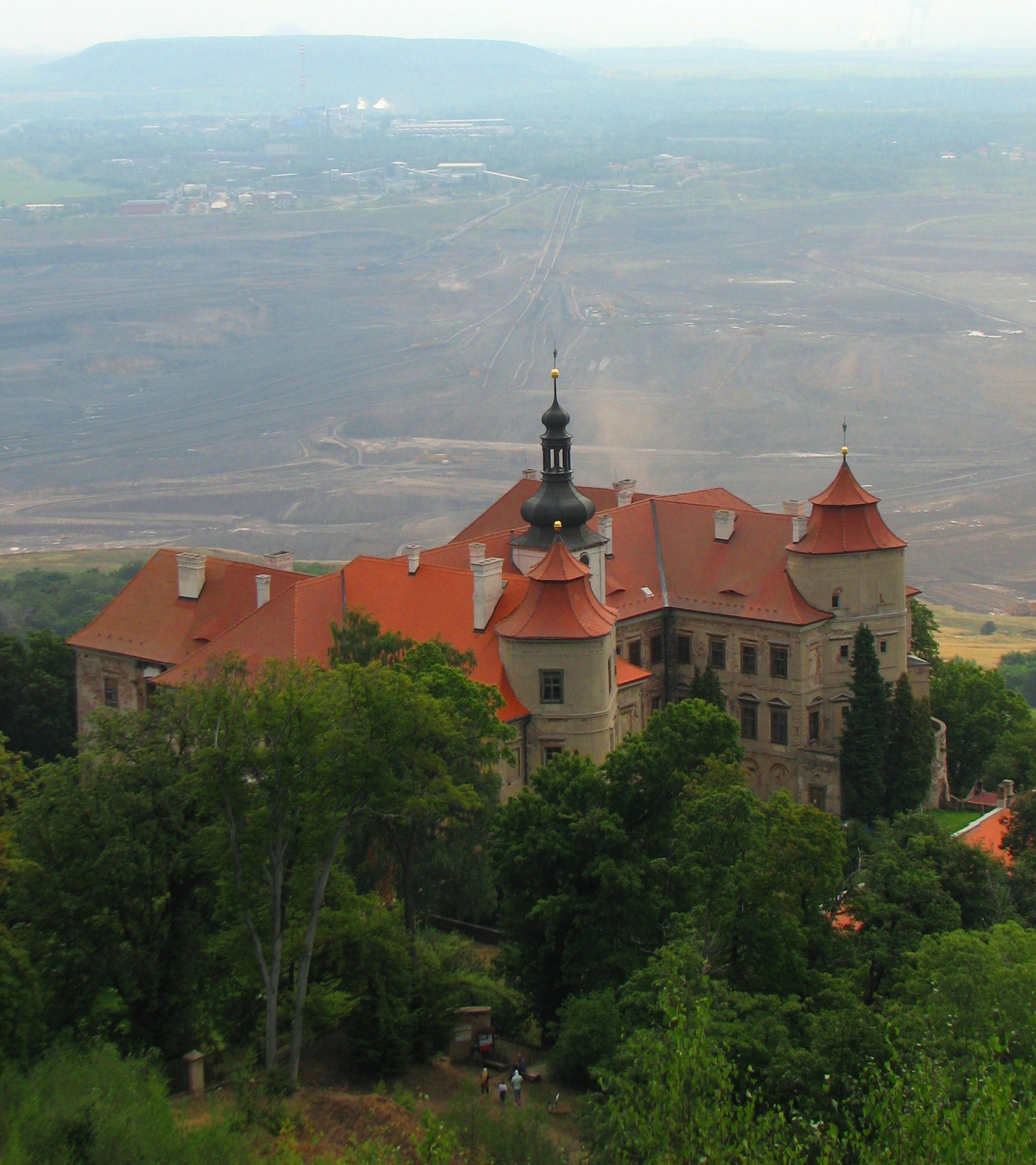
Jezeří Chateau above the Czechoslovak Army Mine in Mostecko

Territorial limits to the mining of brown coal in North Bohemia are legally binding according to Resolution No. 444 passed in 1991 by the government of the Czech Republic, on the basis of a proposal tabled by the then Minister for the Environment, Ivan Dejmal. The limits define the areas that can be mined for lignite, as well as areas where coal reserves have been written off. There is now the prospect, however, that the limits will be breached and sanction given to increase coal mining further, which would involve the demolition of more communities within the currently demarcated limits, e.g. Horní Jiřetín and Černice.

- The limits concern these mining localities: Czechoslovak Army Mine, Jan Šverma Mine, Vršany Mine, Bílina Mine and Nástup - Tušimice Mine.

This article focuses almost exclusively on the limits as they apply to mines in the Mostecko region roughly between the city of Most and the town of Litvínov operated by Czech Coal.

== The reason for the setting of mining limits ==
During the course of the 20th century, the Most Basin, an area of over 1100 km2, was heavily mined from Kadaň to Ústí nad Labem for brown coal for burning in a large number of thermal power stations, electrical power stations and factories. In the 1970s and 1980s, the mining increased on a massive scale, and because of the expansion of mining operations whole villages, towns and even cities (Most) were demolished to extract the coal that lay beneath; (Note: A total of 106 towns were destroyed as a result of mining, including the 650-year-old former royal city of Most) their inhabitants were rehoused in large-scale new prefabricated panelled apartment buildings.

The low quality technology used for large-scale burning of brown coal led to a sharp increase in the content of harmful sulfur dioxide and aerosols in the atmosphere. The result was wholesale damage to the environment (such as the die-back of the forests in the Ore Mountains from acid rain) and human health. In view of the unsustainable situation, the first post-communist Czechoslovak government decided to resolve the situation by introducing desulphurization and aerosol removal from major state-owned power plants, and the setting of limits which specific mines should not go beyond in future. In areas that had already been mined, support was also given to the reclamation of damaged landscape. The limits hence served as a government guarantee to North Bohemian communities that their environment would no longer continue to deteriorate and that their very existence has a long-term future, i.e. that it is worth purchasing property there, building and renovating houses, reconstructing roads and utilities, establishing businesses, etc.

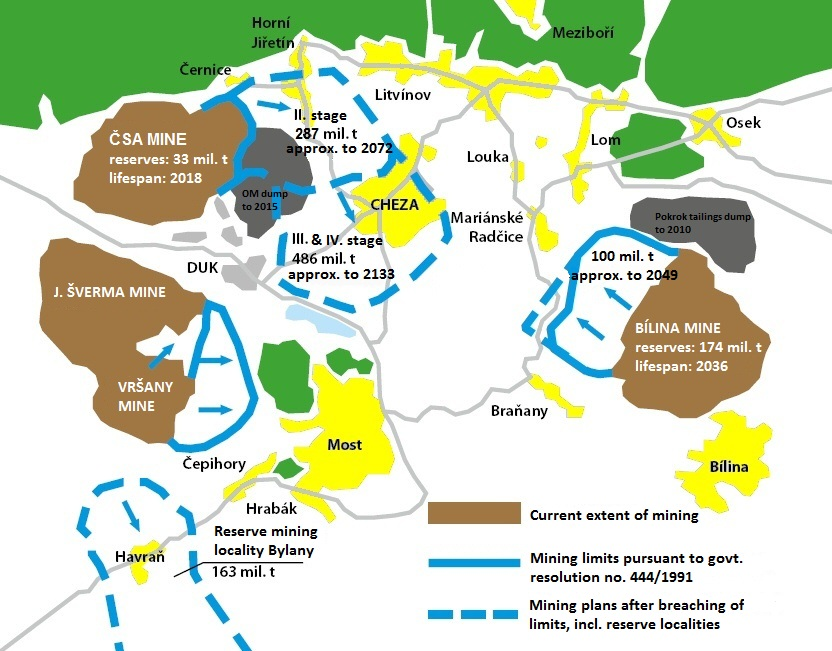
Territorial mining limits in North Bohemia as they affect the mines of Czech Coal and plans for further extraction of brown coal beyond the limits. Source: Kořeny (2012) and Invicta Bohemica (2010, in VŠE 2011)

== Support for breaching the mining limits ==
The viability of these limits has long had doubt cast on them by the mining companies directly affected by the limits, Severočeské doly and the Czech Coal Group, and the electric power company ČEZ. While the official stance of Czech Prime Minister Petr Nečas and all political parties represented in the Czech parliament as of 2012 (apart from the Communist Party of Bohemia and Moravia (Note: Communist Party member of parliament, Karel Šidlo, stated “The Communist Party decided to support the breaching of the brown coal mining limits as a necessary condition for ensuring the long-term energy security and independence of the Czech Republic, which is a basis for the further development of the Czech economy. Further reasons are the maintenance of job opportunities and reducing the unemployment rate in a region which has been for a long time one of the highest in the Czech Republic.”)) was in favour of maintaining the North Bohemian mining limits, the miners have or have had the support of at least some individual national members of parliament. These include prominent members of the main government coalition partner, the Civic Democratic Party, such as deputy party leader and Trade and Industry Minister Martin Kuba (Note: Kuba pushed for the maintenance of the state’s right to expropriate private property as part of negotiations over a draft amendment to the Mining Act in case a decision is made in future to breach the current mining limits. "Kuba wants to keep the option of expropriation because of coal mining." Deník, 28.2.2012. A group of environmental NGOs has also accused Kuba and his Ministry of continuing to push for increased mining beyond the limits by promoting a raw materials policy that is completely at odds with the draft State Energy Strategy 2012 which is based on maintenance of the current limits. See "Kuba’s draft energy plan doesn’t count on mining beyond the coal limits, otherwise it’s worth nothing". Greenpeace press release, 7 November 2012.) and Jan Bureš. (Note: Bureš is a member of the parliamentary subcommittee on energy who stated “Personally, I believe that breaching the limits is desirable, and the state, as the coal owner, should set conditions so that mining beyond today’s limits guarantees a supply of coal for an economically acceptable price for Czech heating plants”.)

At the regional level, however, Social Democracy (SD) politicians in the Ústí nad Labem Region in which the mining limits apply have broken ranks with their national organisation by supporting a breach of the limits. (Note: The former deputy governor of the Ústí nad Labem Region for the SD, Pavel Kouda, is a well-known supporter of extended mining in the region, as is the SD district organisation in the city of Most. Kouda sent a letter on governor letterhead to the Ministry of Trade and Industry in late 2011 stating express support for the breaching of mining limits after 2014. "Ústí nad Labem Region supports breaching of coal mining limits". ČeskáPozice.cz, 28 December 2011.) Following regional elections in 2012, the Communists emerged as the largest regional party in the Ústí nad Labem Region. The Communist Party won 25.26% of the popular vote in the region, which was over 9% more than its closest rival, the Czech Social Democratic Party (16.13%). Its regional leader, Oldřich Bubeníček, restated the need from his party's perspective to breach the limits to maintain regional employment, albeit "only if the miners agree with the local inhabitants and there is proper compensation". Negotiations between the Communist Party, the Czech Social Democratic Party and Severočeši.cz on forming a coalition regional government indicated that there was general agreement on breaching the mining limits. After successfully negotiating a coalition government and becoming the first communist hejtman (governor) since the creation of independent regional governments following the 1989 Velvet Revolution, Bubeníček reiterated his support for repealing the limits:"The reason is the maintenance of hundreds of jobs".

Other important energy policy stakeholders are also in favour of breaching the mining limits. The head of the Energy Regulatory Office, Alena Vitásková, for example, supports mining past the current limits in order to lower energy prices for consumers. "If the coal limits are breached, heating from coal will be the cheapest for customers, that’s obvious. I’m in favour of breaching the limits – that way we’ll get an energy source cheaper than gas and renewable sources.”

The co-owner of Severní energetická (formerly Litvínovská uhelná and which is part of the Czech Coal Group), Jan Dienstl, is the most accessible of the mining operators, and has never been averse to openly calling for the repealing of the mining limits. In his opinion, it is a clear issue of maintaining power and heating supplies to the Czech population and the state must categorically state whether it wants brown coal for its citizens or not. “And if not, somebody from the government must stand up and clearly say what will replace coal. Coal heats the houses of nearly three million people and the price of heating for them will increase by a half. It’s necessary to state very specifically who employs thousands of people who won’t have work in the region. Coal supplies cheap electricity and heating and employs people while it doesn’t need and doesn’t receive any subsidies.”

"There is no doubt… that the public discussion goes totally beyond a rational core. The main argument of the mining opponents is emotion, half-truths and sometimes unfortunately lies. For example, Šťovíček and Buřt came to their positions primarily on the basis that the citizens of Horní Jiřetín will live more years in total uncertainty in the future. And if mining ceases, it will mean that the local people will still have to live at least another 30 years on the edge of a mine, but without the money that the town gets from it today. Because of the winding down [of operations at the Czechoslovak Army Mine] we will pay Horní Jiřetín less from the mining of coal. And it is worth remembering that profit from the mining forms nearly half of the Horní Jiřetín budget, so the town will have to tighten its belt a lot without coal mining."

== Opposition to dismantling the limits ==
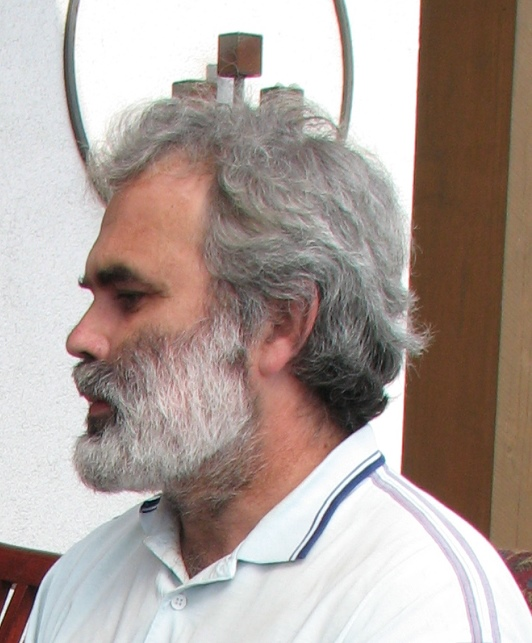
Vladimír Buřt, mayor of Horní Jiřetín

Support for maintaining the limits and opposing expanded mining operations is led by a coalition of national NGOs, local civic associations and elected municipal officials from the towns most at threat from the lifting of the limits, e.g. Horní Jiřetín and Litvínov.

The most prominent opponent to expanded mining from among local municipal politicians is Vladimír Buřt, Mayor of Horní Jiřetín, who has been a member of the local council there since 2003. Buřt won a seat on the Ústí nad Labem regional council as a member of the Green Party on the Hnutí PRO kraj ticket in the 2012 regional elections.

Buřt has stated his conviction that in relation to Horní Jiřetín, there is little coal remaining following termination of coal mining operations in the town's cadastre in the late 1980s which made extensive use of deep mining technology, and therefore Horní Jiřetín represents more of a blockage to mining further afield rather than as a site resting on large coal reserves. "A large part of Jiřetín is built on the slopes of the Ore Mountains. If the miners wanted to get the rest of the coal directly under Jiřetín, they’d not only have to mine the built-up area, but also much of the slopes of the Ore Mountains. They'd have to remove the beech forests and hillsides up to another one hundred metres above the town. That in itself is incredible barbarity, and it’s nonsense of course from an economic point of view."

Buřt is supported in his views by other equally vocal representatives of towns bordering the mining limits. These include Milan Štovíček, the Deputy Mayor of Litvínov (formerly the Mayor until the 2014 municipal elections), the Mayor of Hora Svaté Kateřiny Lukáš Pakosta, and his father, the former Mayor of Hora Svaté Kateřiny, Petr Pakosta. Lukáš Pakosta has even suggested that his town could secede from the Czech Republic and join Germany if the mining limits are lifted because of problems with accessibility to the town that would be caused by expanded mining.

Another major voice in the pro-limits camp is Martin Říha, a former Deputy Minister for the Environment from 1990 to 1992, and a well-known Czech architect and expert in Environmental Impact Assessment. He was instrumental in overturning plans to demolish the North-West Bohemian town of Duchcov in the 1980s for the sake of mining the coal deposits beneath it, and for preserving Jezeří Chateau from the danger posed by mining near its base. Together with Petr Pakosta and a number of others he was responsible for publishing a book in 2005 on the history of coal mining in North-West Bohemia and the battle to establish the limits. A newspaper interview with Severní energetická co-owner Jan Dienstl (see above), for example, provoked a rapid rebuttal from Říha: “The need for coal for the production of electricity is falling and if we didn’t export near 20% of electricity abroad, it would be even lower and there would also be enough coal within the limits for the production of heating for residential and municipal purposes. Moreover, international climate protection commitments will push us to lower the production of CO_{2} and hence to a further reduction in the amount of coal burned. And finally it should also be taken into consideration whether it's sensible to use coal as a fuel and to burn valuable future sources of hydrocarbons today with an efficiency of 35 – 42% and not leave part of the reserves in the ground for another generation and better technology. Jan Dienstl is right that as long as an environment prevails in the coal basin that is co-created by open cast mining and the energy sector, it will be difficult to entice other sectors and other technology there. That’s also why surface mining and an energy industry based on the burning of coal has to be wound down and gradually replaced with emissionless, non-exhaustible or renewable sources. It’s hypocritical to say the miners support the locals. Even after 1989 there was no change in the practice that an imperceptible fraction of what is taken from it is returned to the region. The miners’ contribution to town budgets for maintenance and repairs to monuments, and for the civic life of a community affected by the consequences of mining are in comparison to the profits of the miners shamefully low, within a fraction of a percentage. Payments to towns for the mining of occupied territory are also low, and tax payments to the state are also not returned through the state budget in a corresponding amount to the local area for reclamation of the landscape, restoration of communities, and reconstruction of transport and technical infrastructure as the region and its inhabitants would deserve.

The Czech office of Greenpeace has campaigned against the dismantling of the limits since 2005. Greenpeace has undertaken a large amount of lobbying and mobilisation work both at the national and regional level. It has also staged dozens of public awareness events – from the creation of a new outdoor living area for the people of Horní Jiřetín through to the unfolding of a huge banner with a cartoon depiction of Prime Minister Petr Nečas on one the bucket-wheel excavators in the Czechoslovak Army mine that endangers Horní Jiřetín, to repeated squatting on the roof and garden of the Office of the Czech Government during governmental sittings.

=== Local referendums ===
Another key opponent of mining beyond the limits is the civic association, Kořeny (English: Roots), formed to prevent the bulldozing of Horní Jiřetín and Černice and the threat to the development of the city of Litvínov and the surrounding villages as a result of breaching the territorial mining limits. “Neither we nor our descendants want to have to live for more than a century in a devastated landscape and poor environment just a few metres from active open mines,” the Kořeny website states.

Kořeny organised a referendum in Horní Jiřetín on 25 February 2005 which asked residents two questions:

- 1. Should the town use all legal means to protect itself from the demolition of homes and the eviction of its inhabitants?
- 2. Should the town’s representatives promote the preservation of the territorial mining limits as an effective means of protecting the town in regard to both state authorities and Ústí nad Labem regional authorities?

Seventy-five per cent of the town's voting-age population participated in the referendum, and 96% voted in favour of preserving their town and against lifting the mining limits. Two years later and “after a massive Mostecká uhelna [mining company] campaign and an intense "screening phase" to persuade residents to move,” 75% of citizens voted in municipal elections to promote the preservation of the town. On this basis, municipality representatives passed a resolution that they would not negotiate with the mining company over the demolition of the town and would take substantive steps not only to ensure its preservation, but primarily its development as well.

Kořeny organised a similar referendum on 1 December 2006 in the city of Litvínov, which in the event of the liquidation of Upper Jiřetín and Černice would be faced with mining up to 500 metres from the city limits and influence the life of the city for the next 100 years. Ninety-five per cent of those who cast votes voted in favour of preventing the mining. More people participated in the referendum than in the municipal elections (38%), although the referendum was announced only five weeks later. The result of the referendum is not legally binding, but the City Council is committed to promoting its outcome. To achieve this, city councilors took several basic steps: they called on the government to write off the coal reserves beyond the mining limits, and they called on mining companies Mostecká uhelná and Severočeské doly to respect the government resolution and abandon plans to continue mining towards the city.

The referendum question asked the following:

Should the city of Litvinov actively use all means available to prevent surface mining close to Litvinov which would exceed the environmental limits specified by Government Resolution No. 444/1991?

The results were as follows: 38.23% participation (8285 residents); yes 95.46% (7909); no 3.47% (288); abstained 1.07% (24).

== Parliament removes expropriation clause from Mining Act ==
Supporters of expanded brown coal mining beyond the existing limits took a major blow on 26 September 2012 when parliament agreed an amendment to the Mining Act which removed the right to expropriate private property for mining purposes. The amendment was criticised by the opposition parties in parliament: parliamentary Economic Committee chairman, Milan Urban, said the amendment could cause such large damage that it could be viewed in future as high treason, while Communist Party MP Kateřina Konečná said it could “wreck the state’s economic policy”.

President Václav Klaus provided some hope to the amendment's critics when he exercised his right to veto the law change. Klaus justified his veto by saying the amendment would deprive the country of an important energy policy tool and would facilitate land speculation. “The law abolishes the institution of expropriation. Unlike the current version of the Mining Act, it provides for a very risky and problematic conflict between landowners and the owner of this mineral wealth, which is the state,” said Klaus as part of his rationale. “One can expect that the land underneath which are deposits owned by the state and which in exceptional cases it will not be possible to expropriate, will be purchased for speculative reasons with an eye to recovering a large amount of compensation from the state.”

Parliament, however, overturned Klaus's veto and reconfirmed its original amendment to the Mining Act removing the expropriation clause. The amendment was supported by 120 MPs, including the government coalition, six opposition Social Democrats, all Věci veřejné (English: Public Affairs) MPs and two independent MPs.

== New president, new threat to mining limits ==
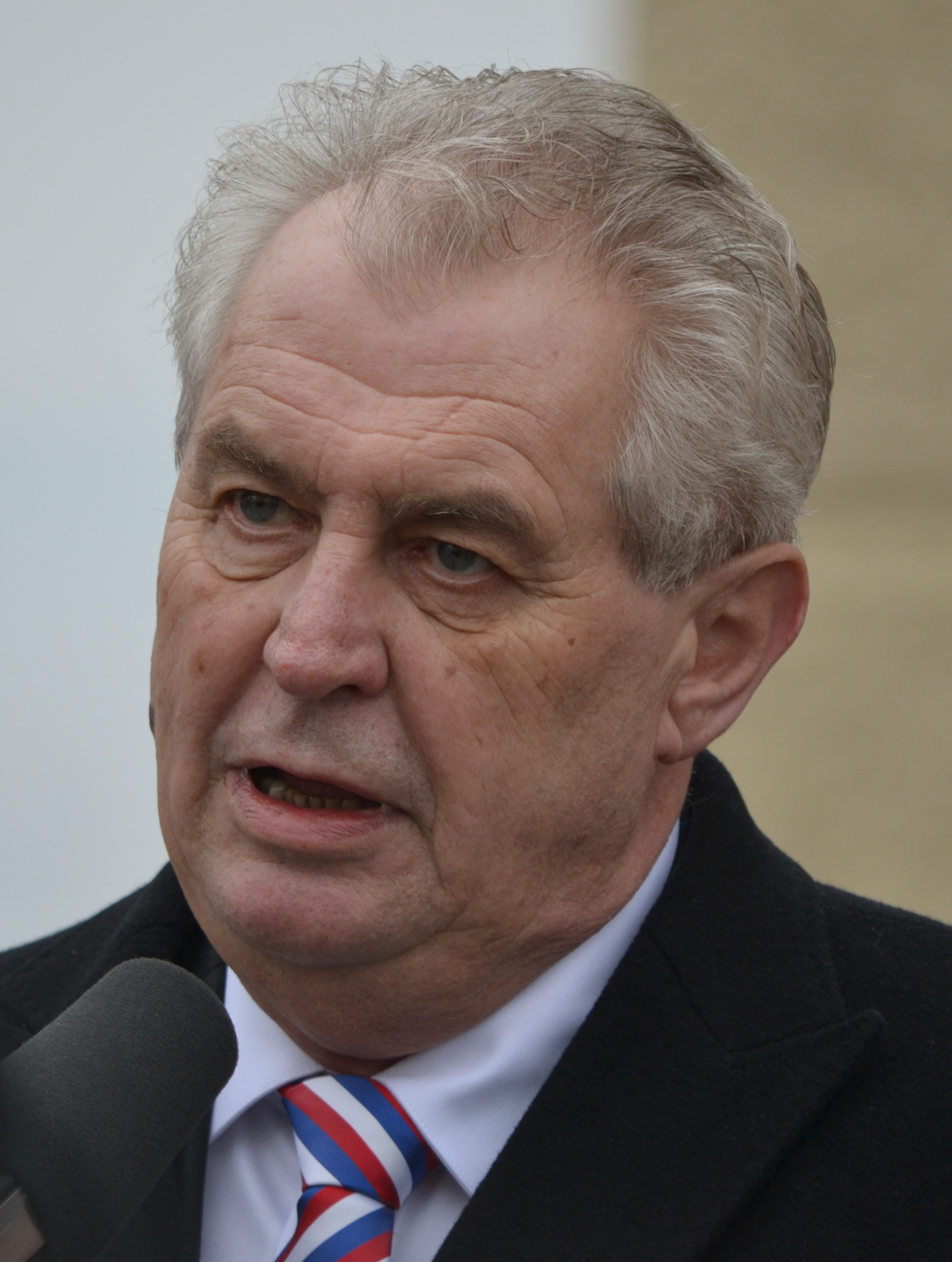
Miloš Zeman in March 2013

With the end of President Klaus's second term in office in January 2013, the two contenders to take over from him following the first round of voting in new direct elections were in opposing positions regarding the mining limits. While TOP09 leader and Minister of Foreign Affairs Karel Schwarzenberg was in favour of retaining the limits, his opponent, former Czech Social Democratic Party leader and premier from 1998 to 2002 Miloš Zeman, boasted of his opposition to the limits during the presidential election campaign.

Zeman won the presidency 55%-45%. The result was even more overwhelming in the Ústí nad Labem Region, where Zeman received 62% of the vote. Even in the voting district of Horní Jiřetín, Zeman won with 60% of the ballots cast, although this outcome was most likely to be a result of the negative campaign against Schwarzenberg that attempted to smear him as an "Austrian" apologist for the former German Sudeten population from the border regions ready to offer restitution for their lost property and his association with his highly unpopular deputy party leader, Finance Minister Miroslav Kalousek (the newspaper tabloid, Blesk, for example, published a full-page advertisement prior to the second and final round of voting alleging that Schwarzenberg was being backed by Bavarian Euro MP and German Sudeten leader Berndt Posselt, which was untrue).

Not long after his elevation to the presidency, Zeman gave his express support to communist regional hejtman Oldřich Bubeníček on the mining limits issue. Speaking soon after a meeting of all the country's regional governors with the newly elected President Zeman, Bubeníček told reports "The President agrees with the fact that in view of the difficult situation in the region, it’s necessary to continue the mining of coal there further".

== Czech Coal purchases its own power plant with question marks over its coal supply ==
The controversial owner of Czech Coal, Pavel Tykač, sold part of the group, Litvínovská uhelná (which operates the Czechoslovak Army Mine bordering the towns of Horní Jiřetín and Černice), to his two Czech Coal colleagues Jan Dienstl and Tomáš Fohler in March 2013. Tykač retained ownership of the rest of the group. The deal went through at the same time Czech Coal entered into a long expected historic contract with the half state-owned energy supplier ČEZ, which guaranteed Czech Coal sales of coal for the next 50 years at a fixed price. Czech media immediately began referring to Dienstl and Fohler as the Czech Republic's two newest “coal barons”.

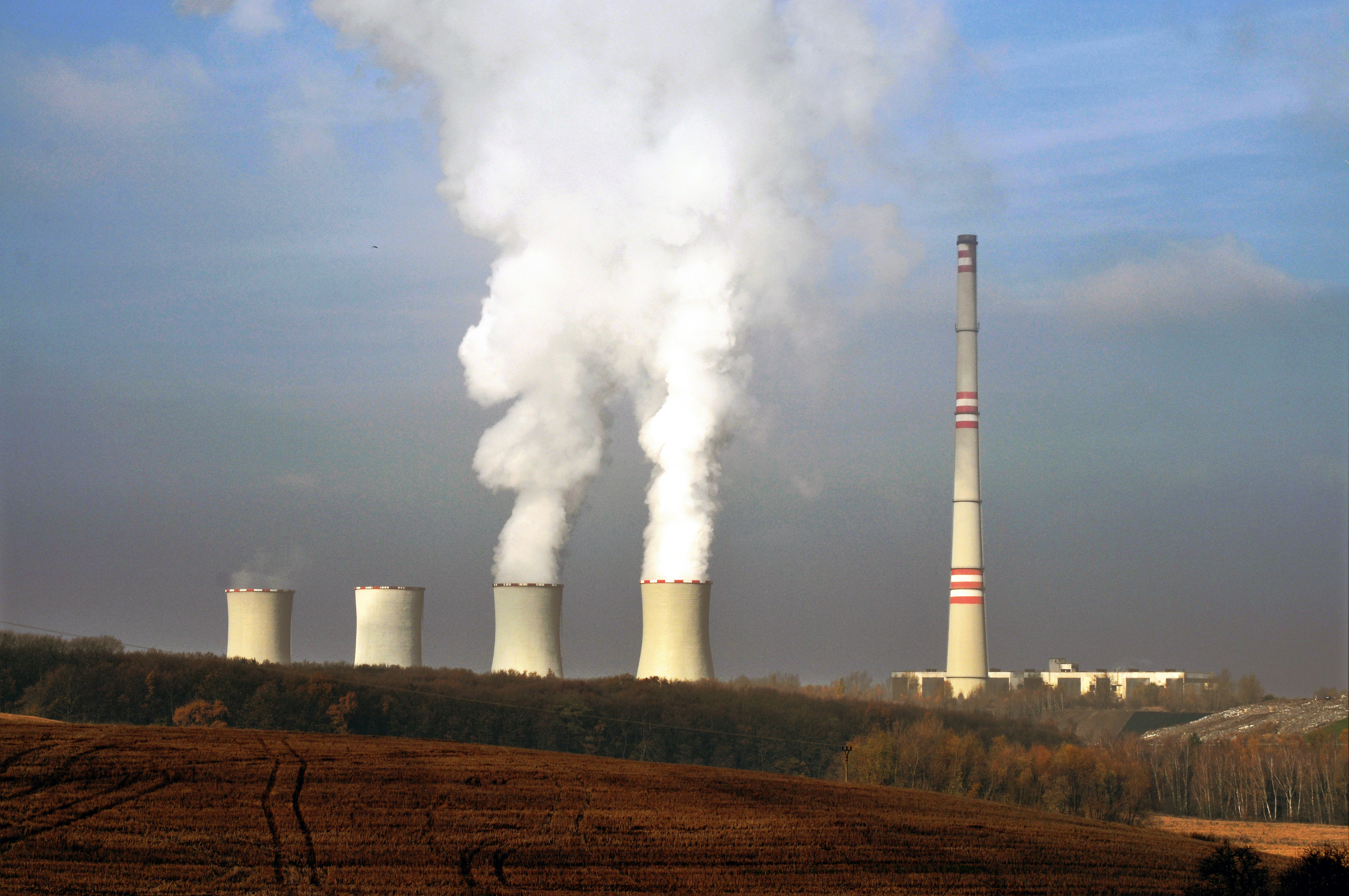
Chvaletice power plant

Shortly before this deal was made, ČEZ and Czech Coal signed the “energy deal of the century” when the former sold the Chvaletice power plant to Litvínovská uhelná for CZK 4.12 billion, which in turn follows another deal for the supply of coal by Czech Coal to Počerady, which is the most powerful power plant in the ČEZ portfolio. In August 2013, Litvínovská uhelná was officially renamed Severní energetická.

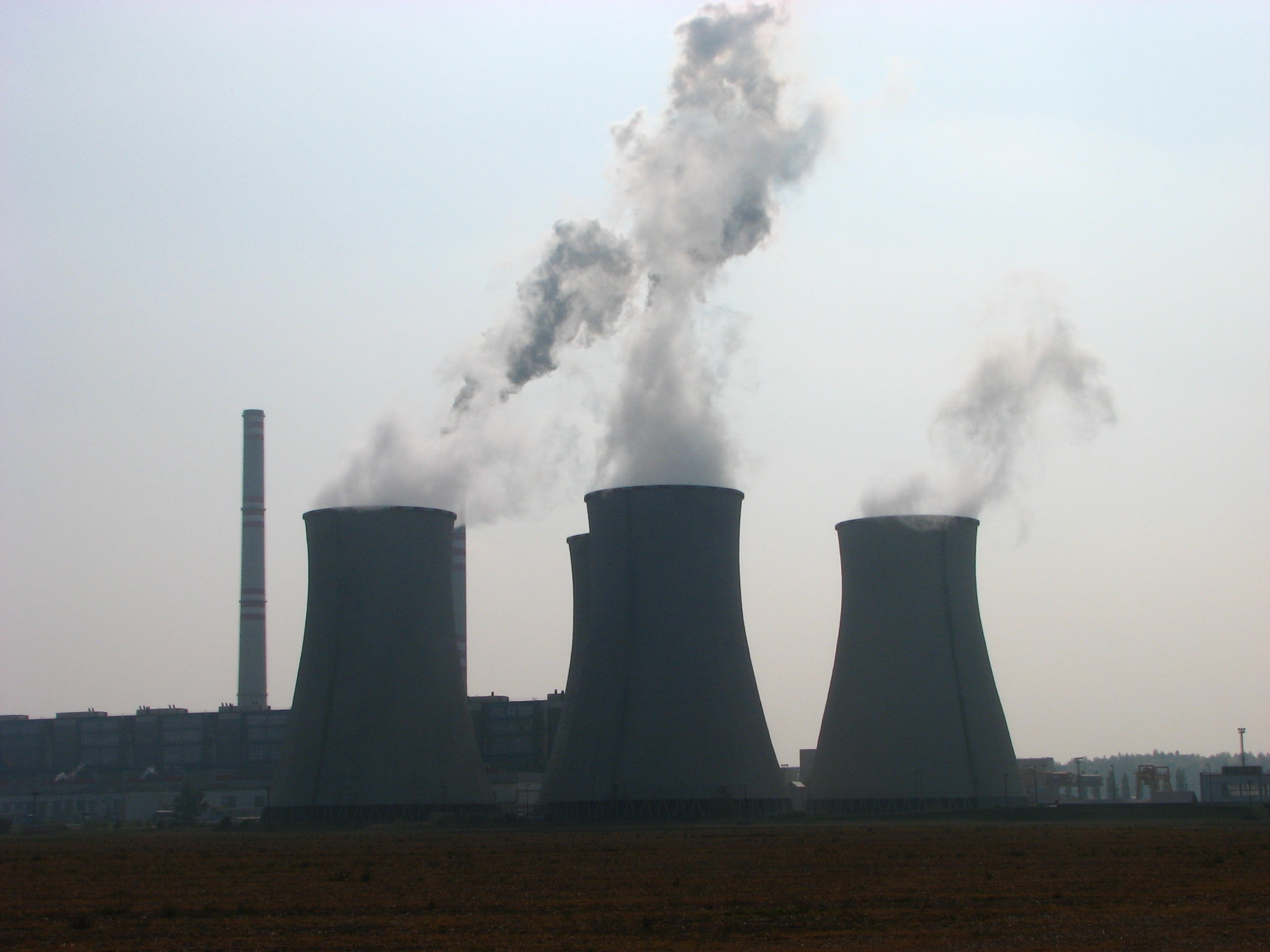
Počerady power plant

The Chvaletice deal immediately raised fears among other market players, such as that the sale of the plant to a company managed by Czech Coal executives would lead to all available coal disappearing from the Czech market. Moreover, Czech Coal also faced accusations from the Association of Heating Plants that it had intentionally provided government representatives, including the Ministry of Trade and Industry, with undervalued coal reserves and which were subsequently used in strategic government documents. “Our earlier suspicion that Czech Coal had purposefully underestimated opportunities for the mining of coal in order to push consumers to the wall and increase the price has been fully confirmed,” said Association of Heating Plants chairman and former premier Mirek Topolanek.

In December 2012, Dienstl stated in relation to the potential purchase of both Počerady and Chvaletice: “Počerady is our priority, but we can’t mine enough coal to supply both plants. Officially, Czech Coal had until then reckoned on a fall in mining at its Czechoslovak Army Mine to two million tons a year. Such an amount of coal, were it to be used solely for the Chvaletice power plant, would be difficult to justify the agreed purchase price paid by Czech Coal. Moreover, Czech Coal at the end of 2012 asserted that it had contractually guaranteed sales for all the coal it could mine in the Czechoslovak Army Mine.

More recently, Dienstl said that coal supplies for Chvaletice would come from the Czechoslovak Army Mine, adding: "Figuratively speaking, we were looking for coal all last week. In certain parts of the mine there is coal equivalent to more than 400 million gigajoules that we are able to extract. So far, it hasn’t been possible to extract it because it would be economically inefficient. But when we now have our own power plant, then efficiency is much more easily found." According to Mlada fronta dnes, it means that Czech Coal did indeed willfully and intentionally mislead not only the heating plants, but also government administration, including the Ministry of Trade and Industry during the preparation of the State Energy Plan and other strategic state documents.

Moreover, supplying Chvaletice with adequate amounts of coal raises the question of whether those supplies would have to come from beyond the mining limits at the Czechoslovak Army Mine. Part of the coal needed for Chvaletice would come from another of Czech Coal's holdings, Vršanská uhelná, while the rest would come from the side slopes of the Czechoslovak Army Mine that to date had not been economic to mine. A mining permit for one of the eastern slopes of the mine was sought with the mining administration in early 2013.

At the start of March 2013 Litvínovská uhelná filed a request with the same administration for the repeal of a ban on deep mining in two of the “protective pillars” that safeguard the adjacent slopes of the Krušný (Ore) Mountains from slippage. The listed building of Jezeří Chateau stands on them, while Horní Jiřetín and Černice lie beneath them.

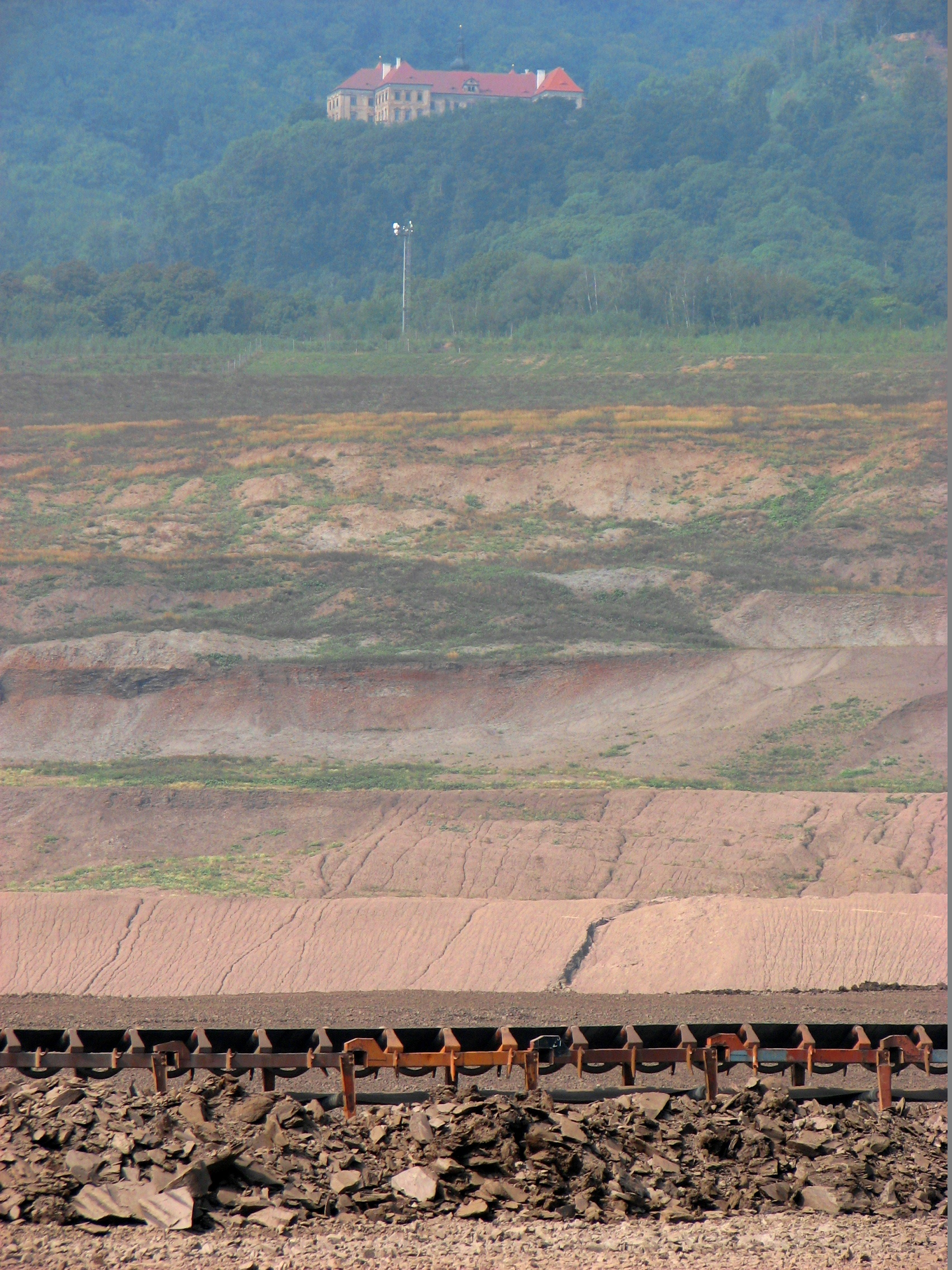
Jezeří Chateau from inside the Czechoslovak Army Mine

A total of 20 million tons of so far forbidden coal reserves are estimated to lie beneath the slope where the chateau is located. This amount would be enough to supply Chvaletice for roughly 10 years. But coal from deep mines could not be counted on for several more years. According to Litvínovská uhelná spokesperson, Gabriela Benešová, the mining company would use a method called pillar mining which does not disrupt the stability of the pillars and therefore neither the slope above the coal seam.

Greenpeace has stated its intention of halting or hindering the approval process. "We will try to ensure that the miners can’t get to the protective pillars safeguarding the stability of the Krušný Mountain slopes. If that fails, we will at least want the populated areas and their surrounds to remain untouchable by the deep mines up to a distance of 500 m", said Jan Rovenský of the Greenpeace energy section.

The Ministry of Environment gave the green light to deep mining in mid-November, albeit with 22 conditions that would make mining method environmentally acceptable in the Czechoslovak Army Mine. According to Ministry spokesman, Matyáš Vitík, the Ministry addressed 16 different professional organisations with the competency to say whether deep mining would have any effect on the environment. “The overwhelming majority of them responded that it wouldn’t be necessary to do an EIA [Environmental Impact Assessment]”, said Vitík. Vitík added, however, that the Ministry was not able to permit or prohibit deep mining, but only set conditions regarding the environment. “Protection of the environment, including the health and lives of the population, is guaranteed.” Residents in Horní Jiřetín, however, are afraid that deep mines in the adjacent slopes of the opencast mine may cause further landslides. The municipal authority is therefore considering whether it should take the matter up with the state mining administration.

== Marketing campaigns to influence public opinion ==
According to Litvínovská uhelná co-owner Jan Dienstl, repealing the mining limits will save jobs and help to develop the region. Dienstl said in April 2013 there were 23.2 million tons of coal left in the seams currently being excavated up to the mining limits, which would take another 10 years to mine fully, after which the Czechoslovak Army Mine would be closed. “We’ll lay off 1,000 people, which is one thing, but related to that another two or three thousand jobs will go in the region. From a regional point of view it's a problem, but from the perspective of Most, it’s a tragedy,” said Dienstl. “If the limits can be repealed, the lifespan of the mine would be extended by 150 years.”

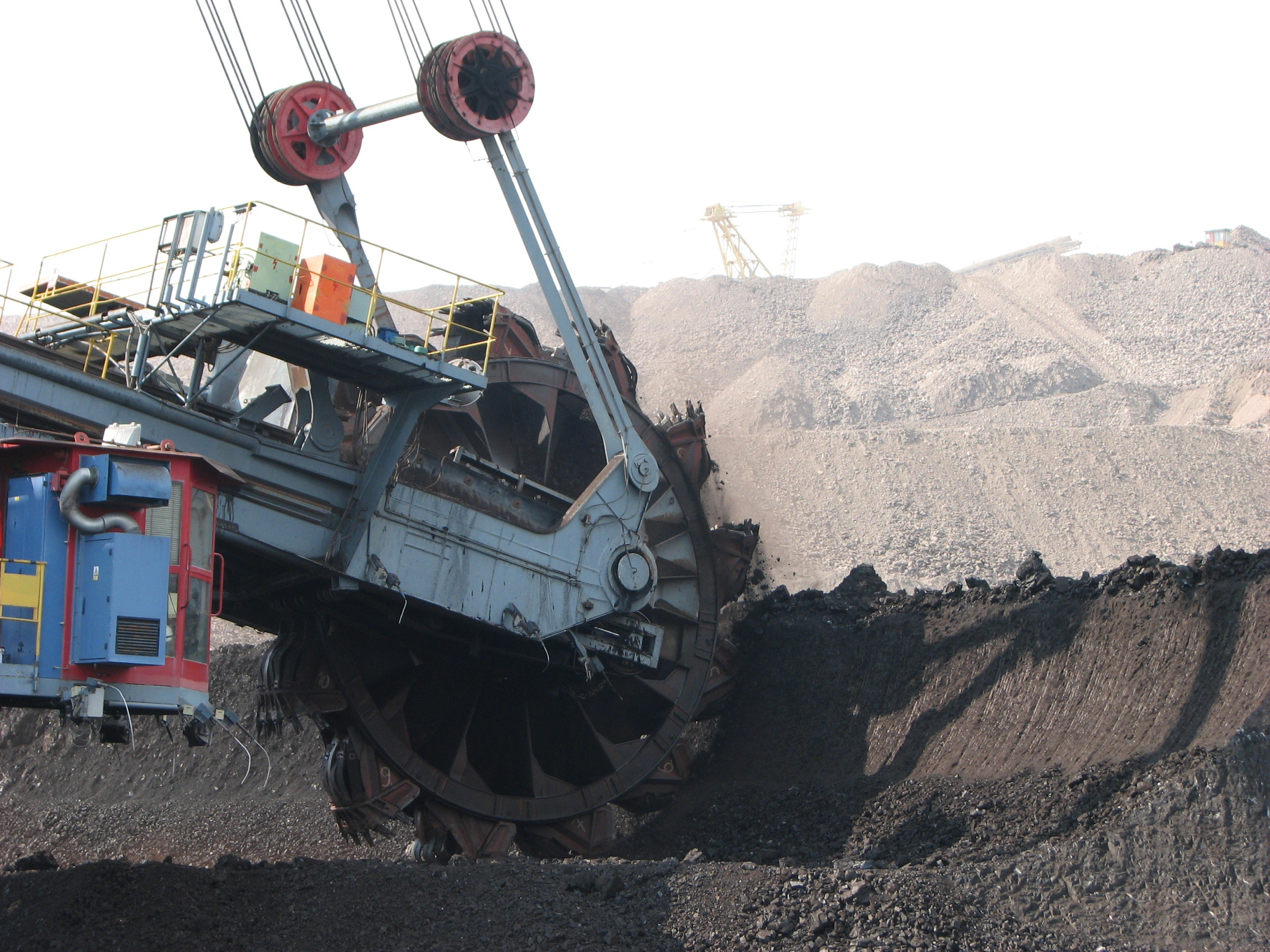
Wheel bucket excavator at the Czechoslovak Army Mine

The mining company would, therefore, try to convince the inhabitants of the region that it was worth breaching the limits. Dienstl admitted, however, that the demolition of Černice and Horní Jiřetína would be a major problem. It was, therefore, necessary to reach a consensus that the coal beyond the limits was needed.

The key contemporary problem, according to Dienstl, was that people from around the mine had nothing themselves from the mining. "If the mine closes, they won't have anything at all anymore because there won’t even be work from it…In today's times of crisis, a lot of people realize that it’s very important that there are investors there and that there’s work there," said Dienstl. People would have to lose their homes as a result of expanded mining, but they should also get a generous offer for the sale of their properties. "An offer like this hasn’t yet been made here at such a level that it would be taken seriously and that if someone agreed with it they would get it. This is a key issue," Dienstl said.

To help win over the region's population, Czech Coal launched a billboard campaign throughout the Ústí nad Labem Region in early 2013 that played upon fears within the local population of higher unemployment should mining operations become severely curtained by its inability to mine beyond the limits. The theme of the campaign was “security for the region” and featured images of local residents in a variety of occupations, such as baker, electrician, miner, etc., whose livelihoods would be “threatened by the slow-down in mining. The gradual restrictions on operations and lay-offs will also negatively impact on their business, especially in a decline in orders and sales.” The images were accompanied in each case with the caption “I also have a job thanks to coal!”.

In July 2013, Litvínovská uhelná hired the STEM research agency to conduct a survey of public opinion in Horní Jiřetín and Černice in connection with its intention to continue mining coal beyond the limits after 2023. The initial research would be preparation for potentially moving the population to new homes.

"The aim of the survey is to initiate a broader discussion with the residents and get the truest possible picture of the opinions, demands and views of the citizens of Horní Jiřetín and Černice for dealing with their situation in the event that the current mining limits are repealed," said company spokeswoman Gabriela Sáričková-Benesova. "The local experience there shows that the sensitive issue of resettling communities can be carefully resolved to the satisfaction of all parties," Sáričková-Benesova added. STEM is tasked with delivering objective and comprehensive information about the feelings and opinions of local residents. Czech Coal claimed it was following a model similar to foreign projects, mainly in Germany where thousands of people have been moved because of mining.

Horní Jiřetína Deputy Mayor Vladimír Buřt called the research a new strategy used by the mining lobby. He said Czech Coal would use the information from the respected STEM agency this year to make new offers for the purchase of real estate. After Litvínovská uhelná changed its name to Severní energetická in August 2013, it initiated a new marketing campaign featuring individuals and small groups of people wearing green T-shirts against a background of a power plant or an excavator accompanied with the slogan “Don’t pay for sun [or wind]. Choose Czech energy.” Greenpeace parodied this campaign by asking its supporters to “creatively modify” the Severní energetická posters by suggesting new slogans. The results included: “We’ll bulldoze your homes. Choose brown coal”, “Don’t pay for the sun, pay for a lunarscape”, and “Pay with your life. Choose Czech energy”.

== A fall in government provides a new opportunity for pro-mining interests ==
Prime Minister Petr Nečas resigned and his government collapsed amid a corruption scandal in June 2013. President Zeman rejected the candidate nominated by ODS to replace Nečas and form a new caretaker government until new elections could be held. Instead, Zeman elected to choose his own temporary prime minister to form a government of “experts”. The man he chose was Jiří Rusnok, Zeman's personal economics advisor and a former Finance Minister in Zeman's government 1998–2002. Rusnok's government lost a vote of confidence in August, triggering elections in late October 2013 when it became apparent that no grouping in parliament could elicit the support needed to form a new government. Some of the people Rusnok had appointed to his cabinet became candidates for Zeman's political party (The Party of Civic Rights - Zeman's People) in those elections, resulting in acute embarrassment to them after the party failed to score more than 1.5% of the vote. (Note: The 2013 parliamentary elections were a disaster for the traditional parties. The Social Democrats barely came out on top with 20.45% of the vote (an outcome so low below expectations that it triggered a failed internal party coup against its leader, Bohuslav Sobotka), while the ODS gained a mere 7.7% - its worst showing since 1992. TOP 09 also took a battering, but bested its ODS rival on the right wing with 12% of the vote. The Communist Party maintained its usual support of 14.9%, but the main victor was the new political movement ANO, which took 18.6% at its first contested election and went on to claim the finance portfolio for its leader, Andrej Babiš. The Christian Democrats were returned to parliament with 6.8% after spending the previous electoral cycle out in the cold, while another new movement, Tomio Okamura's Úsvit movement, ended up with 6.9% of votes cast.)

Rusnok's government continued to govern in a caretaker capacity until the formation of a new government approved by Zeman. In the meantime, Rusnok promised that his cabinet would not make any decisions about changes to the limits in relation to debating the state's raw materials policy. “We certainly won’t pass any binding decisions to dismantle the limits or introduce new ones" Rusnok said.

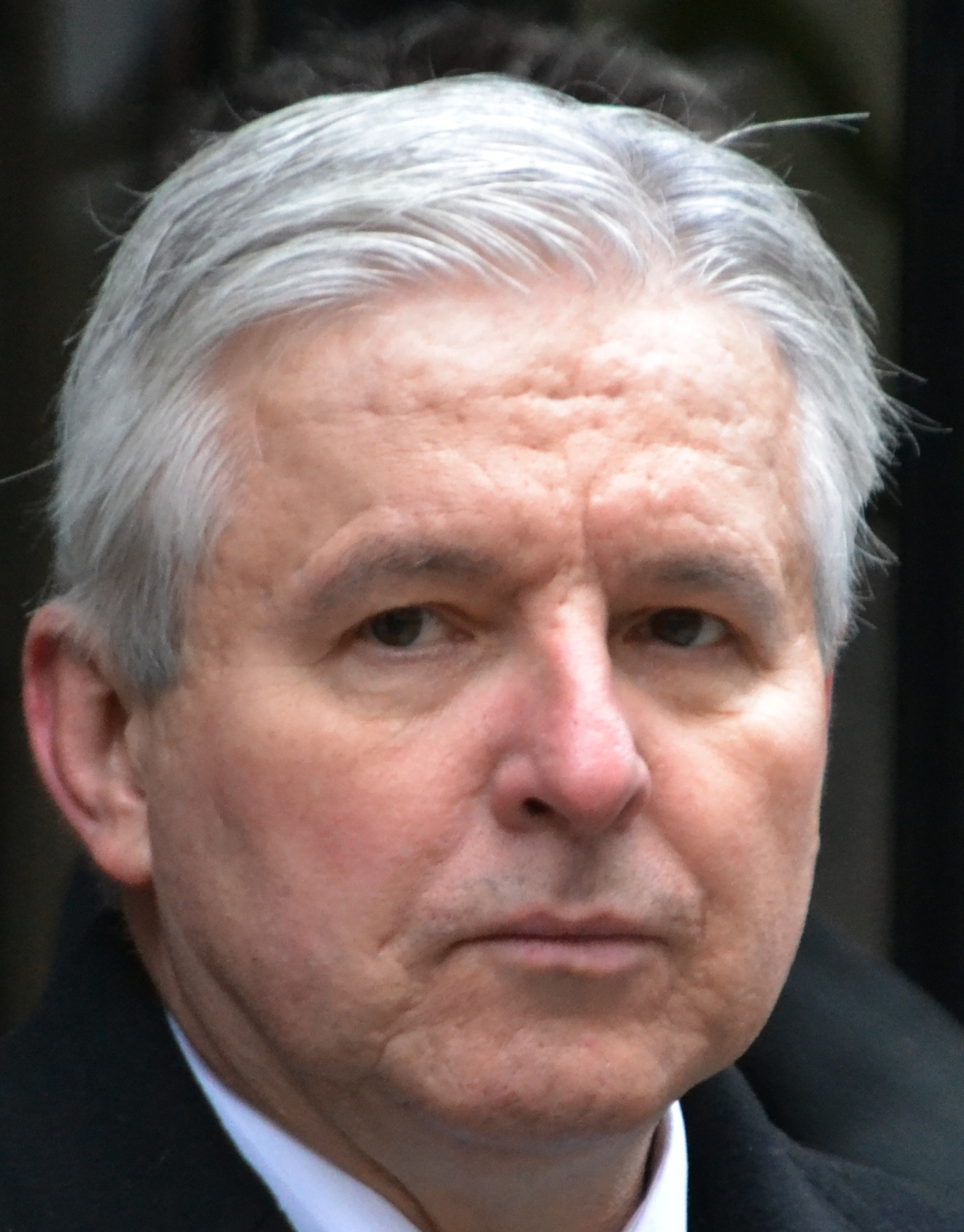
Caretaker Prime Minister Jiří Rusnok

Speaking at a press conference after the vote of no confidence, Rusnok was asked whether his caretaker government was intent on debating the state's raw materials policy in light of an earlier statement that he would not make any fundamental decisions about the state's direction. Rusnok responded by saying he did not know what the points of discussion would be on the next government agenda. "So I wouldn’t have any fears - don't worry, I'm sure nothing will come up that would be somehow problematic, intractable and too binding on future governments. There is really no need to worry. By the way, as a big ecologist I am a supporter of preserving the limits, although I say this as Jiří Rusnok, not as the Prime Minister in regard to the mining limits." Later maneuvering by Rusnok was to prove highly controversial in light of these comments.

During the following month, President Zeman reiterated his support for dismantling the mining limits. Remarking that the president should not be a "silent Sphinx", Zeman said that 8,500 jobs would be lost in Mostecko if the limits were not repealed. If the mining boundaries were shifted, the Czech Republic would be fundamentally less dependent on foreign energy sources.

"I listened to both the opinions of the mining company owners and union representatives. And of course I got know to the opinions of the leadership of the Ústí nad Labem Region. The biggest problem of the Ústí nad Labem Region is the excessively high rate of unemployment – the highest of all the regions in the Czech Republic. It is necessary to combat this joblessness and even accept measures which are unpopular in the eyes of some," said Zeman. “I believe I’ve been adequately informed about the quality of coal that is to be found for example beneath Horní Jiřetín and other villages.” Zeman added that since the expropriation clause had been removed from the Mining Act, the mining lobby could only purchase property by agreement with the owners and by offering conditions that would be favourable to them.

Responding to Zeman's comments, Green Party leader Ondřej Liška said: "Miloš Zeman today definitively confirmed that he’s out of it. After supporting the tobacco industry, this is another Zeman excess that confirms he’s primarily the president of various lobby interests to the detriment of people’s health. Support for smoking and burning coal can maybe only be trumped by celebrating land mines."

Following closely in Zeman's footsteps, Rusnok visited Most in mid-November 2013 and stated while he was there that his government would deal with the issue of the mining limits. He called the 1991 government resolution that established the limits “outmoded and obsolete” and did not rule out re-evaluating them. Asked whether the resolution could be annulled, Rusnok said: “I’m not ruling out any options”.

Given Rusnok's earlier statement that he personally supported the mining limits and would not make any fundamental political decisions while in office, this new announcement provoked immediate reactions from opponents and supporters alike. The head of the Greenpeace energy campaign, Jan Rovenský, said: “Rusnok just elastically bent his spine 180 degrees. At a government press conference three months ago he claimed that as a big environmentalist he was an opponent of breaching the limits, and now he’s claiming they are vexatious and his government will probably cancel them…Rusnok’s caretaker government has no authority to make irreversible decisions about anything at all, let alone fundamental matters.”

Former Prime Minister and Social Democrat shadow environment minister, Vladimír Špidla, also weighed into the debate: “By taking this step Jiří Rusnok has clearly exceeded the mandate of his government, which didn’t obtain the confidence of the Chamber of Deputies, and is therefore only a caretaker government according to the Constitution. Rusnok’s government doesn’t have the right to decide on issues of such strategic importance, such as the mining limits, which are also highly sensitive and controversial.”

The town of Horní Jiřetín also issued a press statement on Rusnok's pronouncement: "We’re sorry that during his visit to Mostecko, Jiří Rusnok didn’t also go to Horní Jiřetín or Litvínov. He’s thus one in a long line of prime ministers and ministers, who after arriving in the region go first to kowtow to the coal barons and for whom [the former coal company] Mostecká uhelná is synonymous with the entire Most area. We would consider it natural if the Prime Minister had also come to hear the opinions and attitudes of the opponents of breaching the limits - people who frequently throughout their lives have to suffer all the negative impacts of opencast coal mining and whose fate the mining boundaries directly affect. He could also find out that Ore Mountain foothills are not just about coal and that the future of the region based on other foundations than only coal and coal-fired power generation is above all realistic and realisable. We'd also like to discuss the issue of employment with the Prime Minister. It would be good for him to hear that annulling the limits would not bring about a positive impact on employment in the region, but rather the contrary."

The mayor of Litvínov, Milan Štovíček, called Rusnok's statement a "dirty trick" played on the population of the Ústí nad Labem Region. "I personally see it as the biggest scam on the people since 1989. This is what only totalitarian governments allowed in the past and which sacrificed this region and the local people for the purpose of making some money." His municipal colleague from Horní Jiřetín, Vladimír Buřt, agreed the caretaker government had no mandate. “The government, which does not answer to anybody at all apart from Miloše Zeman and various energy and other lobbies, shouldn’t make any such decisions.“ “Thanks to the limits, municipalities lying in protected mineral deposit areas or mining areas can actually do something. They can make zoning plans, they can build and renew.”

Ústí nad Labem Region hejtman, Oldřich Bubeníček, on the other hand, welcomed Rusnok's statement. "I’m glad that the government understands that it’s not only about the employees of the Czechoslovak Army Mine, but also about thousands of other people who depend on mining.“

The Kořeny Civic Association issued a statement saying it was unacceptable that a government that had not been formed on the basis of fair elections and did not have the confidence of the Chamber of Deputies would make decisions over such a fundamental issue. “In addition, Jiří Rusnok has broken his promise that his government would not decide about the mining limits for these very reasons.”

“We have no doubt that the Zemanovci [Zeman’s people] wish to make the situation easier for the miners at the last minute, as Miloš Zeman himself has tried to do. However, it is important to note that the Zemanovci obtained a mere 1.5% on the basis of an election manifesto that included the breaching of the mining limits, and therefore they don’t have even a hypothetical mandate for making this decision. The mining limits as stipulated in the current legislation represent an essential safeguard for local communities from destruction. The question of breaking the limits, bulldozing towns and the further devastation of the Most area is too complex a problem to be hastily decided upon by Rusnok’s current government.”

Reacting to Rusnok's statement, the expected Prime Minister-in-waiting, Social Democrat leader Bohuslav Sobotka, asked President Zeman that the government that he installed with Rusnok as Prime Minister not make any “fundamental, strategic, long-term” decisions, and cited the mining limits as an example.

Nearly a week later, on 26 August, supporters of maintaining the limits staged in a demonstration in the regional capital, Usti nad Labem. Approximately one hundred participated in the event while a counter-demonstration was arranged by the mining union, which also attracted roughly the same number. Both sides were divided by a busy street. A mining spokesman expressed satisfaction that the counter-demonstration had been convened so quickly. “So that the politicians don’t think that according to this handful of madmen everyone in the region is for preserving the limits,” he said.

Former Environment Minister Martin Bursík, attending the demonstration in support of the mining limits, clashed with Communist Party regional hejtman Oldřich Bubeníček. “Why don’t you defend the interests of the citizens of this region? Those interests also include the health of the population and the health of the environment. Unemployment is a result of the mining and the fact that the region is set up on that very basis,” said Bursík. He added that the problem was the way the region was structured and that he [Bubeníček] was unable to offer a different future and work with greater added value.

Bubeníček responded by saying that the government in which Bursík had also been a member had done nothing in that time for the region to find some alternative and stop mining. "It wouldn't bother me if there was no mining, but nothing had been found in that time," said Bubeníček.

Responding to these criticisms, Rusnok insisted that it was perfectly valid for his government to consider repealing the limits and making changes to the Czech Republic's energy plan. "We will still deal with it – we consider it a matter that can’t be delayed. Political governments for reasons that are not completely clear to me have a fear of symbolic issues like the mining limits," said Rusnok.

Joining the debate, Green Party leader Ondřej Liška warned that the potential repeal of the limits would open the door to an amendment to the Mining Act that would provide for the re-entry of an expropriation clause. According to Liška, Rusnok's government "wants to take irreversible steps in favour of the breaching of the limits so that the following government can't do anything about it". Referring to Minister of Industry and Trade Jiří Cienciala's proposal for the state to create a join company with miners, Liška said: "This whole state and Severní energetické company is about nothing more than promoting the reinsertion of expropriation into the Mining Act. Naturally, it would be hard for society to swallow expropriation that benefits private mining interests, so it's looking at this trick to get the state involved so that expropriation is in the public interest. It's nothing more than an assassination of the whole region and it has to be stopped."

Finally, after a meeting between Rusnok and the mayors of the affected towns, it was announced that Rusnok's government would not make any decision regarding the mining limits following such a recommendation by newly elected MPs. Litvínov mayor Milan Šťovíček said the government could not sacrifice the homes of thousands of people and swap them for increased profits of mining company owners. "If the Czechoslovak Army Mine were to come within sight of the Janov housing estate [in Litvinov], and it's planned to within about 500 m, it would naturally mean a significant deterioration in the environment for the town's inhabitants. It would have many consequences, including a fall in property prices...We realise that it's far from decided. But we take it that this government will not decide without commentary proceedings. It's very good that the prime minister finally took such a decision".

Šťovíček and his fellow mayors from Horní Jiřetín, Háje u Duchcova, and Nová Ves v Horách also held discussions with the incoming prime minister, Bohuslav Sobotka. They asked that the issue of the mining limits be embedded in the next government's programme. Sobotka told them the limits would be dealt with in the coalition agreement: "It's clearly stated in the coalition agreement that the (future) government will focus on the issue of the breaching of the limits in the context of energy and resource policies and make a decision within a two-year horizon.

== New Social Democrat-led government searches for a solution to the limits ==
Despite Sobotka's pledge that the mining limits issue would be dealt with in the coalition agreement, it was eventually dropped from the final draft. The newly installed ANO Minister of Environment, Richard Brabec, explained that this was the result of pressure from other coalition partners, but he was nevertheless confident that the new government would not repeal the limits. "ANO had a clear declaration that it would maintain the limits. A clearer statement dropped out of the government policy statement. It got in there only in the form that is in the coalition agreement, i.e. that repealing the limits will ensue from an update of the state energy plan," Brabec explained. I am convinced that even though it's not in the policy statement, the reality will really be what we have promised - that there will be no breaching of the mining limits. Yes, the Ministry of Environment wanted to have it mentioned there more explicitly. But at the moment it's a compromise between the coalition partners." Brabec rejected the argument that if there were no immediate decision on lifting the limits there would be no coal for heating plants and thousands of people would lose their jobs. He said that would not happen in the immediate future.

In the immediate wake of Brabec's statement, Greenpeace published survey results it had commissioned on attitudes to the mining limits in the Ústí nad Labem Region. They showed that fully 70% in the region rejected the demolition of communities for the purpose of extracting coal. Of this figure, 51% rejected the lifting of the limits outright, while a further 18% favoured maintenance of the limits where towns would be directly affected.

Meanwhile, Social Democrat Minister of Industry and Trade, Jan Mládek, traveled to the region himself to conduct his own research into the arguments from the opposing camps. Mládek admitted during his visit that postponement of the extensions to the nuclear power plant in Temelín in South Bohemia would play a part in the decision-making over coal and the mining limits. He also did not rule out the possibility of organising a regional referendum to the gauge the attitudes of the local population. He did not take recent surveys conducted by either Greenpeace or mining interests as conclusive. "A survey is one of the inputs into the debate, but on the other hand someone always has to pay", said Mládek. Mládek added that he would personally prefer a compromise between lifting and not lifting the limits. Whatever the decision would be, the government would not take any fundamental steps in 2014, but a decision would be made within the next two years.

On his return to the region in early 2015, Mládek announced that the state would most likely repeal the limits to permit further extraction around the coal mine near the town of Bílina where no demolition of houses would be required. In the case of the Czechoslovak Army Mine modification of the limits would be considered without the demolition of Černice and Horní Jiřetín. The government would focus on the limits in March as part of its evaluation of the state's raw material policy when the minister would also propose a ten-fold increase in payments made to town affected by mining. Mládek added that the lifting of the limits in the case of Bílina had been under preparation for a long time with the cooperation and agreement of the surrounding communities. It would ensure work for a further generation of people from 2030 to 2055 and would guarantee heating for four million people dependent on lignite-fired central heating systems, he said.

According to Environment Minister Brabec, it would have to be clear before any possible lifting of the limits that there was a need for the coal. "We have to be sure that we really need the coal, when we will need it and what we need it for. Using the coal from the North Bohemian mines in a way that we extract it, burn it, produce electricity from it and export it, and all for very little money because prices today are very low, is absolutely the worst way of using this coal," said Brabec, adding that he did not yet know the details of Mládek proposals.
