= Czech Coal Group =

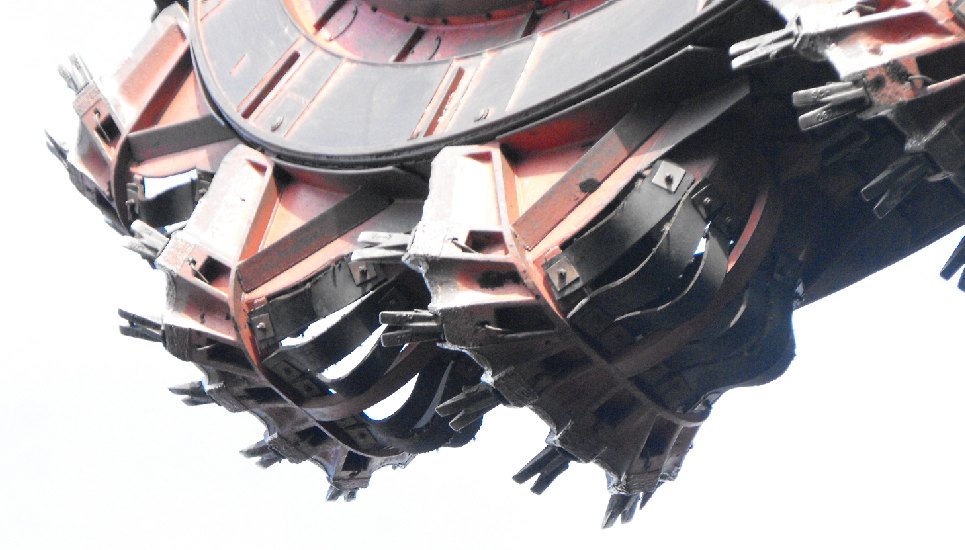
Bucket-wheel excavator at the Czechoslovak Army coal mine

Czech Coal Group (usually shortened to Czech Coal) was established in 2005 with assets that included the Mostecká uhelná společnost mining company and the electricity trading company, Czech Coal a.s. In 2008, Mostecká uhelná společnost was broken up into two separate mining companies. The Group consists of the following entities:

- Czech Coal Services a.s. – a trader in energy commodities providing shared services to the Group
- the Litvínovská uhelná a.s. coal mining company with the largest coal reserves in the Czech Republic
- the Vršanská uhelná a.s. coal mining company with allegedly enough coal to continue operating until approximately 2055 within the brown coal mining limits in North Bohemia
- a number of subsidiary service companies operating in the areas of earthworks, freight and transport; construction and construction machinery; servicing, assembly and renovation of conveyor belts; conveyor servicing and installation; reclamation; leasing services; IT services; sporting activities (i.e. a horse race course)

Czech Coal allegedly controls the largest coal reserves in the Czech Republic. The company states that it has coal reserves within existing mining limits that will last until 2052, and should the reserves beyond the limits become accessible they would last until beyond 2100. Czech Coal's consolidated sales in 2011 were more than CZK 13.15 billion.

== Controversial owner ==
The effective owner of Czech Coal with 50% of its shares is the controversial financier, Pavel Tykač. Tykač originally purchased a 40% share in the company in spring 2006 and then quickly increased that share to 49% for allegedly nearly CZK 10 billion. Tykač purchased the remaining 1% from his partners Petr Pudil and Vasil Bobela in 2009.

Tykač is a multibillionaire (in CZK) and the fifth richest man in the Czech Republic, who apart from his holding in Czech Coal also operates on the real estate and financial markets. He has been described as “a person with the reputation of an unscrupulous player and secretive pirate of Czech business comparable to Gordon Gekko …, professing greed as the highest virtue”.

His earlier activities on the financial market in the 1990s included the acquisition of CS Fund, the asset manager of three smaller investment funds, which Tykač divested himself of just a few weeks before it was ‘tunneled’ or defrauded in March 1997. The most valuable acquisition of his investment company, Motoinvest, established in 1991, however, was Agrobanka. It was this company that financed most of Tykač’s activities, which before long led it to the brink of ruin as the bank was unable to meet its liabilities, leading to the intervention the Czech National Bank to rescue its clients by pumping CZK 20 billion into it. Tykač was investigated by the police in 2006 over the tunneling of CS Fund, but the later prosecution was later suspended. In 2012, František Bušek alleged in court that he assisted Tykač in defrauding CS Fund of CZK 1.23 billion. Tykač said the allegation was the result of an earlier failed attempt by Bušek to blackmail him. Tykač kept a very low profile from the late 1990s only to re-emerge in 2006 with his purchase of shares in Czech Coal, since when he has aggressively defended the price demands of the company and lobbied for the cancellation of the brown coal mining limits in North Bohemia, beyond which lie huge coal reserves.

Further examples of Tykač’s alleged unscrupulousness include posting letters to the wives of shareholders who were refusing to sell him a Czech Coal competitor, Sokolovské uhelné, urging them to talk their husbands into the deal, and the way he dealt with a run-down but listed residence he owned in the exclusive Prague quarter of Vinohrady – it mysteriously caught fire twice and was eventually demolished without permission.

== Mining limits ==
Czech Coal is one of two coal mining companies affected by the limits placed around mining operations in the North Bohemian coal basin approved by parliament in 1991. The other company is Severočeské doly. The limits restrict Czech Coal operations at the following open cast mines:

- Czechoslovak Army Mine
- Jan Šverma Mine
- Vršany Mine
- Bílina Mine

Without the limits in place, mining activities would continue along the bottom of the slopes of the Ore Mountains, effectively destroy the townships of Horní Jiřetín and Černice, continue to within 500m of the town of Litvínov, and eventually encompass the area under the large-scale chemical plant and oil refinery at Záluží before terminating near the site of the former royal city of Most, which was demolished in the 1960s–1980s to extract the mineral deposits beneath and where Lake Most is now located.

Czech Coal would like to have the mining limits lifted and efforts in this regard have led to open conflict with environmental NGOs some of the region's inhabitants, particularly those residing in the path of any further mining operations beyond the existing boundaries, i.e. Horní Jiřetín and Černice. Czech Coal alleges that 280 metric tons of high quality coal lie beneath the town of Horní Jiřetín, and the company has been making concerted efforts to convince the local population of the necessity to mine under their land and to come to an agreement on the amount of compensation that would be paid. According to Czech Coal's regional policy spokesperson, Liběna Novotná, the company has approached nearly all property owners in Horní Jiřetín, 75% of whom were willing to discuss a future process, and of these 60% directly indicated which variant of compensation they would choose. Despite the fact that Horní Jiřetín residents earlier voted overwhelmingly to protect their town from mining, Novotná believes it only a matter of time before the majority of inhabitants agree to compensation and relocation. “Even in Germany, where relocation has been taking placed for dozens of years, it hasn't been easy. We can in all likelihood expect that there will be a group of people in Horní Jiřetín who will take longer to be convinced. We want to act in accordance with valid legislation and European standards, and if mining companies in Germany were able to reach an agreement with mining opponents, then I'm sure we can, too.”
