= Milan Šťovíček =

Czech politician

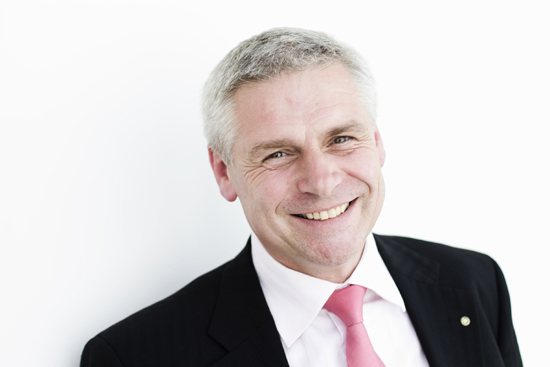

Deputy Mayor of Litvínov
- Incumbent
- Assumed office 6 December 2014

Mayor of Litvínov
- In office 11 November 2010 – 6 December 2014

Member of the Chamber of Deputies
- In office 29 May 2010 – 28 August 2013

Personal details
- Born: January 27, 1958 (age 68) Litvínov, Czechoslovakia (now Czech Republic)
- Party: ODS (2001−2009); Věci veřejné (2010−2012); STAN
- Education: Pedagogy Faculty, University of Hradec Králové
- Profession: Teacher

Milan Šťovíček (* 27 January 1958 Litvínov) is a Czech politician, a Member of Parliament from 2010 to 2013, and Mayor of the North Bohemian town of Litvínov from 2006 to 2009, and again from 2010 to 2014. He became Deputy Mayor of Litvínov following the December 2014 municipal elections after his party came in fourth place. He is one of the most prominent opponents in North-West Bohemia of repealing the brown coal mining limits in Mostecko.

== Education and professional career ==
Šťovíček graduated from grammar school in 1977 and then worked as a zoologist at the District Museum in North-West Bohemian city of Most. He later studied at the Pedagogy Faculty of the University of Hradec Králové and taught at primary school in Meziboří u Litvínova. He became principal of this school in 1990. In 1992 he became the principal of the specialist secondary school for environmental protection and renewal Schola Humanitas in Litvínov.

== Political career ==
In 2001 Šťovíček joined the ODS and was elected Deputy Mayor of Litvínov on its ticket in June 2003 and later mayor. In March 2009 he was removed from the mayoralty by his own party colleagues after which he returned to Schola Humanitas. In October 2009 he resigned from functions and terminated his membership in ODS.

He has long been an opponent of efforts to repeal the coal mining limits in the vicinity of Litvínov which would result in mining operations at the Czechoslovak Army Mine encroaching within 500m of homes in the city. In May 2010 he was elected the lead regional candidate of the newly formed political party Věcí veřejné in the Ustí region to the Chamber of Deputies of the Parliament of the Czech Republic. From May 2011 he was party deputy leader and in November 2010 he was returned to the post of mayor of Litvínov for the party in municipal elections. In April 2012 he resigned as deputy leader of Věci veřejné and on 1 November 2012 he was kicked out of the party because even after his departure from the party he continued to support the government of Petr Nečas. In April 2013 he joined the parliamentary grouping of TOP 09 and Mayors and Independents and later became a signed-up member.

His greatest political success was the removal of the expropriation clause from the Mining Act - he had earlier pushed for this point in the coalition agreement between ODS, TOP 09 and Věci veřejné and subsequently its passage through parliament (including over-ruling the veto of President Václav Klaus). Without the expropriation clause, mining companies cannot obtain the houses and land of local people without their consent. People in towns threatened by demolition because of coal mining (Horní Jiřetín and Černice in North-West Bohemia, as well as Karviná - Staré Město in East Moravia) are now thus protected from forced removal.

Opponents of the removal of the expropriation clause in the lower house of parliament (particularly MP Milan Urban) mockingly christened the amendment of the Mining Act "Lex Šťovíček".

In the municipal elections of 2014 Šťovíček defended his position as a town councilor in Litvínov when he led the ticket for Mayors and Independents. However, the movement came in fourth place and Šťovíček was hence unable to continue as mayor. He was, however, elected second deputy mayor.
