= Vladimír Buřt =

Czech local politician

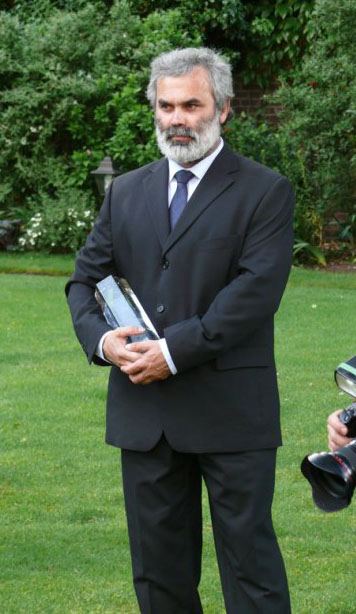
- Buřt with the 2009 Josef Vavroušek Award

Member of the Ústí nad Labem regional council
- In office 13 October 2012 – 8 October 2016

Mayor of Horní Jiřetín
- Incumbent
- Assumed office 3 October 2014
- Preceded by: Branko Glavica

Deputy Mayor of Horní Jiřetín
- In office 2006–2014

Personal details
- Born: 16 March 1964 (age 62) Albrechtice, Czechoslovakia (now Horní Jiřetín, Czech Republic)
- Party: Greens
- Other political affiliations: ODS (1998–2002); KDU-ČSL (2002)

Vladimír Buřt (3 March 1964, Albrechtice) is a Czech politician and environmentalist, and mayor of the town of Horní Jiřetín.

== Career ==
He is one of the most prominent advocates of the brown coal mining limits in North Bohemia as Horní Jiřetín is threatened with demolition by mining operations at the nearby Czechoslovak Army Mine. He has been a member of the Horní Jiřetín council since 1998, but also runs a small construction business specialising in the reconstruction of historic buildings.

He was the recipient of the 2009 Josef Vavroušek Prize for his persistent defence of local communities against the private interests of mining companies. Buřt was also awarded the Ivan Dejmal Prize in 2011 for an outstanding positive achievement associated with the landscape by the Society for Landscape.

Buřt is one of the main protagonists in the 2005 documentary, God's Stone Quarry (Czech: Kamenolom Boží), by director Břetislav Rychlík about the life of people living in the vicinity of the lunarscape creating by brown coal mining in North Bohemia. The documentary concludes with Buřt's assessment of what 'demons' the inhabitants of North Bohemian coal mining areas are forced to live with, which in his view is 'materialism'. "Materialism led to the rapid construction of uniform paneláks and environmental destruction, and in the post-communist period, it has led to envy. Buřt warns that it threatens to destroy more and that it will eventually result in destruction and the end of humanity."

He also briefly appears in another documentary about the lives of two women from opposing sides of the debate about coal mining in North Bohemia, called "Coal in the Soul" (Czech Ženy SHR), one of whom is his partner, Hana Krejčová, who is the custodian of Jezeří Castle situated on the slopes of the Ore Mountains overlooking the Czechoslovak Army Mine and which is also threatened by encroaching mining operations.

In the 2012 regional elections, Buřt won a seat on the Ústí regional council as a member of the Green Party (Czech Republic) on the Hnutí PRO kraj ticket – a coalition of the Green Party, the Christian and Democratic Union – Czechoslovak People's Party (Czech: Křesťanská a demokratická unie – Československá strana lidová, KDU–ČSL) and the Movement of Independents’ Harmonious Development of Communities and Towns (Czech: Hnutí nezávislých za harmonický rozvoj obcí or HNHRM). Hnutí PRO kraj won 8.1% of the vote in the Ústí region while Buřt himself received a total of 1462 votes, which placed him third out of the six candidates who were elected on the PRO kraj ticket.

Buřt was listed No. 15 on the Ústí region's Green Party ticket for the 2013 parliamentary elections, while Hana Krejčová appeared at no.8 on the same ticket. The Green Party won 3.19% of the national vote in the elections, i.e. not enough to surpass the 5% threshold to enter parliament. In the Ústí region itself, it won 2.68% of the vote. In Horní Jiřetín, the Green Party won 15.95% of the votes cast, which was the third best party performance behind ANO 2011 and the Communist Party of Bohemia and Moravia.

In the October 2014 municipal elections, Buřt was the highest polling candidate in Horní Jiřetín with 454 votes. He stood on the Association of Green Parties and Independent Candidates ticket (Czech: Sdružení Strany zelených a nezávislých kandidátů), which returned four representatives to the town council with 27.5% of the total vote. As a result, he became mayor of the town.
