= Zuzana Tvarůžková =

Czech television presenter

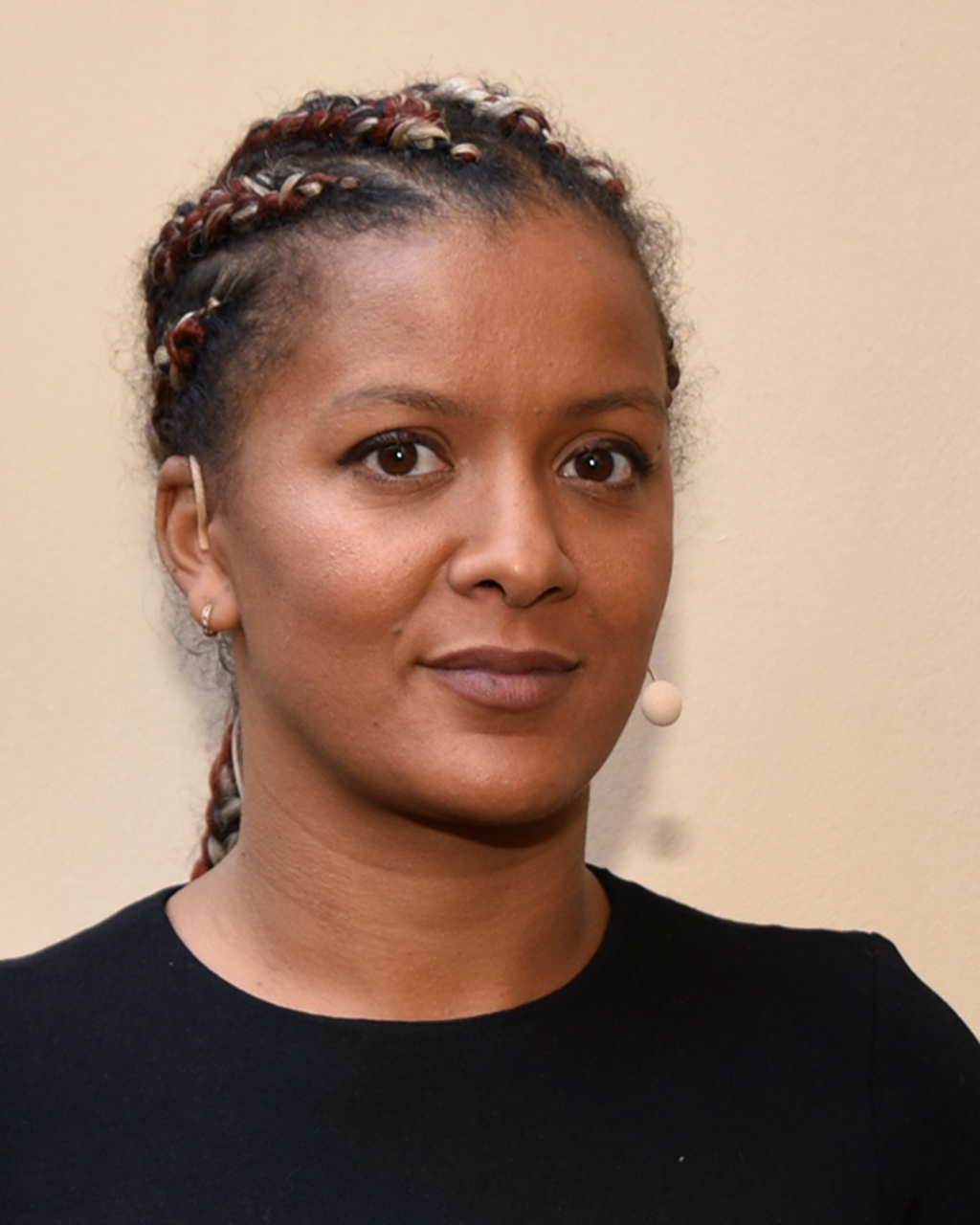
- Zuzana Tvarůžková (2024)
- Born: Zuzana Tvarůžková; 26 June 1983 (age 42); Litvínov, Czechoslovakia (now Czech Republic)
- Citizenship: Czech
- Occupation: TV presenter
- Years active: 2003–present
- Television: Česká televize (ČT)
- Relatives: Lucie Tvarůžková (sister); Ladislav Tvarůžek (brother)

Zuzana Tvarůžková (born 26 June 1983 in Litvínov) is a Czech television presenter, who works for the news server Aktuálně.cz. She previously worked for television channel Česká televize (ČT). Tvarůžková started presenting the programme Interview ČT24 in 2014, together with colleague Daniel Takáč.

In September–October 2014, together with colleague Václav Moravec, she moderated the pre-election debates of ČT before the 2014 municipal elections.

== Personal life ==
Tvarůžková was born in Litvínov and her parents are Czechs. However, her biological father is a Cuban who worked in a Litvínov petrochemical plant. Shortly after Tvarůžková's mother became pregnant with him, he had to return to Havana. She was raised by her mother and her husband Ladislav Tvarůžek. She contacted her biological father only in adulthood via the social network Facebook.

Tvarůžková has two siblings, older sister Lucie and younger brother Ladislav.
