= Horní Jiřetín =

- Town
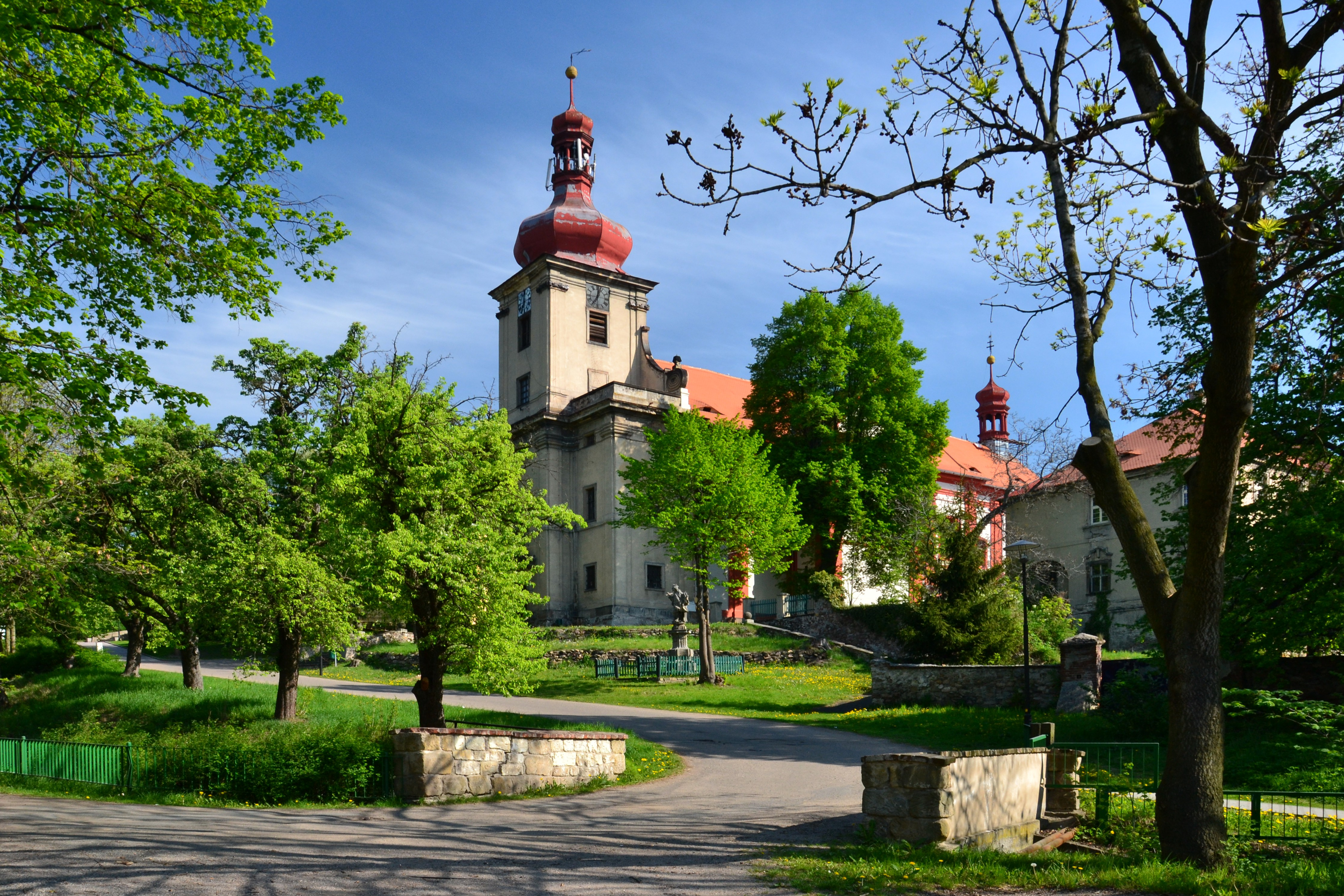
- Church of the Assumption of the Virgin Mary

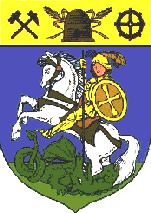
- Flag Coat of arms

- Location in the Czech Republic
- Coordinates: 50°34′30″N 13°32′43″E
- Country: Czech Republic
- Region: Ústí nad Labem
- District: Most
- First mentioned: 1263

Government
  - Mayor: Vladimír Buřt (Green Party)

Area
  - Total: 39.86 km^{2} (15.39 sq mi)
- Elevation: 280 m (920 ft)

Population (2026-01-01)
  - Total: 2,153
  - Density: 54.01/km^{2} (139.9/sq mi)
- Time zone: UTC+1 (CET)
  - Summer (DST): UTC+2 (CEST)
- Postal code: 435 43
- Website: www.hornijiretin.cz

Horní Jiřetín (Czech pronunciation: [ˈɦorɲiː ˈjɪr̝ɛciːn]; German: Obergeorgenthal) is a town in Most District in the Ústí nad Labem Region of the Czech Republic. It has about 2,200 inhabitants. The town is located on the Loupnice Stream on the border between the Most Basin and Ore Mountains, in an area known for lignite mining. The main architectural landmark of Horní Jiřetín is the Jezeří Castle, protected as a national cultural monument.

== Administrative division ==
Horní Jiřetín consists of five municipal parts (in brackets population according to the 2021 census):

- Horní Jiřetín (1,800)
- Černice (232)
- Dolní Jiřetín (11)
- Jezeří (0)
- Mariánské Údolí (47)

== Etymology ==
The initial name of the settlement was Juřetín. The name was derived from the personal name Jurata (a variant of Jiří), meaning "Jurata's (court)". The German name Georgenthal was derived from the Czech name and meant "George's valley".

== Geography ==
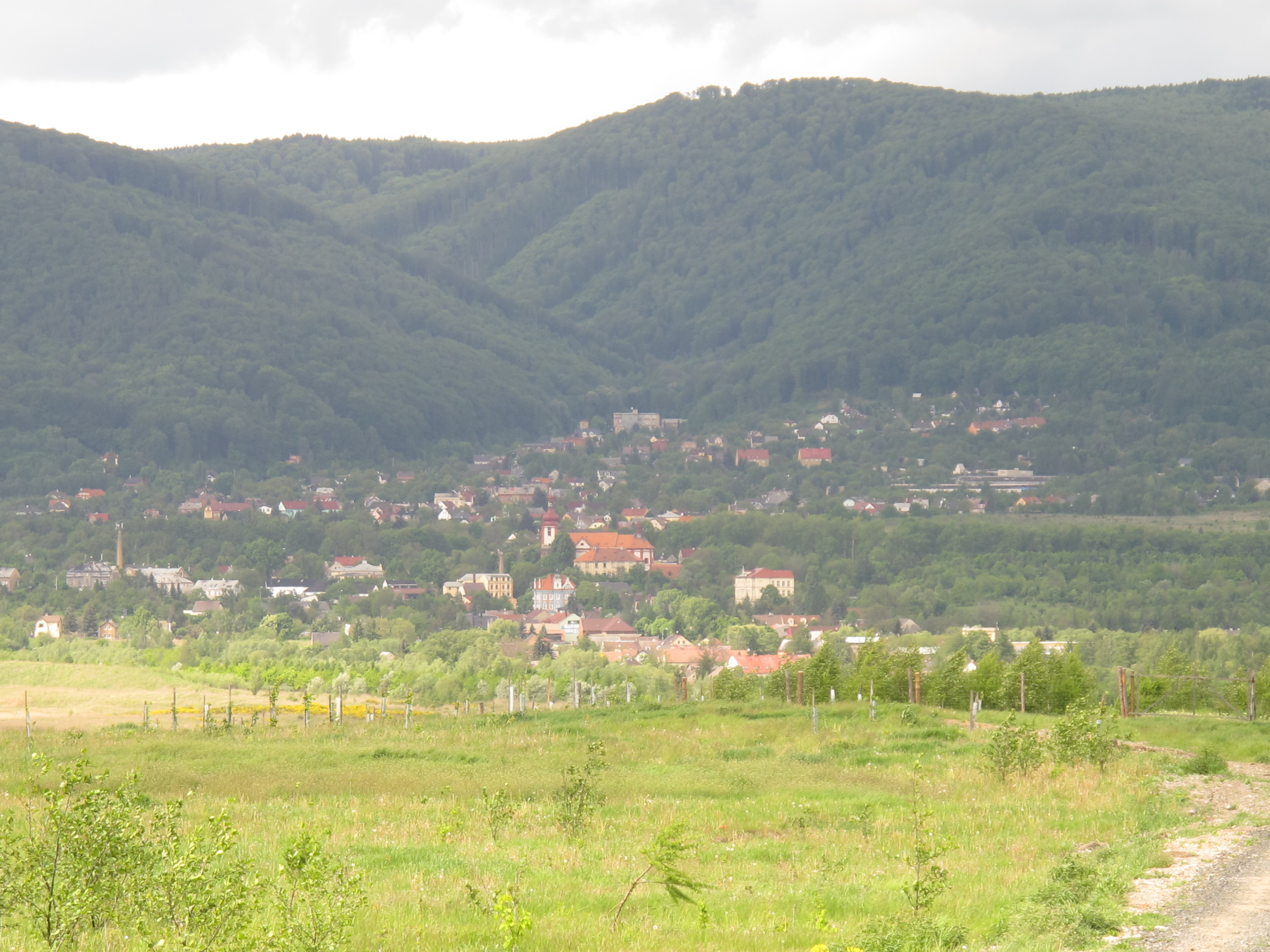
Horní Jiřetín with the Ore Mountains

Horní Jiřetín is located about 9 kilometres (6 mi) northwest of Most and 35 km (22 mi) west of Ústí nad Labem. It lies on the border between the Most Basin and Ore Mountains. The highest point is a mountain at 852 m (2,795 ft) above sea level. The Loupnice Stream flows though the town. There are several fishponds and artificial lakes in the municipal territory.

== History ==
The first written mention of Horní Jiřetín is from 1263, when the name was written as Jorenthal. In 1409, Jiřetín was divided into Horní ('upper') and Dolní ('lower') Jiřetín. During the 17th century, Horní Jiřetín was affected by the Thirty Years' War and by the great plague epidemic in 1680. From the 17th century, Horní Jiřetín, divided by the stream Jiřetínský potok, was mainly governed by the Lobkowicz and Waldstein families.

From 1938 to 1945, the municipality was annexed by Nazi Germany and administered as part of the Reichsgau Sudetenland. After World War II, most of the German population was expelled and replaced by Czechs.

== Demographics ==
Historical population

Year	Pop.	±%
1869	3,051	—
1880	3,582	+17.4%
1890	5,809	+62.2%
1900	8,048	+38.5%
1910	8,423	+4.7%

Year	Pop.	±%
1921	8,206	−2.6%
1930	9,079	+10.6%
1950	7,436	−18.1%
1961	6,627	−10.9%
1970	5,333	−19.5%

Year	Pop.	±%
1980	3,612	−32.3%
1991	1,861	−48.5%
2001	1,917	+3.0%
2011	2,041	+6.5%
2021	2,090	+2.4%

Source: Censuses

== Economy ==
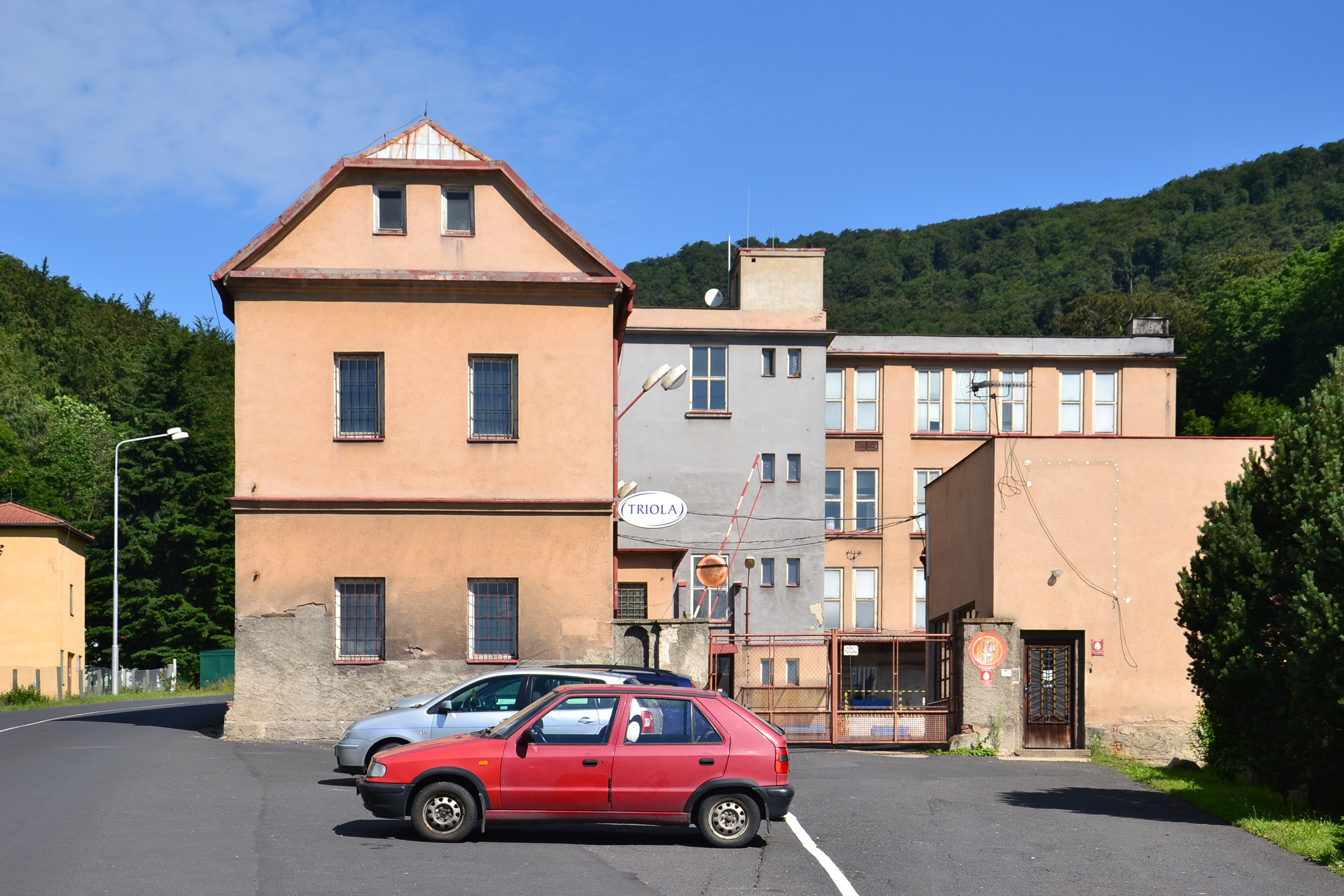
Triola factory

In the past, the inhabitants of Jiřetín subsisted mainly on fishing in Lake Komořany, ore mining and various forms of agriculture, mainly arboriculture. Lignite has been continuously mined in Horní Jiřetín since the middle of the 19th century. Today, a significant part of the municipal territory is occupied by a lignite surface mine, Lom ČSA. In 2015, the Ministry of Industry proposed breaking the mining limits imposed on the mine. This would lead to the demolition of 170 houses in Horní Jiřetín. However, the proposal specifically for this mine was not accepted.

In 1828, a cotton plant was built in Mariánské Údolí. It is still in operation today as the Triola company and it manufactures underwear and swimwear.

== Transport ==
The I/27 road (the section from Most to Litvínov) runs along the eastern municipal border.

== Sights ==
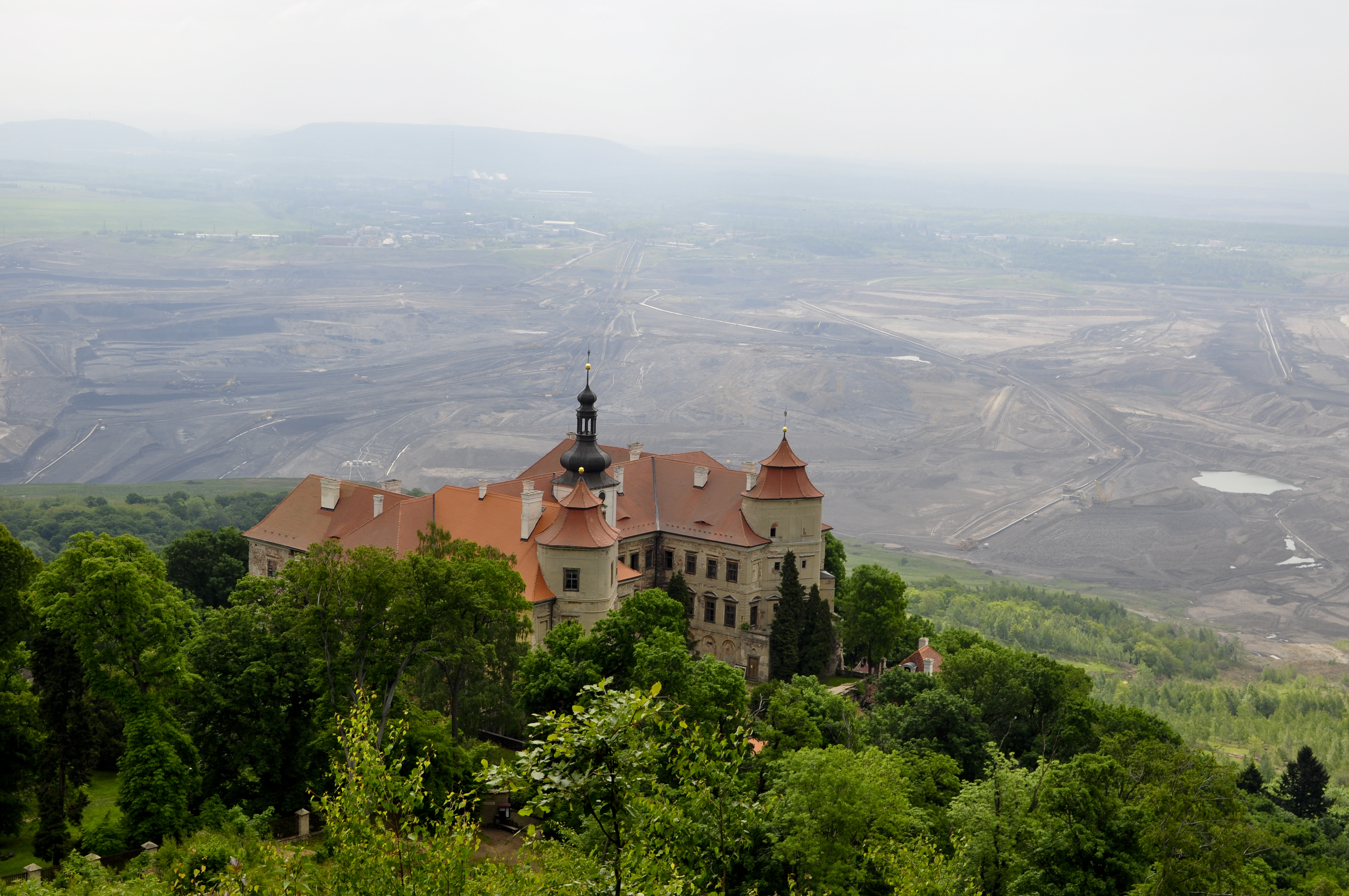
Jezeří Castle with the lignite mine

The most important architectural monument is the Jezeří Castle incorporated into the slopes of the Ore Mountains. It was originally a Gothic castle from the 14th century, later rebuilt in the Renaissance and then in the Baroque style. Most of its English-style park was destroyed by coal mining. Since 2023, it has been protected as a national cultural monument.

In Horní Jiřetín is the valuable Church of the Assumption of the Virgin Mary. It was built in the early Baroque style in 1694–1700 according to design of the architect Jean Baptiste Mathey.

== Notable people ==
- Franz Joseph Glæser (1798–1861), Czech-Danish composer
- Vladimír Sommer (1921–1997), composer
- Walter Womacka (1925–2010), German artist
- Vladimír Buřt (born 1964), ecologist, mayor of the town

== Twin towns – sister cities ==
Horní Jiřetín is twinned with:

- Battenberg, Germany
