= Lom ČSA =

Czechoslovak Army Mine
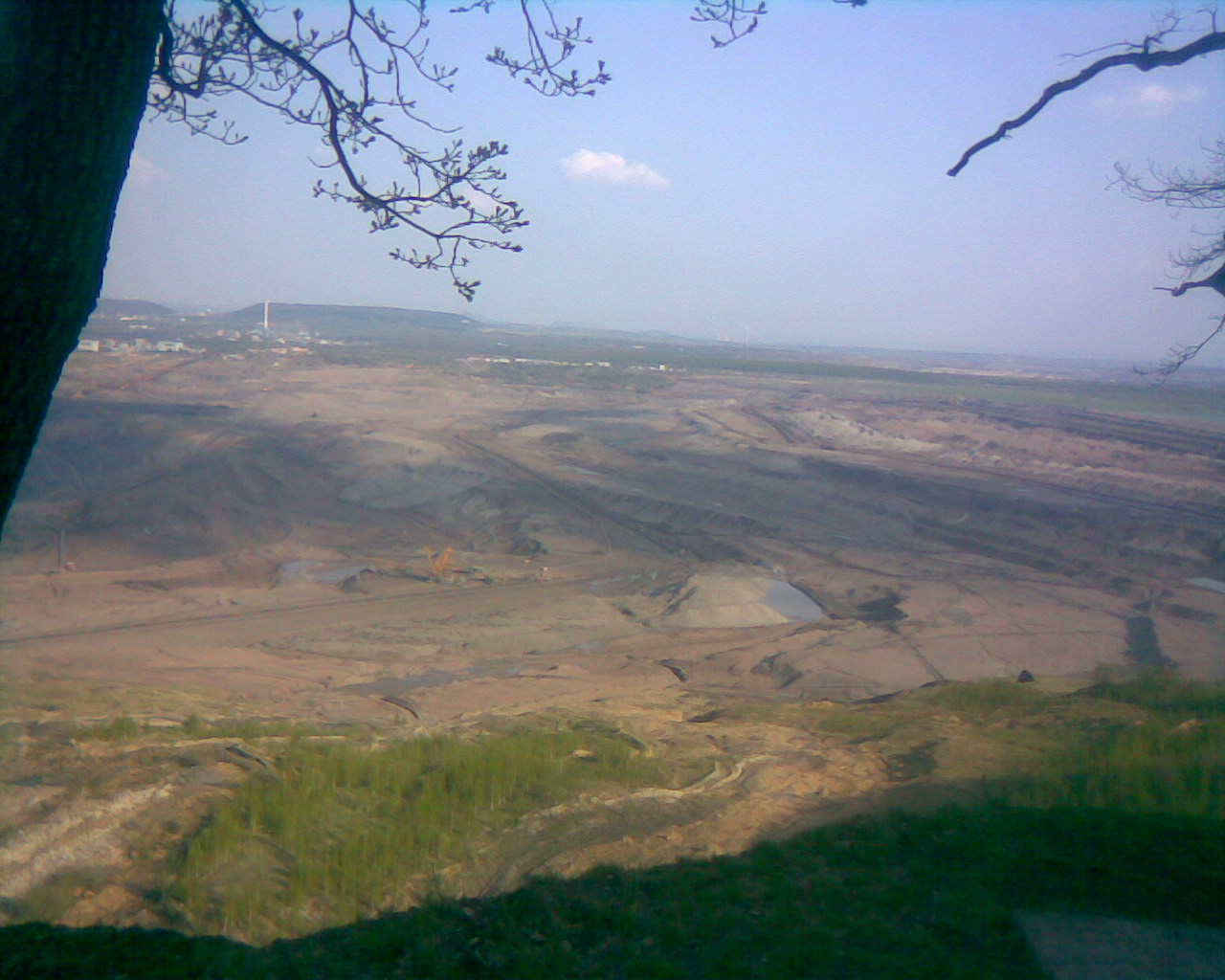

- Location within Czech Republic
- Location: Most Basin, Czech Republic; 50°32′30″N 13°31′38″E
- Products: Lignite
- Company: Czech Coal Group

The Czechoslovak Army Mine (Czech: Lom Československé armády, shortened to Lom ČSA) is an opencast lignite mine located in the Most Basin of the Czech Republic, located between the city of Most and the town of Litvínov. Since 2008, mining operations have been run by Litvínovská uhelná a.s. after its owner, the Czech Coal Group, broke up the former mining company, Mostecká uhelná a.s., into two operations (the other company is Vršanská uhelná a.s.).

== History ==
The ČSA mine is located on the site of what was once Lake Komořany, created approximately 15,000 years ago at the end of the Pleistocene era as a shallow flow-through lake fed and drained by the river Bílina. Originally occupying an area of nearly 5,600 ha at the foot of the Ore Mountains and under the gaze of Jezeří Castle, it was the biggest lake in the Kingdom of Bohemia.

Due to the requirements of the mining industry, and partially for health reasons, Lake Komořany was artificially drained at the behest of Prince Ferdinand Lobkowitz from 1831. A part of the Lake remained extant until the 20th century, but all remains have long since disappeared as a result of encroaching mining operations. Today's ČSA mine first begin coal extraction activities in 1901 under the name Hedvika, the volume of coal mined increasing from 74,000 tonnes in 1902 to 344,000 tonnes in 1910. The mine supplied coal to the Ervěnická power station which powered the city of Prague and its surrounds from 1926. Hedvika was one of the first coal mines in Czechoslovakia to begin production again after the Second World War and was renamed the President Roosevelt Mine in 1947. It was transformed from a small-scale mine to a large-scale operation in the 1950s due to a general lack of coal nationwide. It was renamed the Czechoslovak Army Mine in 1958, and in 1962 it was incorporated into the V. I. Lenin Mines national enterprise. It finally became part of the 100% state-owned post-revolution Mostecká uhelná společnost [Most Mining Company] in 1993 before that company was privatised in 1999.

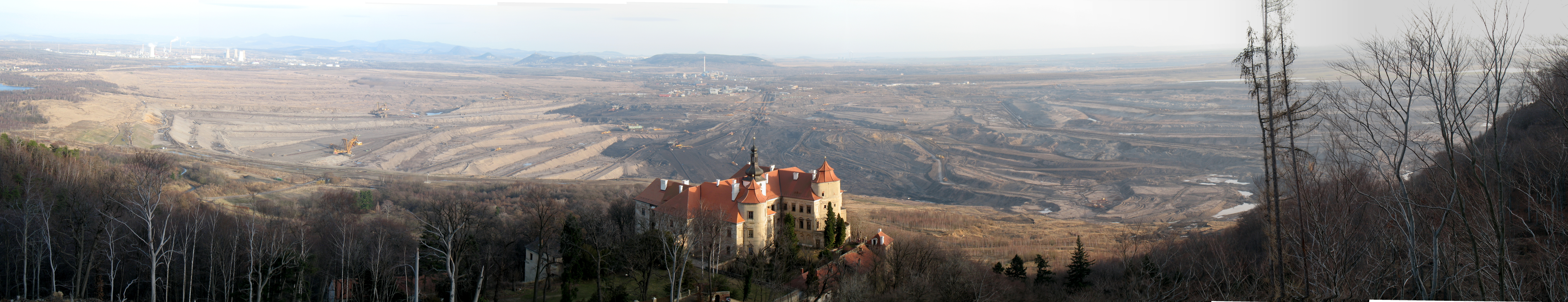
Mining operations viewed from Jezeří Castle

== Mining limits ==
The ČSA mine is subject to the brown coal mining limits in North Bohemia imposed by the Czech government in 1991. Without the limits, the mine would continue operations in various stages for well over another one hundred years until approximately 2133. In the next stage of mining, 287 million tonnes of coal would be extracted from the area beneath the towns of Černice and Horní Jiřetín and as far as the city limits of Litvínov, while the third and fourth stages would encompass the area under CheZa - Chemické závody or the large chemical plant in Záluží u Litvínova which houses Czech oil refinery operations – and terminate close to the city of Most. Coal extraction at the ČSA mine started to be curtained in 2012, as coal deposits within the current limits are due to be exhausted sometime between 2017 and 2022. In November 2012, the first of three overburden excavators was shut down. Production at the ČSA mine fell in 2011 from 4.6 to 4.1 million tons, and in 2013 it will fall further to 2.5 million tons.

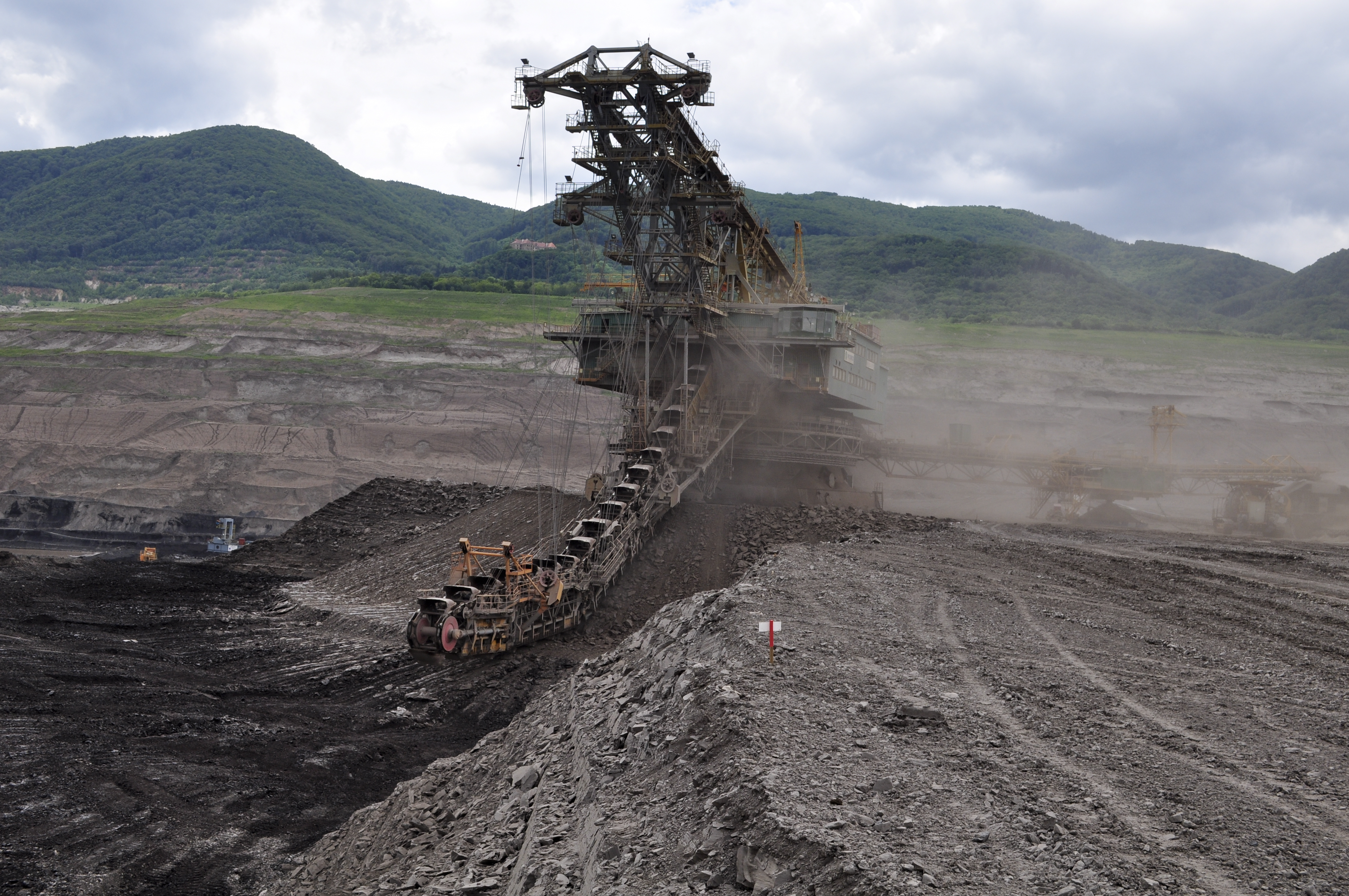
Excavator at ČSA mine

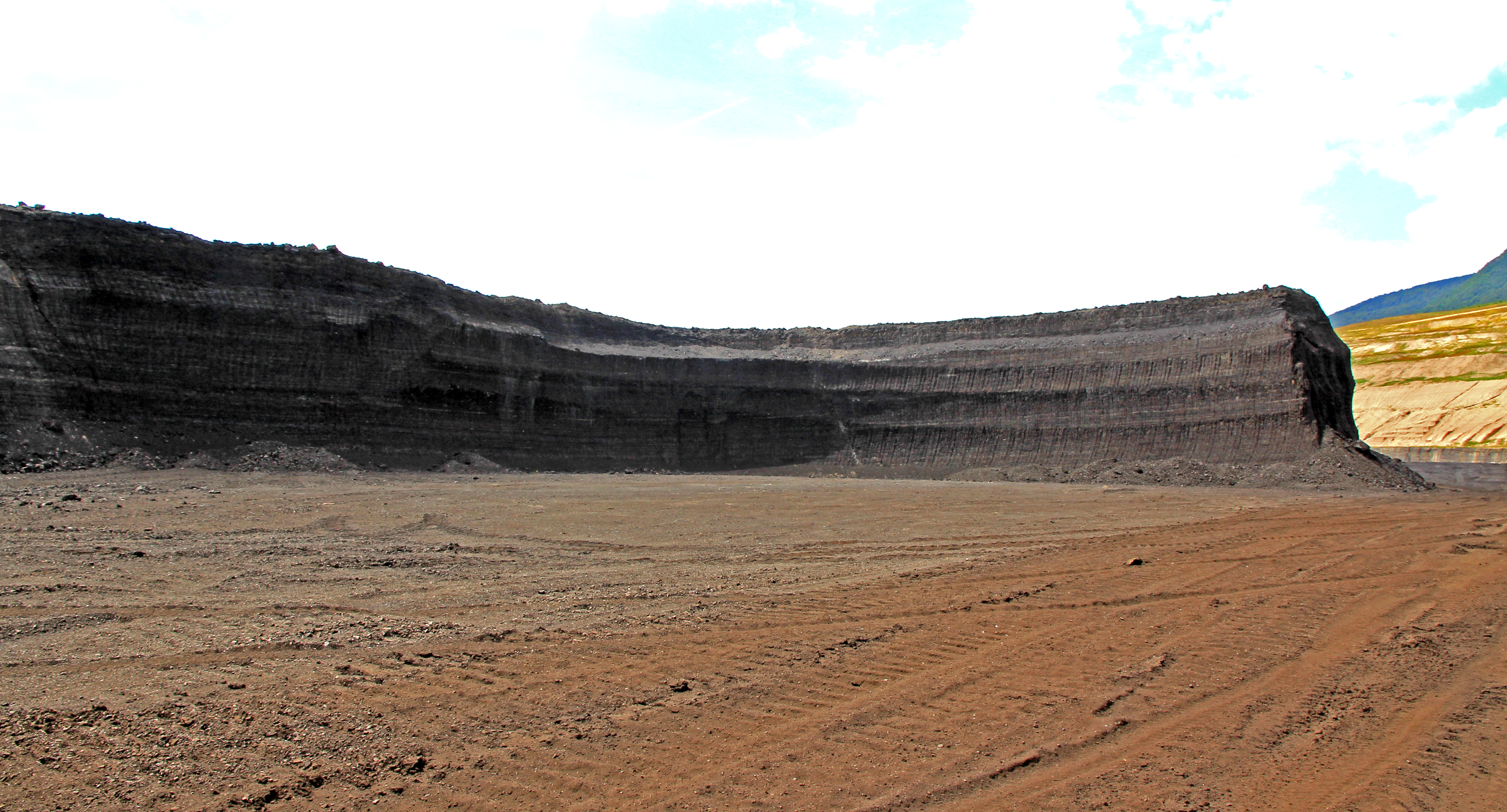
Layer of lignite before mining

== Reserves ==
According to Czech Coal, there are 41.6 million tonnes of high-grade lignite with a calorific value of 17.5MJ/kg within the current mining limits, and a further 750 million tonnes located outside the limits with allegedly the highest calorific value in the Czech Republic.

== Recultivation ==
The future plan is for the area around the ČSA mine to become a lake again with a surface area of 1000.8 ha, a depth of up to 140m and a volume of about 692 million m3. It would eventually become one of six artificial lakes in greater mining region as a result of recultivation activities. In May 2024, the cessation of mining at the quarry and the layoff of all employees was announced. Coal mining was eventually stopped. Remedial coal mining will end by 2027. The restoration of the area is to be completed by 2032 and a lake will be created on the site.

== See also ==
- Energy in the Czech Republic
