= Lake Komořany =

- Komořanské jezero (Czech)
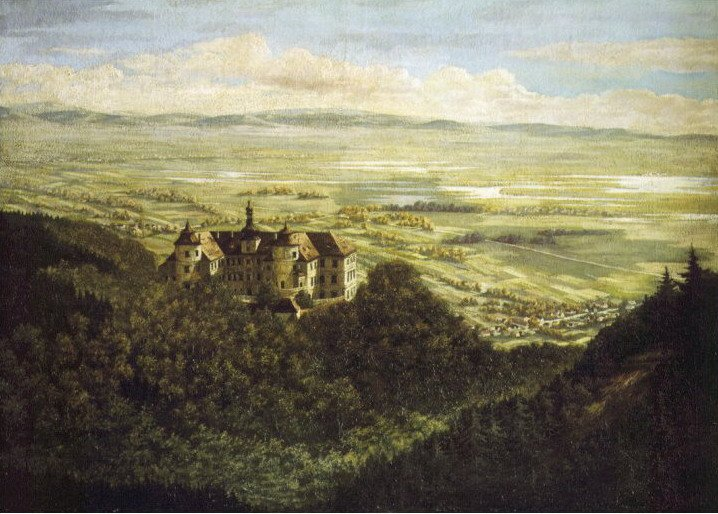
- Lake Komořany, picture from 1882

- Location within Czech Republic
- Location: Czech Republic
- Coordinates: 50°32′30″N 13°32′27″E
- Primary outflows: Bílina
- Surface area: 1.95 square kilometres (0.75 sq mi)

Lake Komořany (Czech: Komořanské jezero) is a former lake in the Czech Republic that is now non-existent as it has dried up. It had an area of approximately 140 hectares (350 acres). It was located in the Ore Mountains in the northwestern part of the country, near the Jezeří Castle. The lake was shallow and open. It was formed approximately 15 thousand years ago. It reached an area of up to 56 km^{2}. Over time, it shrank to 1.95 km^{2} in the 19th century. On historical maps (e.g. the 1st military mapping of the Austrian Empire) it is present as a discontinuous water area with numerous islands and wetlands. The lake gradually shrank due to the increase in sediments that filled its sources. The Bílina flowed out of it, which is now being diverted into a pipeline due to open-pit mining in the area.

It was completely drained by order of Prince Ferdinand Joseph von Lobkowicz after 1831. Currently, the Czechoslovak Army Mine occupies the site of the former lake. Coal mining was eventually stopped. Remedial coal mining will end by 2027. The restoration of the area is to be completed by 2032 and a lake will be created on the site.
