= Litvínov =

- Town
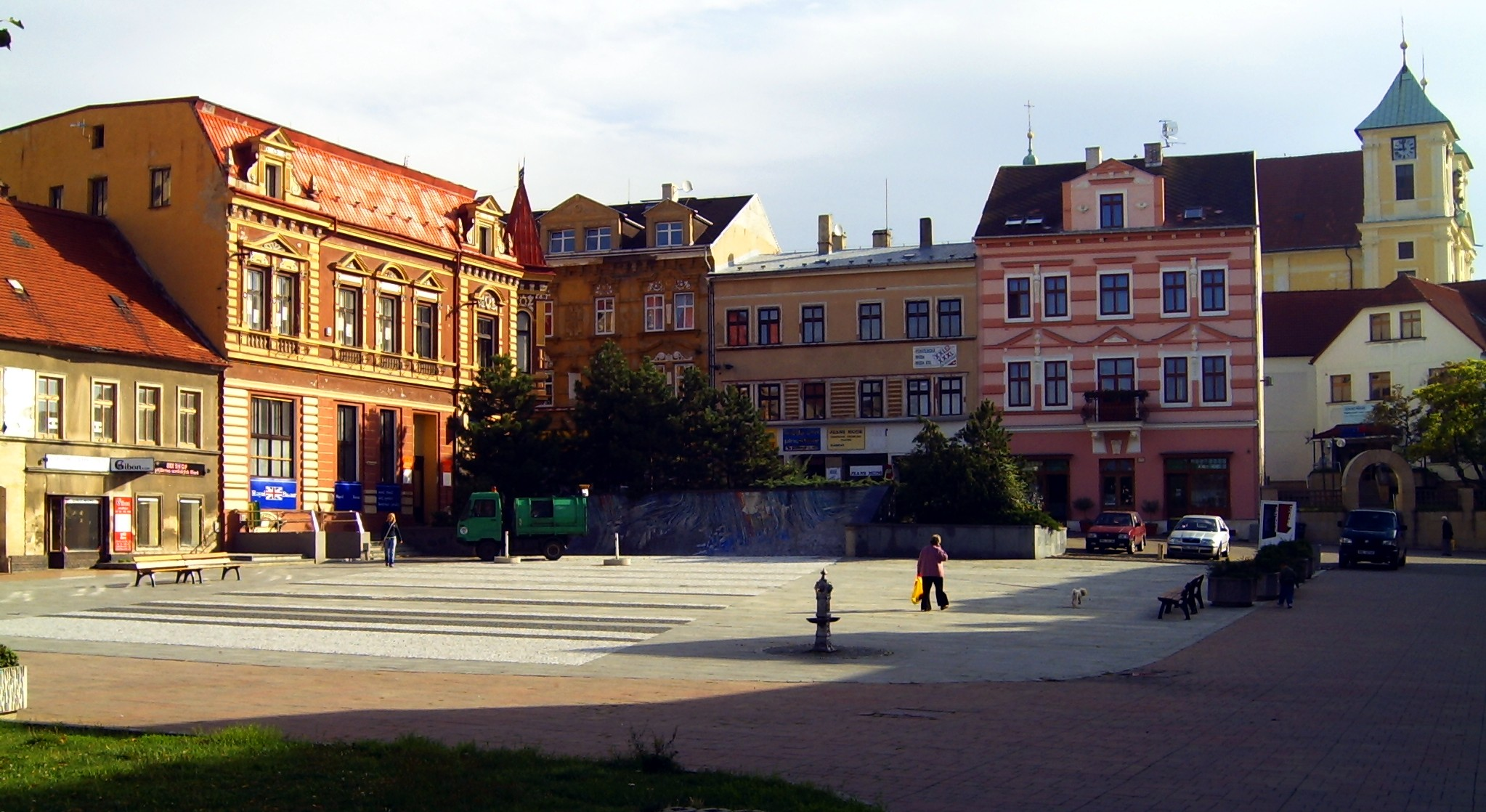
- The square Náměstí Míru

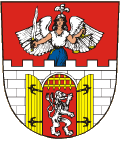
- Flag Coat of arms

- Location in the Czech Republic
- Coordinates: 50°36′3″N 13°36′40″E
- Country: Czech Republic
- Region: Ústí nad Labem
- District: Most
- First mentioned: 1352

Government
  - Mayor: Kamila Bláhová (ANO)

Area
  - Total: 40.70 km^{2} (15.71 sq mi)
- Elevation: 338 m (1,109 ft)

Population (2026-01-01)
  - Total: 22,258
  - Density: 546.9/km^{2} (1,416/sq mi)
- Time zone: UTC+1 (CET)
  - Summer (DST): UTC+2 (CEST)
- Postal code: 436 01
- Website: www.mulitvinov.cz

Litvínov (Czech pronunciation: [ˈlɪtviːnof]; German: Leutensdorf) is a town in Most District in the Ústí nad Labem Region of the Czech Republic. It has about 22,000 inhabitants. The town is located on the border between the Most Basin and Ore Mountains. It is an industrial town, known for the largest oil refinery in the country.

Litvínov was founded in the 14th century at the latest and became a town in 1852. The most important monument is the Church of Saint Michael from the 17th century.

== Administrative division ==
Litvínov consists of 12 municipal parts (in brackets population according to the 2021 census):

- Dolní Litvínov (43)
- Horní Litvínov (15,058)
- Chudeřín (1,356)
- Hamr (1,867)
- Horní Ves (22)
- Janov (3,795)
- Křížatky (47)
- Lounice (25)
- Písečná (16)
- Růžodol (0)
- Šumná (148)
- Záluží (11)

== Etymology ==
The initial name of the settlement was Lutvínov (in old Czech written as Lutwinow). It was derived from the personal name Lutvín, meaning "Lutvín's (court)". The German name Liutwin, from which the name Lutvín was derived, is made up of Old High German words liut ('people') and wini ('friend').

== Geography ==
Litvínov is located about 10 kilometres (6 mi) north of Most and 30 km (19 mi) west of Ústí nad Labem. The southern part of the municipal territory with the town proper lies in the Most Basin and the northern part lies in the Ore Mountains. The highest point is a nameless hill at 760 m (2,493 ft) above sea level.

== History ==
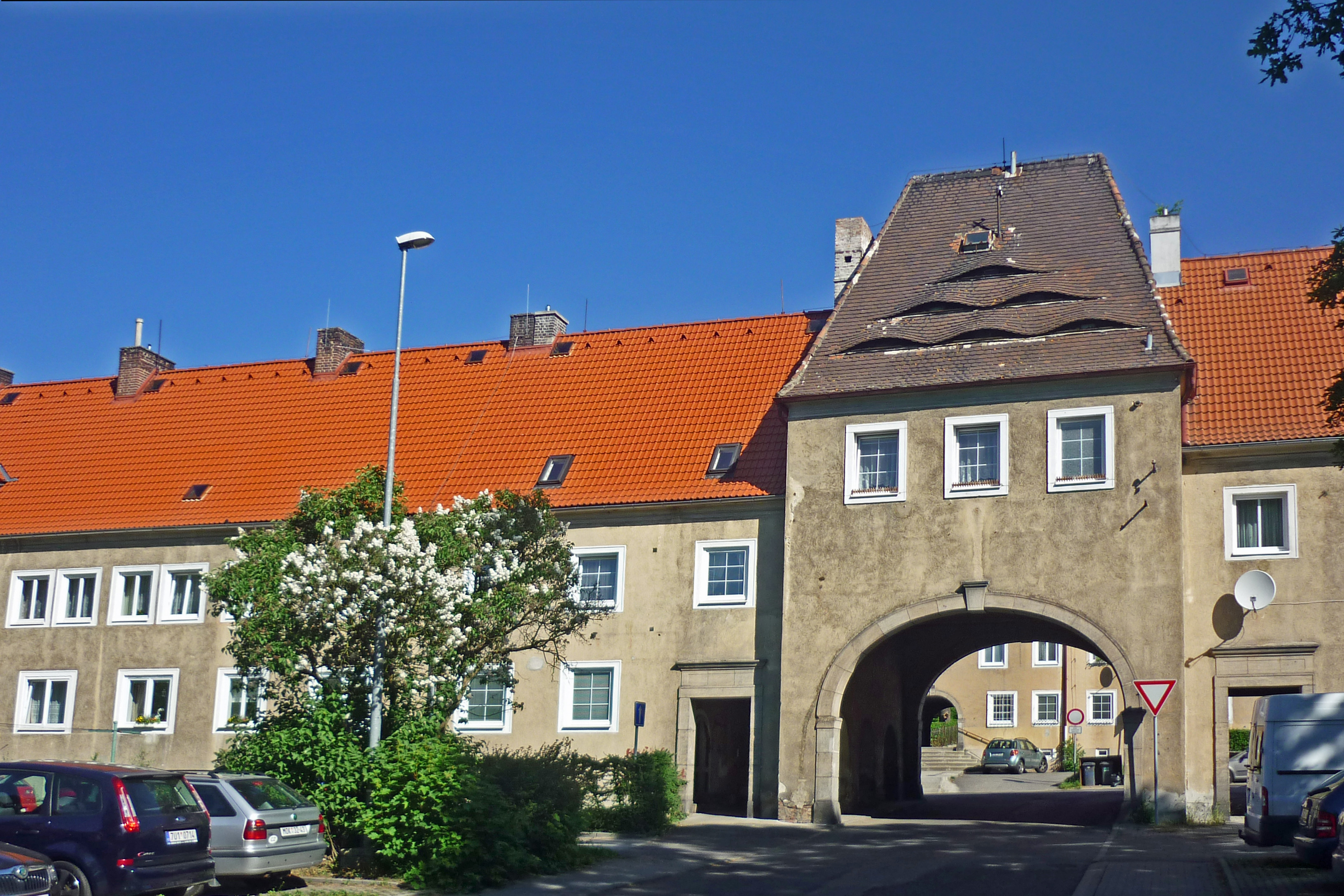
Osada, a locality of Horní Litvínov

The first written mention is from 1352. Originally there were two settlements – Horní Litvínov and Dolní Litvínov. In 1715, Count Johann Josef von Waldstein, a member of the Waldstein family, founded a large cloth factory, which was one of the first in the Czech lands.

Litvínov was promoted to a town on 5 October 1852. In the 19th century, the industrialisation of Litvínov deepened. Many new factories were established. Toys and wooden goods were made here, cotton was processed. The mining of lignite, which persists to this day, began, and after a new part of the railway was put into operation in 1870, other coal mines were opened. In a short time, a total of 19 mines were built. Employment opportunities attracted many new residents.

As a result of the global economic crisis in the 1930s, the largely industrial Litvínov was also severely affected. Production was limited in factories or was completely stopped, and the mines were also affected.

In 1939, a large oil refinery was founded south of the town.

== Demographics ==
Historical population

Year	Pop.	±%
1869	6,342	—
1880	7,414	+16.9%
1890	10,707	+44.4%
1900	20,473	+91.2%
1910	24,065	+17.5%

Year	Pop.	±%
1921	23,460	−2.5%
1930	24,136	+2.9%
1950	25,527	+5.8%
1961	24,990	−2.1%
1970	26,842	+7.4%

Year	Pop.	±%
1980	29,551	+10.1%
1991	29,096	−1.5%
2001	27,397	−5.8%
2011	24,905	−9.1%
2021	22,388	−10.1%

Source: Censuses

== Economy ==
The largest oil refinery in the Czech Republic (owned by Orlen Unipetrol) is located there.

== Transport ==
In addition to buses, trams also provide public transport. The town operates a transport company together with the neighbouring city of Most.

The I/27 road (the section from Most to Dubí) runs through the town.

There are two train stations in Litvínov. The station named Litvínov is the terminus and start of a line to Ústí nad Labem. The station named Litvínov město is located on the line Rakovník–Osek.

== Sport ==
Lítvínov is a traditional centre of ice hockey. Local club HC Litvínov is a stable part of the top national league (Extraliga) since 1959. Many famous ice hockey players and coaches are connected with HC Litvínov, including 1998 Olympic gold medalists Ivan Hlinka, Vladimír Růžička, Jiří Šlégr, Robert Reichel and Martin Ručinský.

== Sights ==
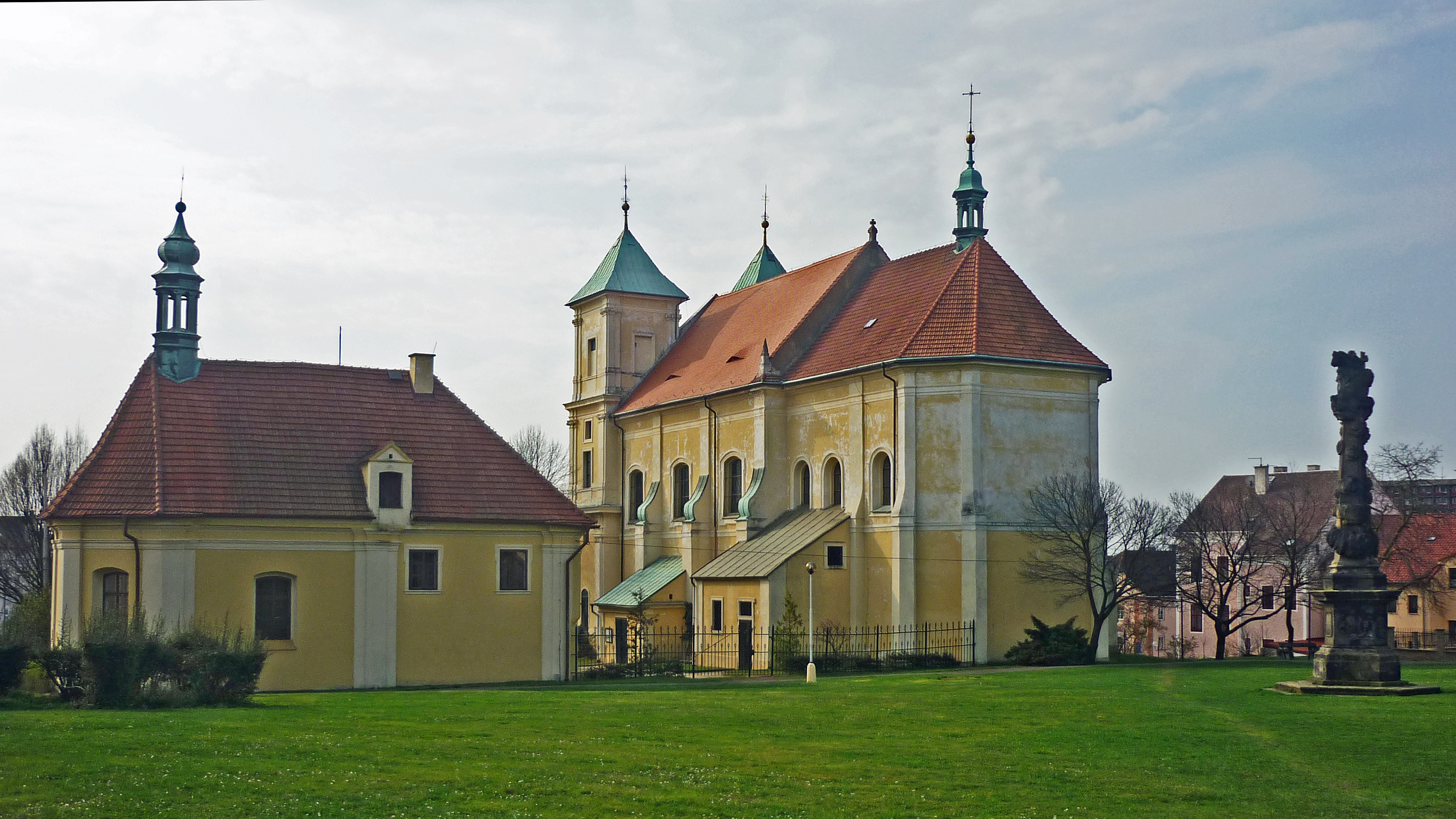
Church of Saint Michael

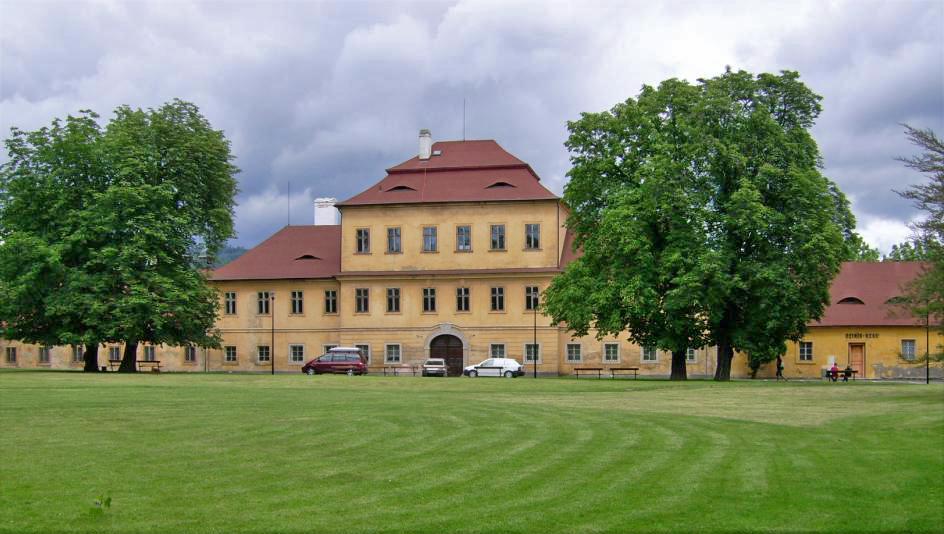
Castle in Litvínov

The Church of Saint Michael is the oldest and most important state-protected monument of Litvínov. It was built in 1685–1694 in the early Baroque style. The church has been renovated many times, for the first time in 1763. During the major renovation, which took place between 1887 and 1902, the interior was significantly beautified.

Valdštejn Castle (also called Litvínov Castle) serves today social and cultural purposes. It was rebuilt into the form of today's Baroque chateau in 1732–1743 by the architect František Maxmilián Kaňka. After the abolition of the castle garden, an English-style castle park with an area of 8 ha (20 acres) was established in 1878. From the end of the 19th century, the castle was used for economic purposes, and since 1964 a museum has been established here.

Osada, a locality in Horní Litvínov, is protected as an urban monument zone. It includes a well-preserved uniform and high-quality urban area with apartment buildings, which were built by the occupation authorities during World War II for employees of the chemical factory in Záluží.

== Notable people ==
- Květoslav Minařík (1908–1974), yogi and mystic
- Milan Šťovíček (born 1958), politician, mayor of Litvínov in 2006–2009 and 2010–2014
- Josef Beránek (born 1969), ice hockey player and coach
- Robert Reichel (born 1971), ice hockey player
- Eva Herzigová (born 1973), model
- Iva Frühlingová (born 1982), singer and model
- Zuzana Tvarůžková (born 1983), TV presenter
- Jakub Petružálek (born 1985), ice hockey player

== Twin towns – sister cities ==
Litvínov is twinned with:

- Brie-Comte-Robert, France
- Olbernhau, Germany
