= Týniště =

Týniště may refer to places in the Czech Republic:

- Týniště (Plzeň-South District), a municipality and village in the Plzeň Region
- Týniště nad Orlicí, a town in the Hradec Králové Region
- Týniště, a village and part of Malešov in the Central Bohemian Region
- Týniště, a village and part of Verušičky in the Karlovy Vary Region
- Týniště, a village and part of Zubrnice in the Ústí nad Labem Region
