= Ústí nad Labem District =

Ústí nad Labem District Okres Ústí nad Labem
- District
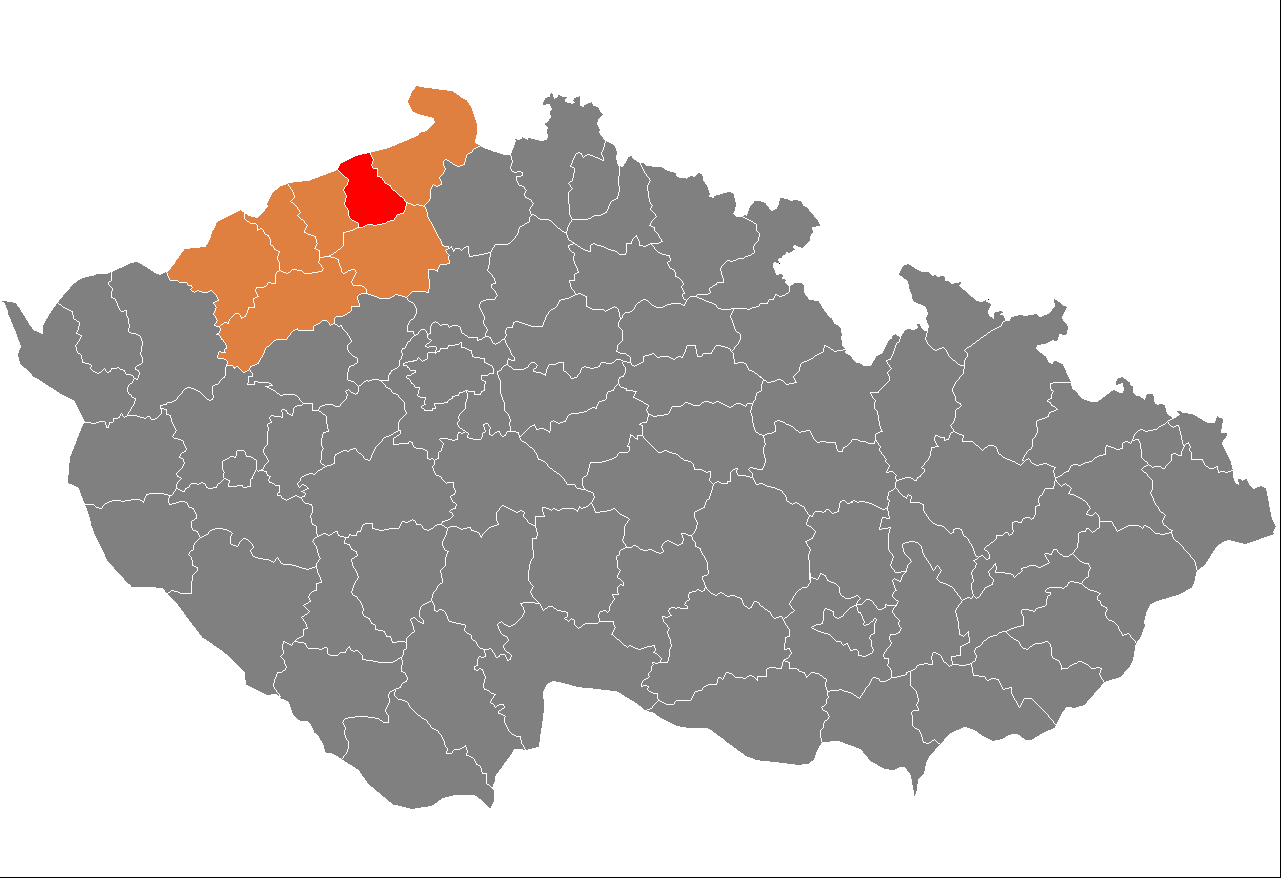
- Location in the Ústí nad Labem Region within the Czech Republic

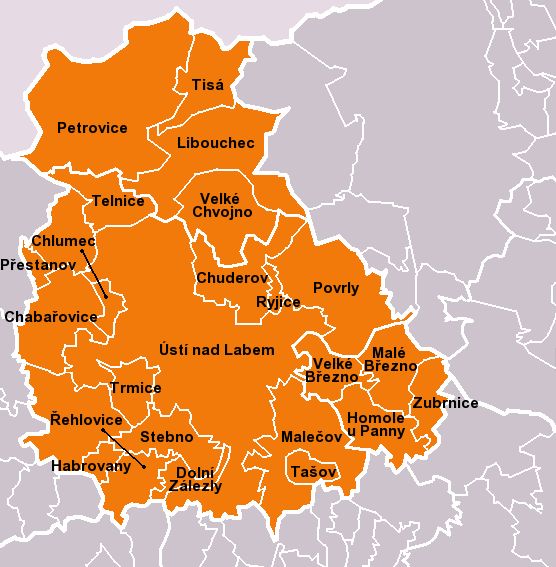
- Coordinates: 50°41′N 14°3′E
- Country: Czech Republic
- Region: Ústí nad Labem
- Capital: Ústí nad Labem

Area
  - Total: 404.75 km^{2} (156.27 sq mi)

Population (2026)
  - Total: 117,249
  - Density: 289.68/km^{2} (750.27/sq mi)
- Time zone: UTC+1 (CET)
  - Summer (DST): UTC+2 (CEST)
- Municipalities: 23
- * Cities and towns: 4
- * Market towns: 0

Ústí nad Labem District (Czech: okres Ústí nad Labem) is a district in the Ústí nad Labem Region of the Czech Republic. Its capital is the city of Ústí nad Labem.

== Administrative division ==
Ústí nad Labem District is formed by only one administrative district of municipality with extended competence: Ústí nad Labem.

=== List of municipalities ===
Cities and towns are marked in bold:

Chabařovice - Chlumec - Chuderov - Dolní Zálezly - Habrovany - Homole u Panny - Libouchec - Malé Březno - Malečov - Petrovice - Povrly - Přestanov - Řehlovice - Ryjice - Stebno - Tašov - Telnice - Tisá - Trmice - Ústí nad Labem - Velké Březno - Velké Chvojno - Zubrnice

== Geography ==
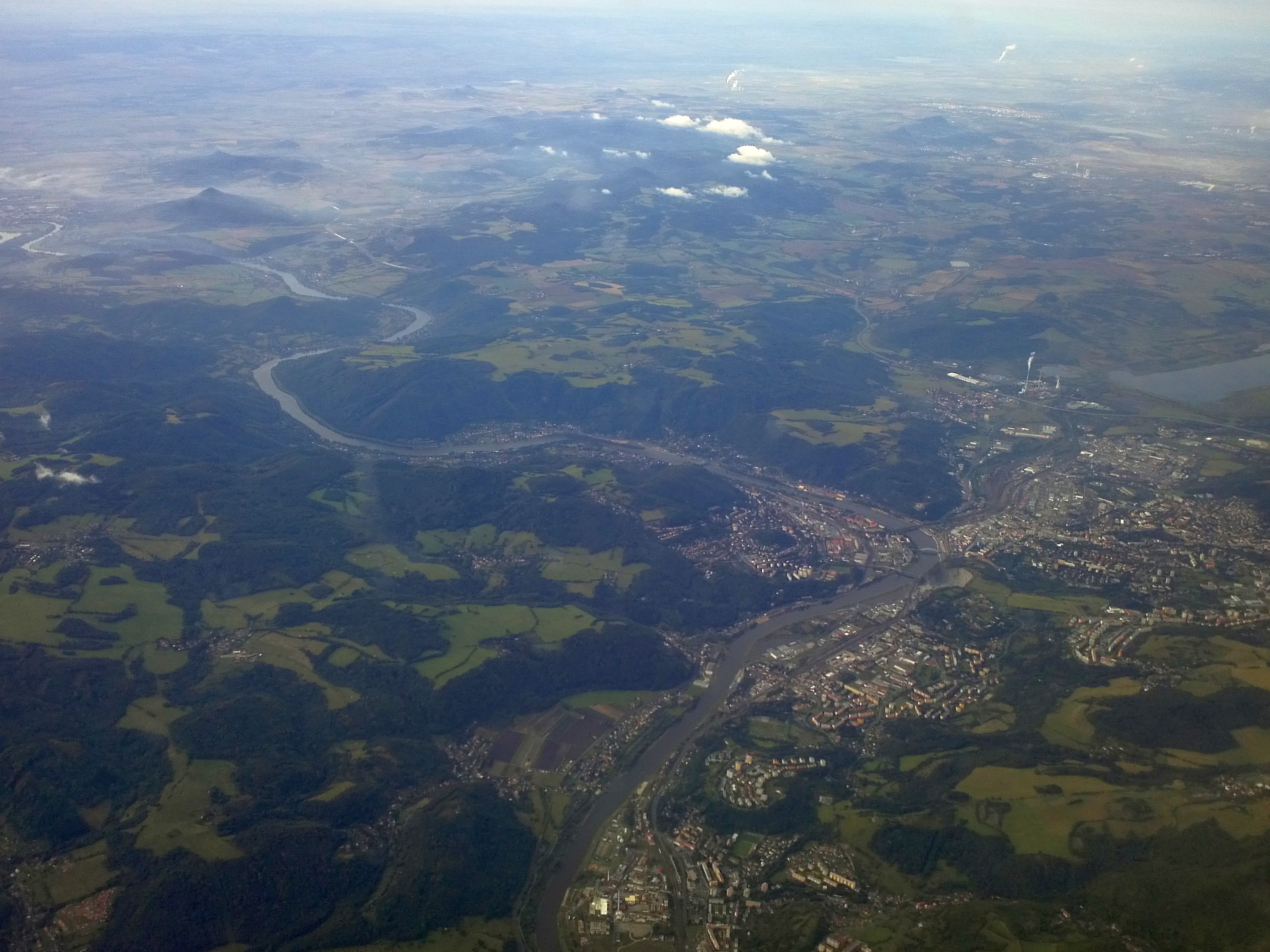
Aerial view of Ústí nad Labem

Ústí nad Labem District borders Germany in the north. The terrain is very varied—mostly hilly except in the west, and divided by the Elbe river valley. The territory extends into four geomorphological mesoregions: Central Bohemian Uplands (most of the territory), Most Basin (west), Ore Mountains (north) and Elbe Sandstone Mountains (a small part in the northeast with the Tisá Rocks). The highest point of the district is the mountain Rudný vrch in Telnice with an elevation of 796 m (2,612 ft), the lowest point is the river bed of the Elbe in Povrly at 130 m (430 ft).

From the total district area of 404.8 km^{2} (156.3 sq mi), agricultural land occupies 179.7 km^{2} (69.4 sq mi), forests occupy 134.3 km^{2} (51.9 sq mi), and water area occupies 10.5 km^{2} (4.1 sq mi). Forests cover 33.2% of the district's area.

The most important river is the Elbe, which drains the entire territory. The Bílina flows into the Elbe in Ústí nad Labem. The largest body of water is Lake Milada, an extensive artificial lake created by flooding mine.

There are two protected landscape areas: České středohoří that extends into the district in the south and east, and Labské pískovce that extends into the district in the northeast.

== Demographics ==
Historical population

Year	Pop.	±%
1869	52,939	—
1880	63,938	+20.8%
1890	79,096	+23.7%
1900	99,752	+26.1%
1910	116,412	+16.7%

Year	Pop.	±%
1921	118,843	+2.1%
1930	130,589	+9.9%
1950	93,490	−28.4%
1961	100,855	+7.9%
1970	105,922	+5.0%

Year	Pop.	±%
1980	115,161	+8.7%
1991	118,325	+2.7%
2001	117,780	−0.5%
2011	118,228	+0.4%
2021	115,581	−2.2%

Source: Censuses

=== Most populous municipalities ===
Name	Population	Area (km^{2})
Ústí nad Labem	90,035	94
Chlumec	4,228	13
Trmice	3,372	7
Chabařovice	2,564	17
Velké Březno	2,422	8
Povrly	2,305	26
Libouchec	1,929	28
Řehlovice	1,456	28

== Economy ==
The largest employers with headquarters in Ústí nad Labem District and at least 1,000 employees are:

Economic entity	Location	Number of employees	Main activity
Krajská zdravotní	Ústí nad Labem	10,000+	Health care
Regional Police Directorate of the Ústí nad Labem Region	Ústí nad Labem	3,000–3,999	Public order and safety activities
Jan Evangelista Purkyně University in Ústí nad Labem	Ústí nad Labem	1,500–1,999	Education

The largest industrial employers with its headquarters in Ústí nad Labem District and at least 500 employees are:

Economic entity	Location	Number of employees	Main activity
SSI Technologies	Přestanov	500–999	Manufacture of instruments and appliances for measuring
Black & Decker (Czech)	Trmice	500–999	Manufacture of tools
KS Kolbenschmidt Czech Republic	Trmice	500–999	Manufacture of pistons for engines
Spolek pro chemickou a hutní výrobu	Ústí nad Labem	500–999	Chemical industry

== Transport ==
The D8 motorway from Prague to Ústí nad Labem and Czech–German border runs through the district and constinues further to Dresden.

Ústí nad Labem District is an important junction. An important railway line from Prague to Dresden runs through it. The Elbe is used for ship transport.

== Sights ==
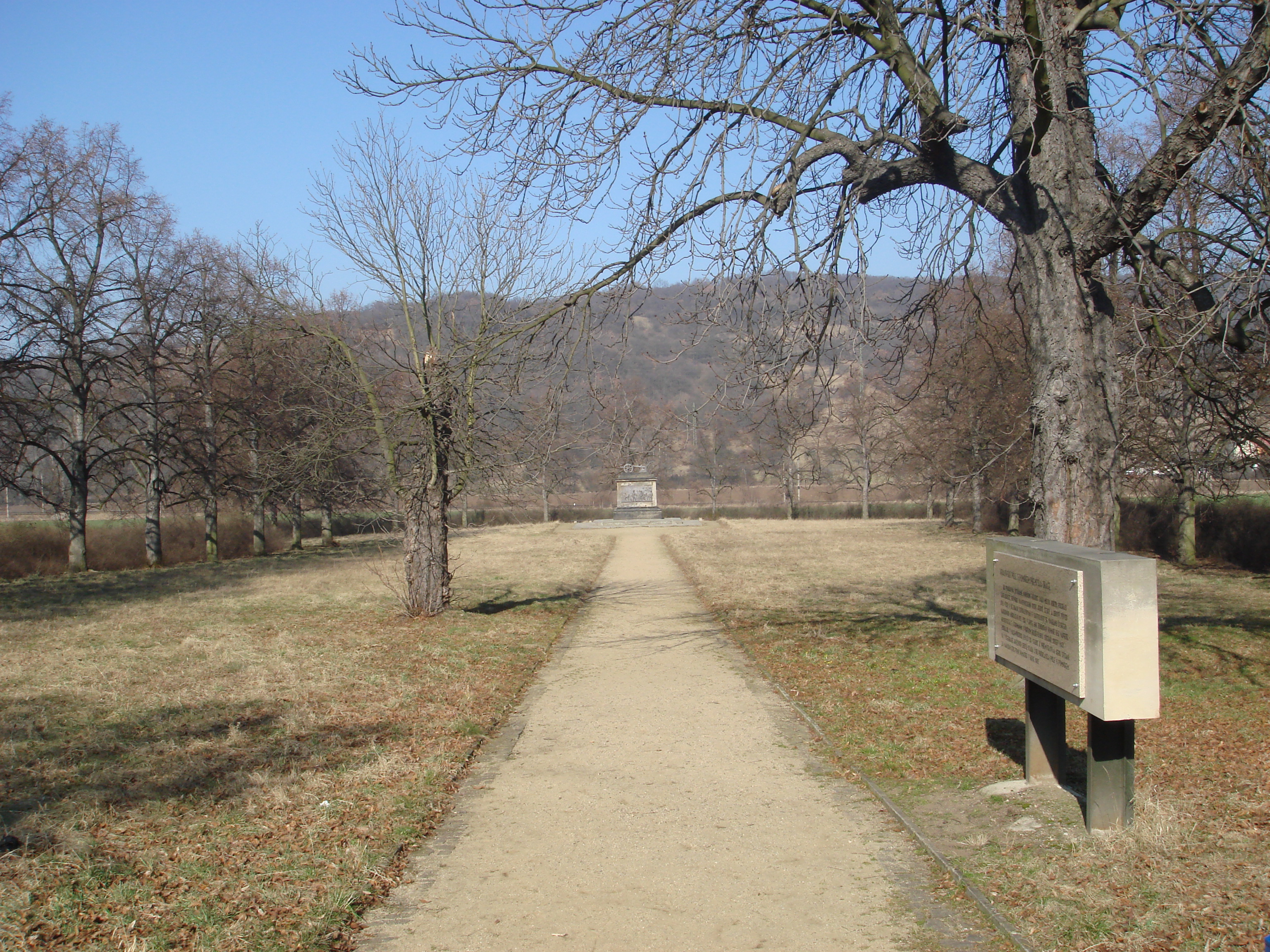
Royal field with the monument to Přemysl the Ploughman

The most important monuments in the district, protected as national cultural monuments, are:

- Royal field with the monument to Přemysl the Ploughman in Stadice
- Church of Saint Florian in Ústí nad Labem-Krásné Březno

The best-preserved settlements and landscape, protected as monument reservations and monument zones, are:

- Zubrnice (monument reservation)
- Chabařovice (monument zone)
- The territory of the Battle of Kulm near Přestanov, Chlumec and Varvažov (monument zone)

The most visited tourist destination is the Ústí nad Labem Zoo.
