= Telnice =

Telnice may refer to places in the Czech Republic:

- Telnice (Brno-Country District), a municipality and village in the South Moravian Region
- Telnice (Ústí nad Labem District), a municipality and village in the Ústí nad Labem Region
