= Libouchec =

- Municipality
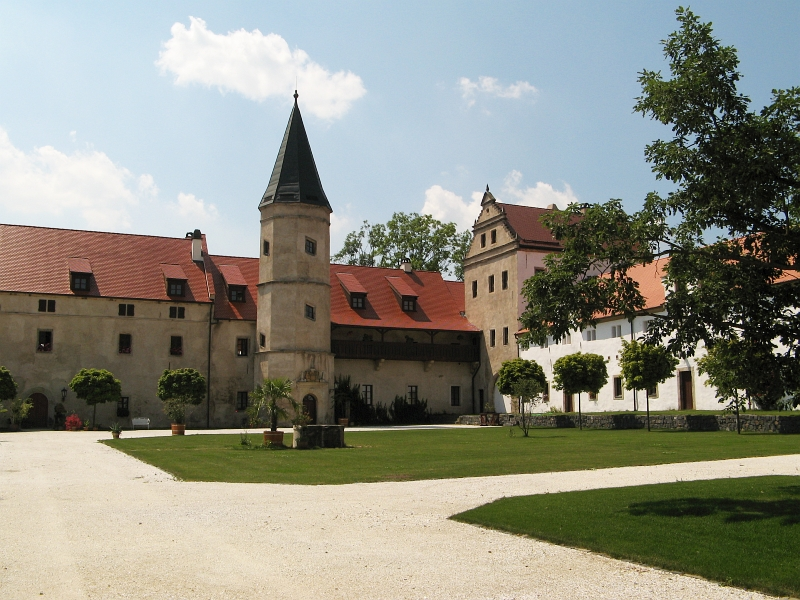
- Libouchec Castle

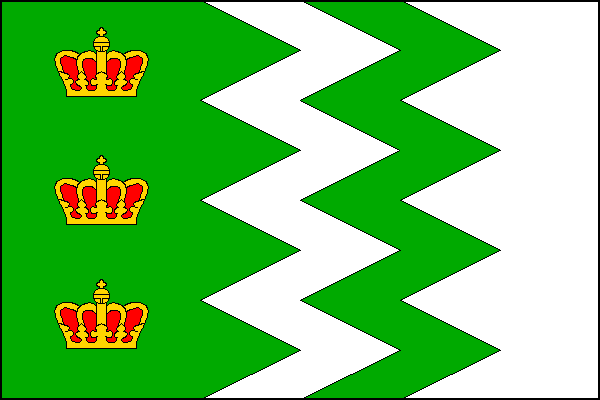
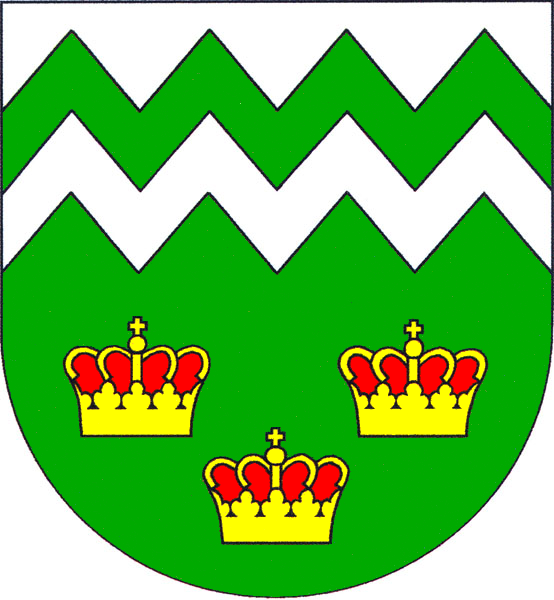
- Flag Coat of arms

- Location in the Czech Republic
- Coordinates: 50°45′31″N 14°2′27″E
- Country: Czech Republic
- Region: Ústí nad Labem
- District: Ústí nad Labem
- First mentioned: 1169

Area
  - Total: 28.02 km^{2} (10.82 sq mi)
- Elevation: 336 m (1,102 ft)

Population (2026-01-01)
  - Total: 1,929
  - Density: 68.84/km^{2} (178.3/sq mi)
- Time zone: UTC+1 (CET)
  - Summer (DST): UTC+2 (CEST)
- Postal codes: 400 02, 403 35
- Website: www.libouchec.cz

Libouchec (German: Königswald) is a municipality and village in Ústí nad Labem District in the Ústí nad Labem Region of the Czech Republic. It has about 1,900 inhabitants.

== Administrative division ==
Libouchec consists of four municipal parts (in brackets population according to the 2021 census):

- Libouchec (1,655)
- Čermná (93)
- Knínice (56)
- Žďárek (30)

== Etymology ==
The initial German name of the village of Libouchec was Königswald, meaning "king's forest". It was derived from the Latin name of the local forest, Regia silva. Libouchec was initially only the name of the local stream and was already used in 1169. As the Czech name of the settlement, it was first documented in 1543.

== Geography ==
Libouchec is located about 9 kilometres (6 mi) north of Ústí nad Labem. The municipal territory is very diverse and lies on the border of four nature regions. The built-up area is situated in the valley of the stream Jílovský potok, which is part of the Most Basin. The valley separates the Central Bohemian Uplands and the eastern tip of the Ore Mountains. The northeastern part of the municipality extends into the Elbe Sandstone Mountains and includes the highest point of the municipality, which is the ridge Nad Stěnami at 623 m (2,044 ft) above sea level.

== History ==
The first settlers of the area were Celts and Germanic peoples, and from the 5th century Slavs. The first written mention of a fortress in the area is from 1169. In the 13th century, a settlement called Regis Silva was founded around the fortress. The first written mention of this settlement that became known as Libouchec is from 1352.

An important salt trail was running through Libouchec. Salt was carried from here to Děčín where it was embarked and sent to inland. There started an important production in manufacture in the end of feudalism (buttons, textile, primitive machines). In the 16th century, the nobility from Bynov began with logging and mining of ore and silver. In the 19th century, its surroundings were an industrial region. There began the production of velvet, liqueurs, mustard and agricultural machines.

Important was the railway which led from Duchcov to Děčín. It was built in 1869 and was the most expensive railway in the country being built at that time. The operation of this railway was abolished in 2008.

== Demographics ==
Historical population

Year	Pop.	±%
1869	2,226	—
1880	2,432	+9.3%
1890	2,479	+1.9%
1900	2,443	−1.5%
1910	2,609	+6.8%

Year	Pop.	±%
1921	2,433	−6.7%
1930	2,770	+13.9%
1950	1,755	−36.6%
1961	1,824	+3.9%
1970	1,824	+0.0%

Year	Pop.	±%
1980	1,811	−0.7%
1991	1,671	−7.7%
2001	1,683	+0.7%
2011	1,753	+4.2%
2021	1,834	+4.6%

Source: Censuses

== Transport ==
During the tourist season, on weekends and holidays, a train on the Děčín–Telnice line runs through Libouchec. The ČSD Class M 152.0 retro train drives there.

== Sights ==
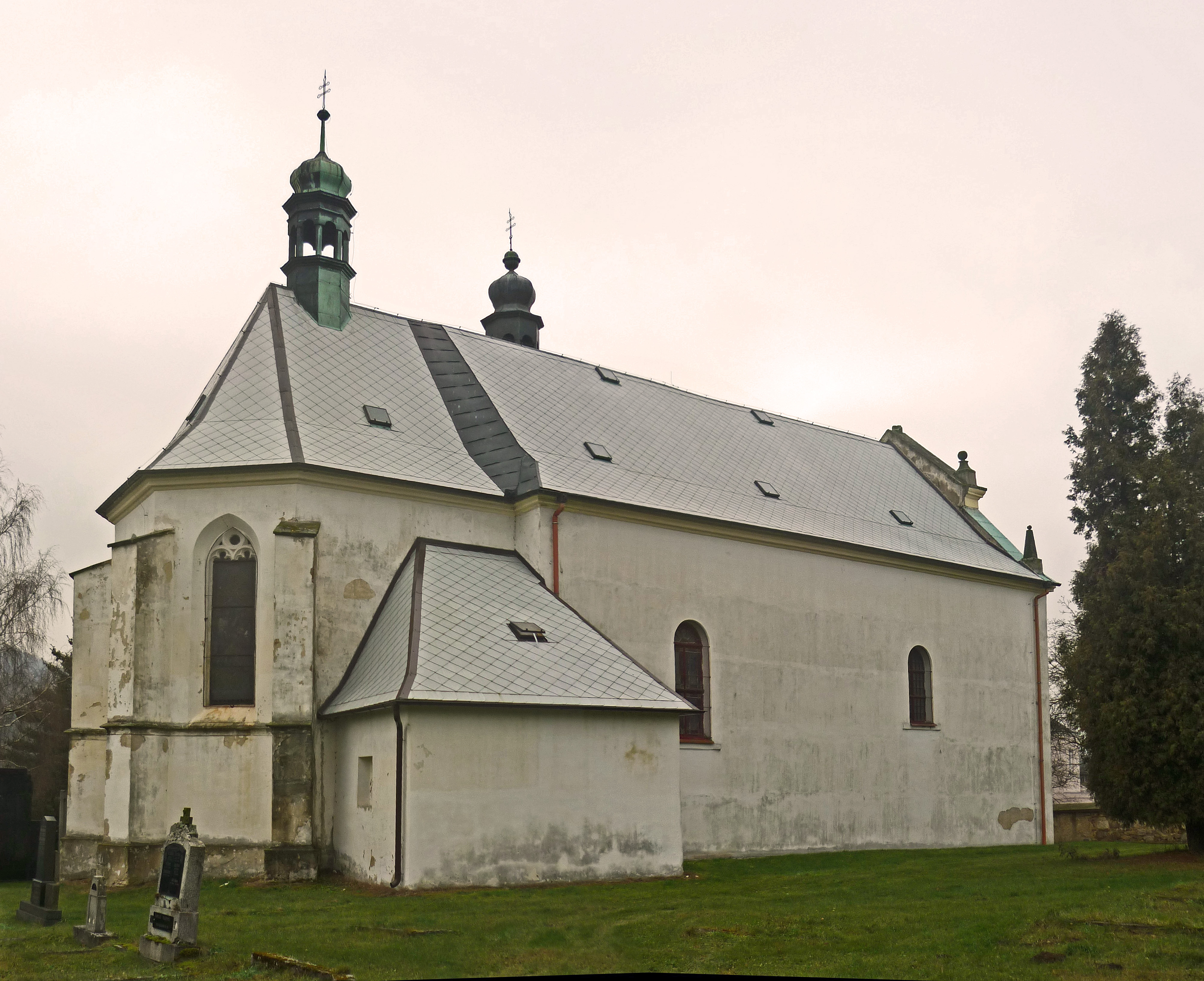
Church of Three Wise Men

The most significant buildings are the Church of Three Wise Men and the castle. The church was built in 1357; after burning out it was repaired in the 16th century and from that time it was rebuilt many times.

The Libouchec Castle, originally named Schönstein, was established by Günter of Bünau in the 16th century. Due to the Thirty Years' War and fires, the castle gradually fell into disrepair and it has been in the emergency conditions. In 2003, the castle was sold and has since been repaired.
