= Dolní Zálezly =

- Municipality
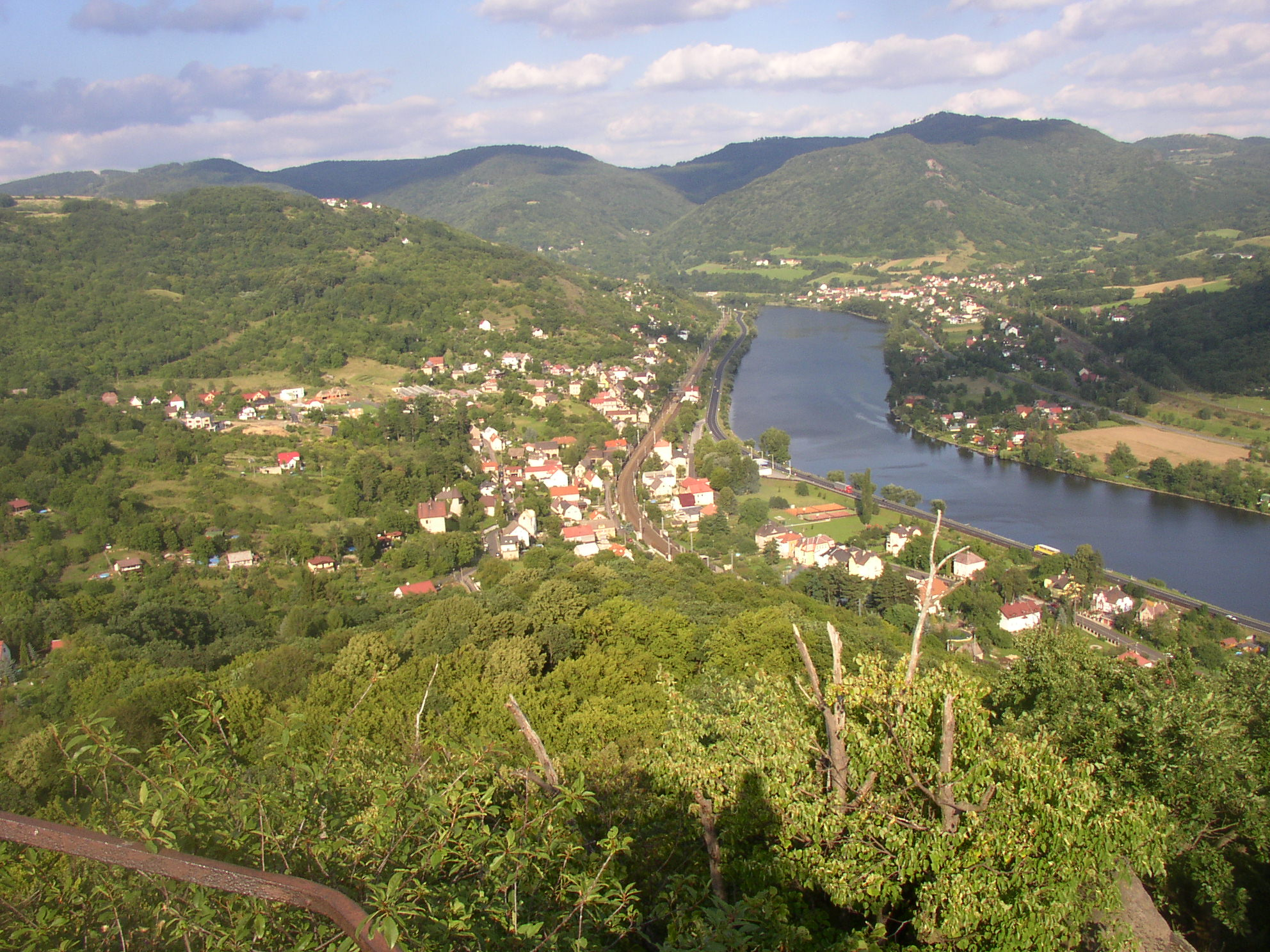
- General view

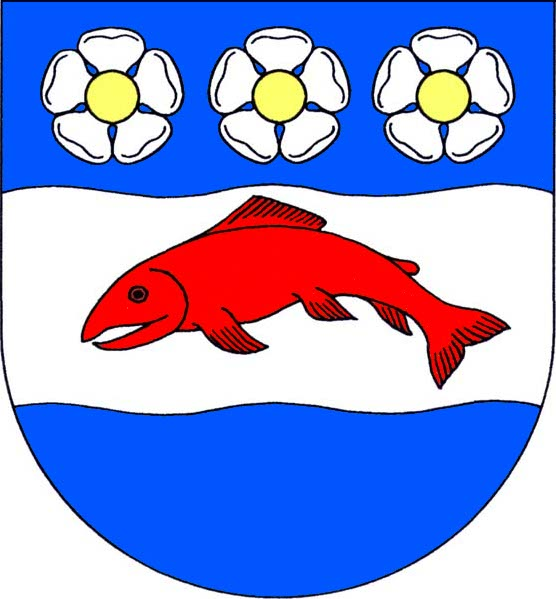
- Flag Coat of arms

- Location in the Czech Republic
- Coordinates: 50°35′51″N 14°2′35″E
- Country: Czech Republic
- Region: Ústí nad Labem
- District: Ústí nad Labem
- First mentioned: 1057

Area
  - Total: 3.57 km^{2} (1.38 sq mi)
- Elevation: 170 m (560 ft)

Population (2026-01-01)
  - Total: 565
  - Density: 158/km^{2} (410/sq mi)
- Time zone: UTC+1 (CET)
  - Summer (DST): UTC+2 (CEST)
- Postal code: 403 01
- Website: www.dolni-zalezly.cz

Dolní Zálezly (German: Salesel) is a municipality and village in Ústí nad Labem District in the Ústí nad Labem Region of the Czech Republic. It has about 600 inhabitants.

== Etymology ==
The initial name of the village was just Zálezly. The name was derived from the Czech adjective zalezlý ('tucked away'), which figuratively referred to a remote village. In 1949, the prefix dolní ('lower') was added to the name to distinguish the village from the nearby village of the same name (today known as Horní Zálezly, part of Malečov).

== Geography ==
Dolní Zálezly is located about 7 kilometres (4 mi) south of Ústí nad Labem. It lies in Central Bohemian Uplands. The highest point is at 443 m (1,453 ft) above sea level. The municipality is situated on the left bank of the Elbe River.

== History ==
The first written mention of Dolní Zálezly is in the foundation deed of the Litoměřice Chapter from 1057. In feudal times, the village was divided into several parts that had different owners.

== Demographics ==
Historical population

Year	Pop.	±%
1869	460	—
1880	471	+2.4%
1890	472	+0.2%
1900	507	+7.4%
1910	576	+13.6%

Year	Pop.	±%
1921	631	+9.5%
1930	779	+23.5%
1950	587	−24.6%
1961	670	+14.1%
1970	635	−5.2%

Year	Pop.	±%
1980	553	−12.9%
1991	472	−14.6%
2001	505	+7.0%
2011	545	+7.9%
2021	539	−1.1%

Source: Censuses

== Transport ==
The I/30 road from Ústí nad Labem to Lovosice runs through the municipality.

Dolní Zálezly is located on the railway line Prague–Ústí nad Labem.

== Sights ==
Among the protected cultural monuments in the municipality are a statue of St. John of Nepomuk from 1719, an Ecce Homo statue from 1820 and the Neoclassical train station building from 1850.
