= Habrovany =

Habrovany may refer to places in the Czech Republic:

- Habrovany (Ústí nad Labem District), a municipality and village in the Ústí nad Labem Region
- Habrovany (Vyškov District), a municipality and village in the South Moravian Region
