= Malé Březno (Ústí nad Labem District) =

- Municipality
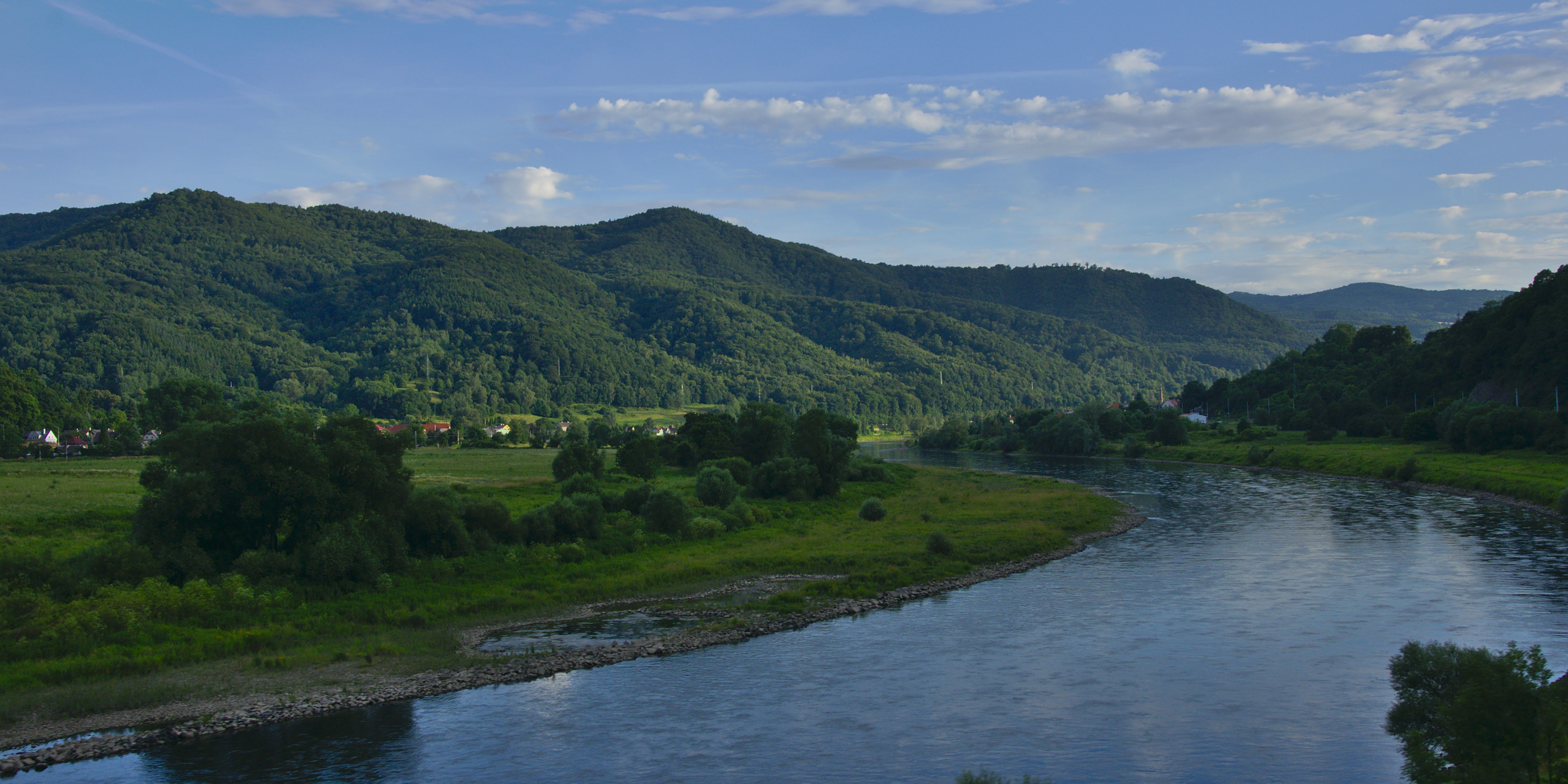
- Malé Březno on the bank of the Elbe River

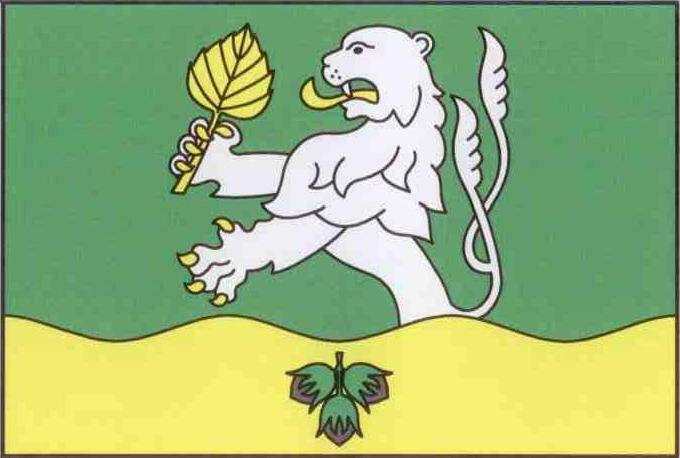
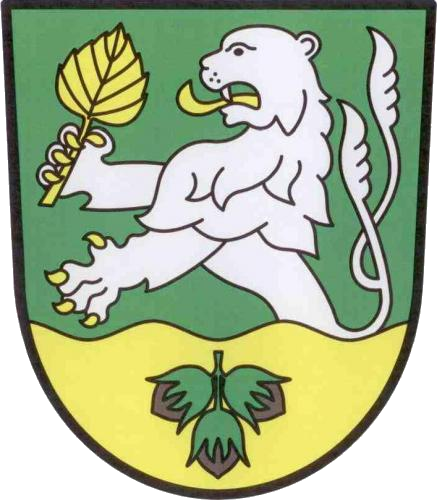
- Flag Coat of arms

- Location in the Czech Republic
- Coordinates: 50°40′22″N 14°10′20″E
- Country: Czech Republic
- Region: Ústí nad Labem
- District: Ústí nad Labem
- First mentioned: 1188

Area
  - Total: 11.06 km^{2} (4.27 sq mi)
- Elevation: 135 m (443 ft)

Population (2026-01-01)
  - Total: 521
  - Density: 47.1/km^{2} (122/sq mi)
- Time zone: UTC+1 (CET)
  - Summer (DST): UTC+2 (CEST)
- Postal code: 400 02
- Website: www.malebrezno.cz

Malé Březno (German: Klein Priesen) is a municipality and village in Ústí nad Labem District in the Ústí nad Labem Region of the Czech Republic. It has about 500 inhabitants.

Malé Březno lies approximately 10 kilometres (6 mi) east of Ústí nad Labem and 68 km (42 mi) north of Prague.

== Administrative division ==
Malé Březno consists of two municipal parts (in brackets population according to the 2021 census):

- Malé Březno (365)
- Leština (131)

== Demographics ==
Historical population
Year	Pop.	±%
1869	692	—
1880	777	+12.3%
1890	886	+14.0%
1900	908	+2.5%
1910	1,148	+26.4%
1921	1,086	−5.4%
1930	1,325	+22.0%
1950	732	−44.8%
1961	741	+1.2%
1970	658	−11.2%
1980	564	−14.3%
1991	482	−14.5%
2001	516	+7.1%
2011	494	−4.3%
2021	496	+0.4%
Source: Censuses
