= Chuderov =

- Municipality
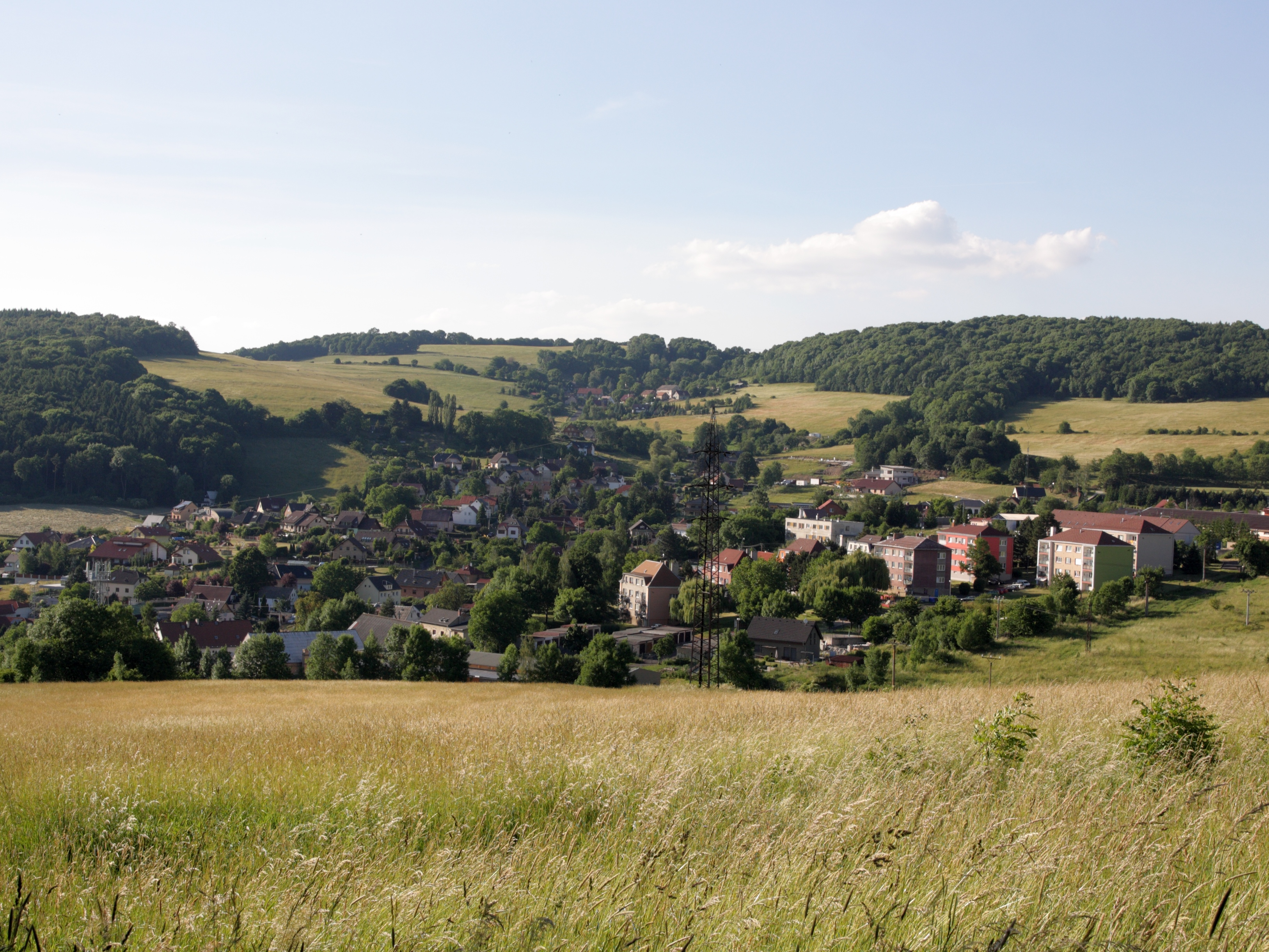
- View from the southeast

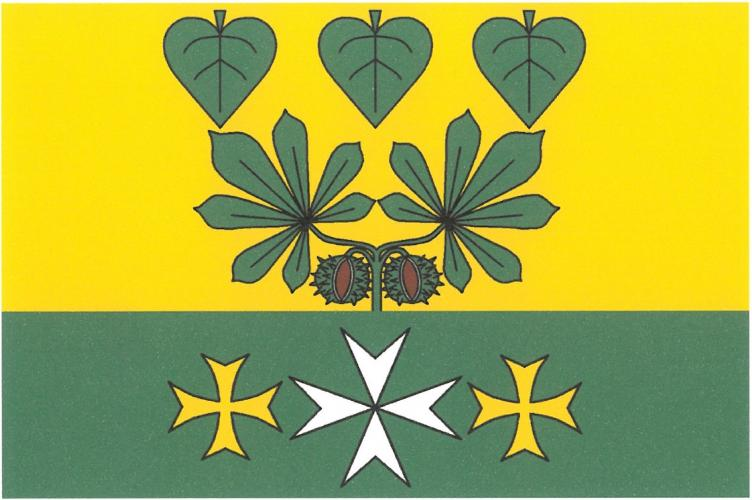
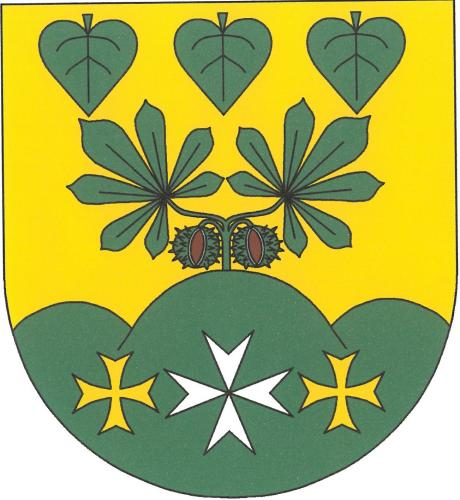
- Flag Coat of arms

- Location in the Czech Republic
- Coordinates: 50°41′19″N 14°2′47″E
- Country: Czech Republic
- Region: Ústí nad Labem
- District: Ústí nad Labem
- First mentioned: 1348

Area
  - Total: 15.35 km^{2} (5.93 sq mi)
- Elevation: 340 m (1,120 ft)

Population (2026-01-01)
  - Total: 1,199
  - Density: 78.11/km^{2} (202.3/sq mi)
- Time zone: UTC+1 (CET)
  - Summer (DST): UTC+2 (CEST)
- Postal code: 400 02
- Website: www.chuderov.cz

Chuderov (German: Groß Kaudern) is a municipality and village in Ústí nad Labem District in the Ústí nad Labem Region of the Czech Republic. It has about 1,200 inhabitants.

Chuderov lies approximately 4 kilometres (2 mi) north of Ústí nad Labem and 73 km (45 mi) north of Prague.

== Administrative division ==
Chuderov consists of six municipal parts (in brackets population according to the 2021 census):

- Chuderov (585)
- Chuderovec (115)
- Libov (34)
- Lipová (87)
- Radešín (89)
- Žežice (160)

== Demographics ==
Historical population
Year	Pop.	±%
1869	993	—
1880	993	+0.0%
1890	927	−6.6%
1900	1,036	+11.8%
1910	1,189	+14.8%
1921	1,087	−8.6%
1930	1,118	+2.9%
1950	627	−43.9%
1961	580	−7.5%
1970	556	−4.1%
1980	658	+18.3%
1991	608	−7.6%
2001	743	+22.2%
2011	944	+27.1%
2021	1,070	+13.3%
Source: Censuses
