= Stebno =

- Municipality
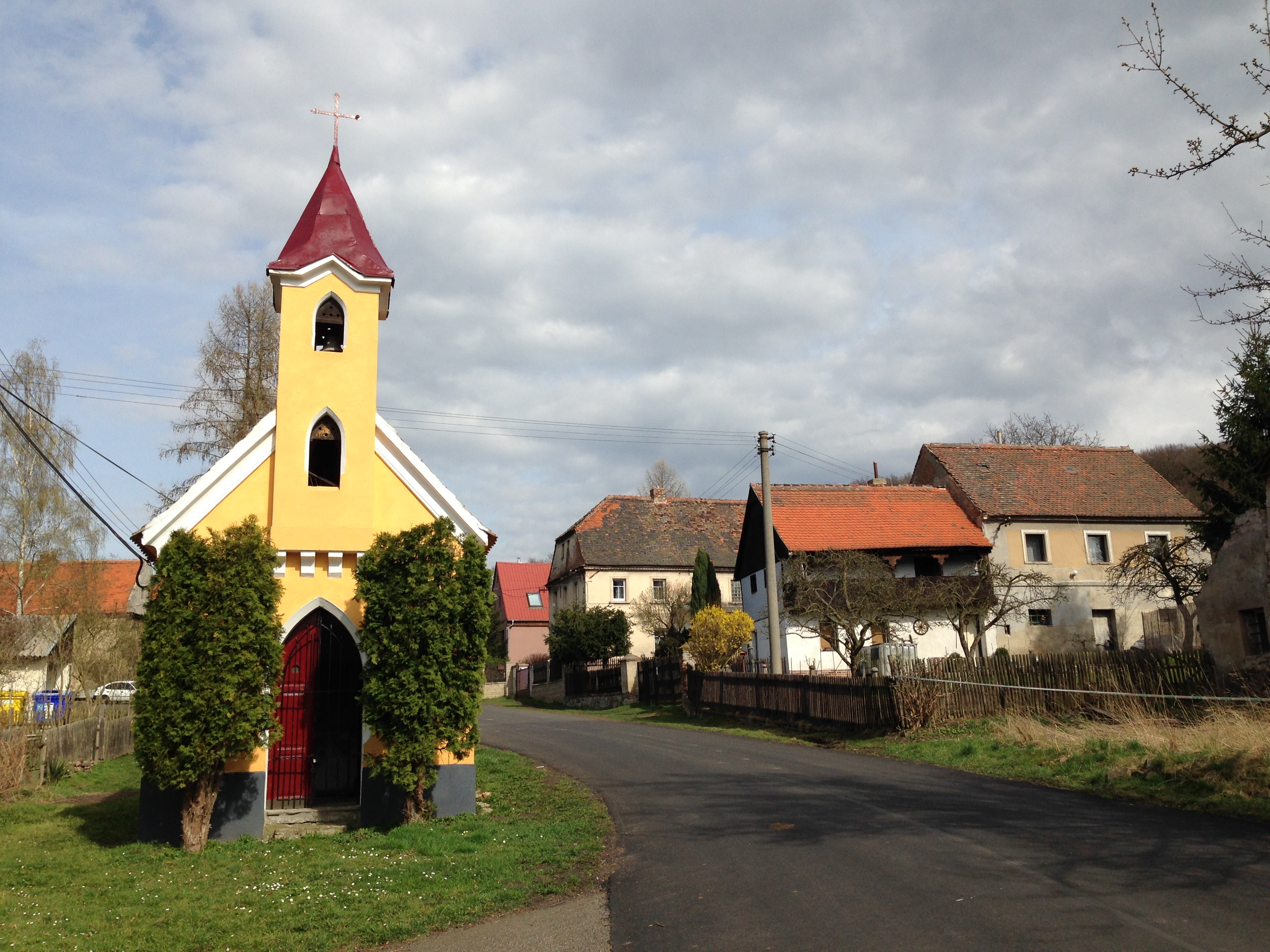
- Chapel of Saint Florian in Suchá

- Flag Coat of arms

- Location in the Czech Republic
- Coordinates: 50°36′55″N 14°1′2″E
- Country: Czech Republic
- Region: Ústí nad Labem
- District: Ústí nad Labem
- First mentioned: 1352

Area
  - Total: 10.94 km^{2} (4.22 sq mi)
- Elevation: 404 m (1,325 ft)

Population (2026-01-01)
  - Total: 472
  - Density: 43.1/km^{2} (112/sq mi)
- Time zone: UTC+1 (CET)
  - Summer (DST): UTC+2 (CEST)
- Postal code: 400 02
- Website: www.stebno.cz

Stebno (German: Stöben) is a municipality and village in Ústí nad Labem District in the Ústí nad Labem Region of the Czech Republic. It has about 500 inhabitants.

Stebno lies approximately 6 kilometres (4 mi) south of Ústí nad Labem and 66 km (41 mi) north-west of Prague.

== Administrative division ==
Stebno consists of five municipal parts (in brackets population according to the 2021 census):

- Stebno (139)
- Chvalov (95)
- Milbohov (65)
- Podlešín (66)
- Suchá (70)

== Demographics ==
Historical population
Year	Pop.	±%
1869	792	—
1880	760	−4.0%
1890	728	−4.2%
1900	739	+1.5%
1910	742	+0.4%
1921	769	+3.6%
1930	766	−0.4%
1950	462	−39.7%
1961	361	−21.9%
1970	416	+15.2%
1980	361	−13.2%
1991	280	−22.4%
2001	397	+41.8%
2011	414	+4.3%
2021	435	+5.1%
Source: Censuses
