= Ryjice =

- Municipality
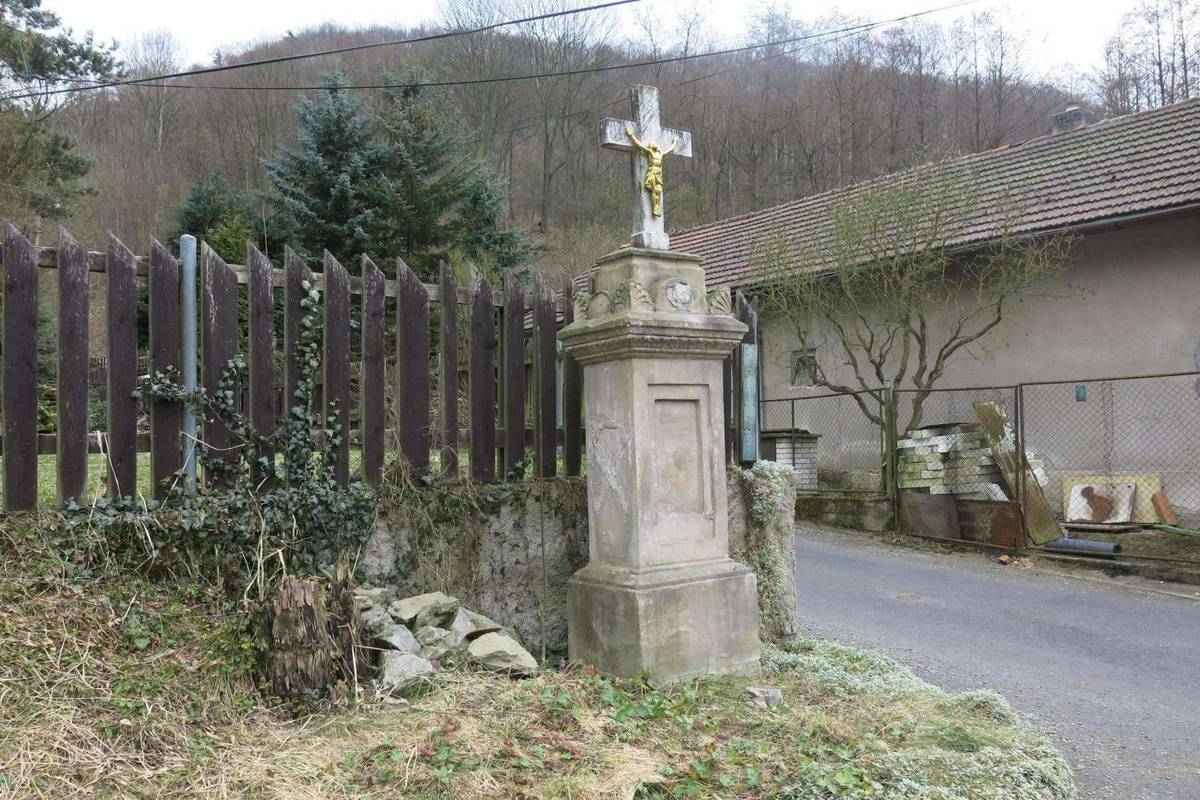
- Memorial cross in Ryjice

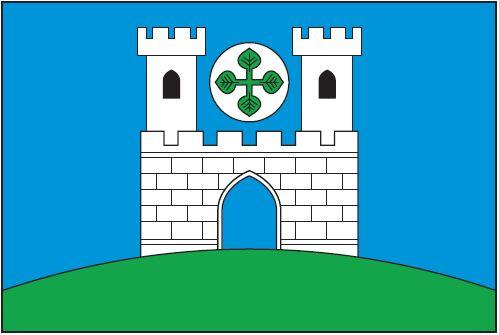
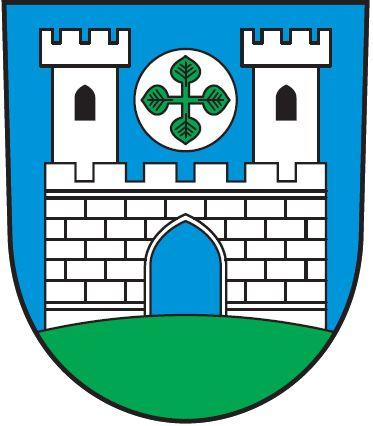
- Flag Coat of arms

- Location in the Czech Republic
- Coordinates: 50°41′17″N 14°5′32″E
- Country: Czech Republic
- Region: Ústí nad Labem
- District: Ústí nad Labem
- First mentioned: 1186

Area
  - Total: 1.59 km^{2} (0.61 sq mi)
- Elevation: 290 m (950 ft)

Population (2026-01-01)
  - Total: 187
  - Density: 118/km^{2} (305/sq mi)
- Time zone: UTC+1 (CET)
  - Summer (DST): UTC+2 (CEST)
- Postal code: 403 31
- Website: www.ryjice.cz

Ryjice (German: Reindlitz) is a municipality and village in Ústí nad Labem District in the Ústí nad Labem Region of the Czech Republic. It has about 200 inhabitants.

Ryjice lies approximately 5 kilometres (3 mi) north-east of Ústí nad Labem and 71 km (44 mi) north of Prague.

== Demographics ==
Historical population
Year	Pop.	±%
1869	219	—
1880	211	−3.7%
1890	204	−3.3%
1900	225	+10.3%
1910	327	+45.3%
1921	292	−10.7%
1930	399	+36.6%
1950	326	−18.3%
1961	180	−44.8%
1970	182	+1.1%
1980	195	+7.1%
1991	163	−16.4%
2001	196	+20.2%
2011	270	+37.8%
2021	197	−27.0%
Source: Censuses
