= Tašov =

- Municipality
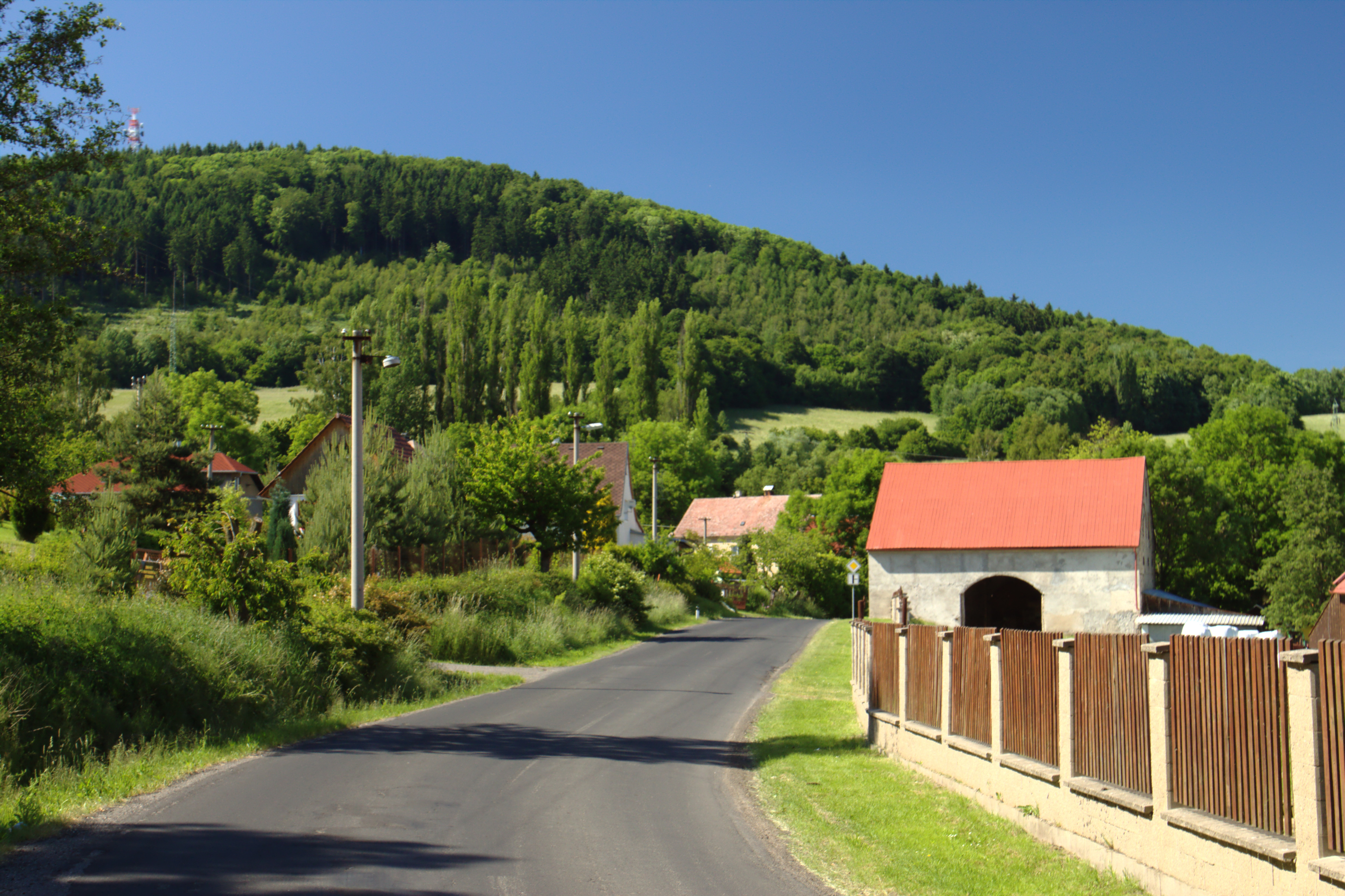
- Main road

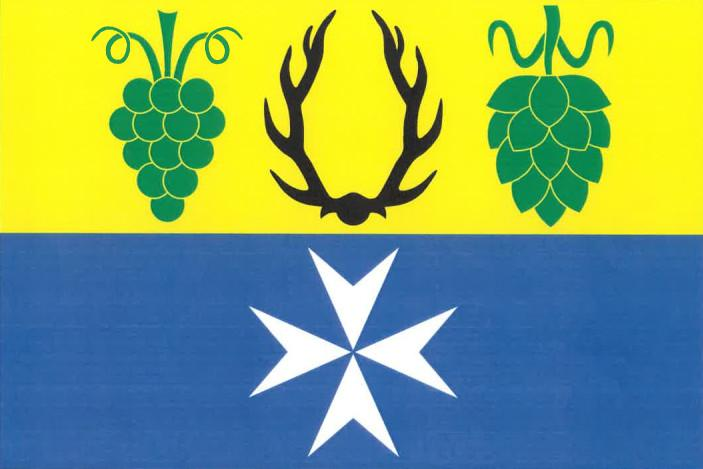
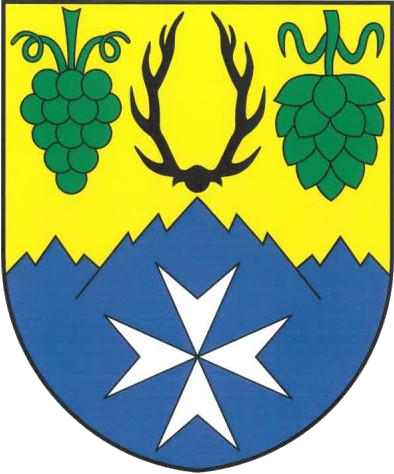
- Flag Coat of arms

- Location in the Czech Republic
- Coordinates: 50°36′53″N 14°8′9″E
- Country: Czech Republic
- Region: Ústí nad Labem
- District: Ústí nad Labem
- First mentioned: 1188

Area
  - Total: 3.60 km^{2} (1.39 sq mi)
- Elevation: 456 m (1,496 ft)

Population (2026-01-01)
  - Total: 138
  - Density: 38.3/km^{2} (99.3/sq mi)
- Time zone: UTC+1 (CET)
  - Summer (DST): UTC+2 (CEST)
- Postal code: 400 02
- Website: www.obectasov.cz

Tašov (German: Taschow) is a municipality and village in Ústí nad Labem District in the Ústí nad Labem Region of the Czech Republic. It has about 100 inhabitants.

Tašov lies approximately 9 kilometres (6 mi) south-east of Ústí nad Labem and 62 km (39 mi) north of Prague.

== Demographics ==
Historical population
Year	Pop.	±%
1869	230	—
1880	229	−0.4%
1890	212	−7.4%
1900	189	−10.8%
1910	195	+3.2%
1921	191	−2.1%
1930	194	+1.6%
1950	86	−55.7%
1961	83	−3.5%
1970	83	+0.0%
1980	91	+9.6%
1991	77	−15.4%
2001	100	+29.9%
2011	156	+56.0%
2021	137	−12.2%
Source: Censuses
