= Řehlovice =

- Municipality
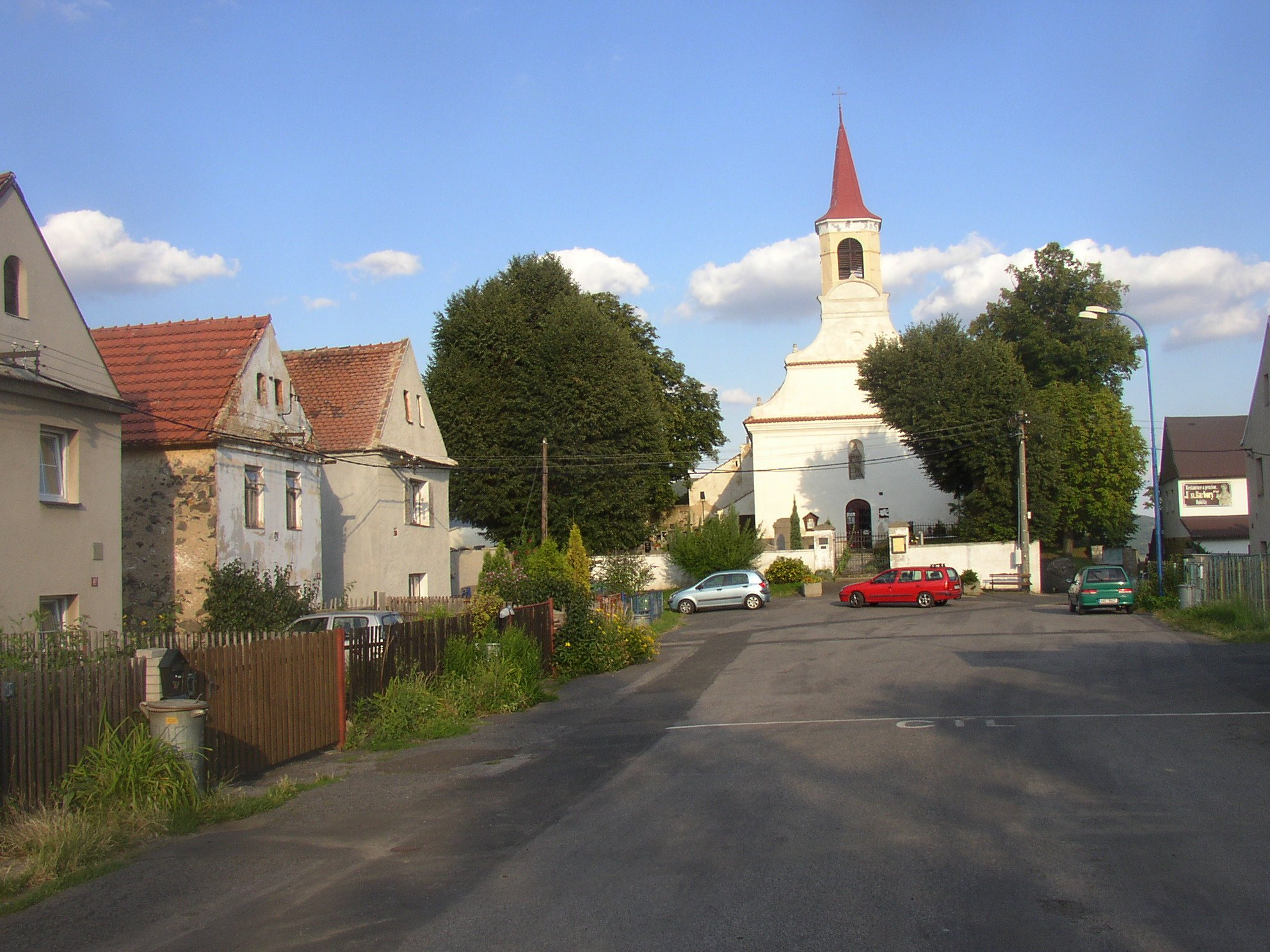
- Dubice, a part of Řehlovice

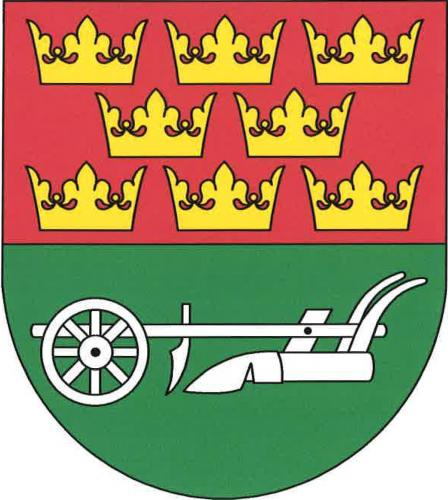
- Coat of arms

- Location in the Czech Republic
- Coordinates: 50°36′26″N 13°57′15″E
- Country: Czech Republic
- Region: Ústí nad Labem
- District: Ústí nad Labem
- First mentioned: 1328

Area
  - Total: 27.98 km^{2} (10.80 sq mi)
- Elevation: 165 m (541 ft)

Population (2026-01-01)
  - Total: 1,456
  - Density: 52.04/km^{2} (134.8/sq mi)
- Time zone: UTC+1 (CET)
  - Summer (DST): UTC+2 (CEST)
- Postal codes: 400 02, 403 13
- Website: www.rehlovice.cz

Řehlovice (German: Groß Tschochau) is a municipality and village in Ústí nad Labem District in the Ústí nad Labem Region of the Czech Republic. It has about 1,500 inhabitants.

Řehlovice lies approximately 8 kilometres (5 mi) south-west of Ústí nad Labem and 68 km (42 mi) north-west of Prague.

== Administrative division ==
Řehlovice consists of eight municipal parts (in brackets population according to the 2021 census):

- Řehlovice (459)
- Brozánky (129)
- Dubice (291)
- Habří (77)
- Hliňany (0)
- Moravany (46)
- Radejčín (94)
- Stadice (295)

== Demographics ==
Historical population
Year	Pop.	±%
1869	1,798	—
1880	2,007	+11.6%
1890	1,939	−3.4%
1900	2,022	+4.3%
1910	2,180	+7.8%
1921	2,107	−3.3%
1930	2,268	+7.6%
1950	1,429	−37.0%
1961	1,505	+5.3%
1970	1,466	−2.6%
1980	1,317	−10.2%
1991	1,017	−22.8%
2001	1,024	+0.7%
2011	1,270	+24.0%
2021	1,391	+9.5%
Source: Censuses

== Notable people ==
- Julius Mader (1928–2000), German jurist, journalist and writer
