= Přestanov =

- Municipality
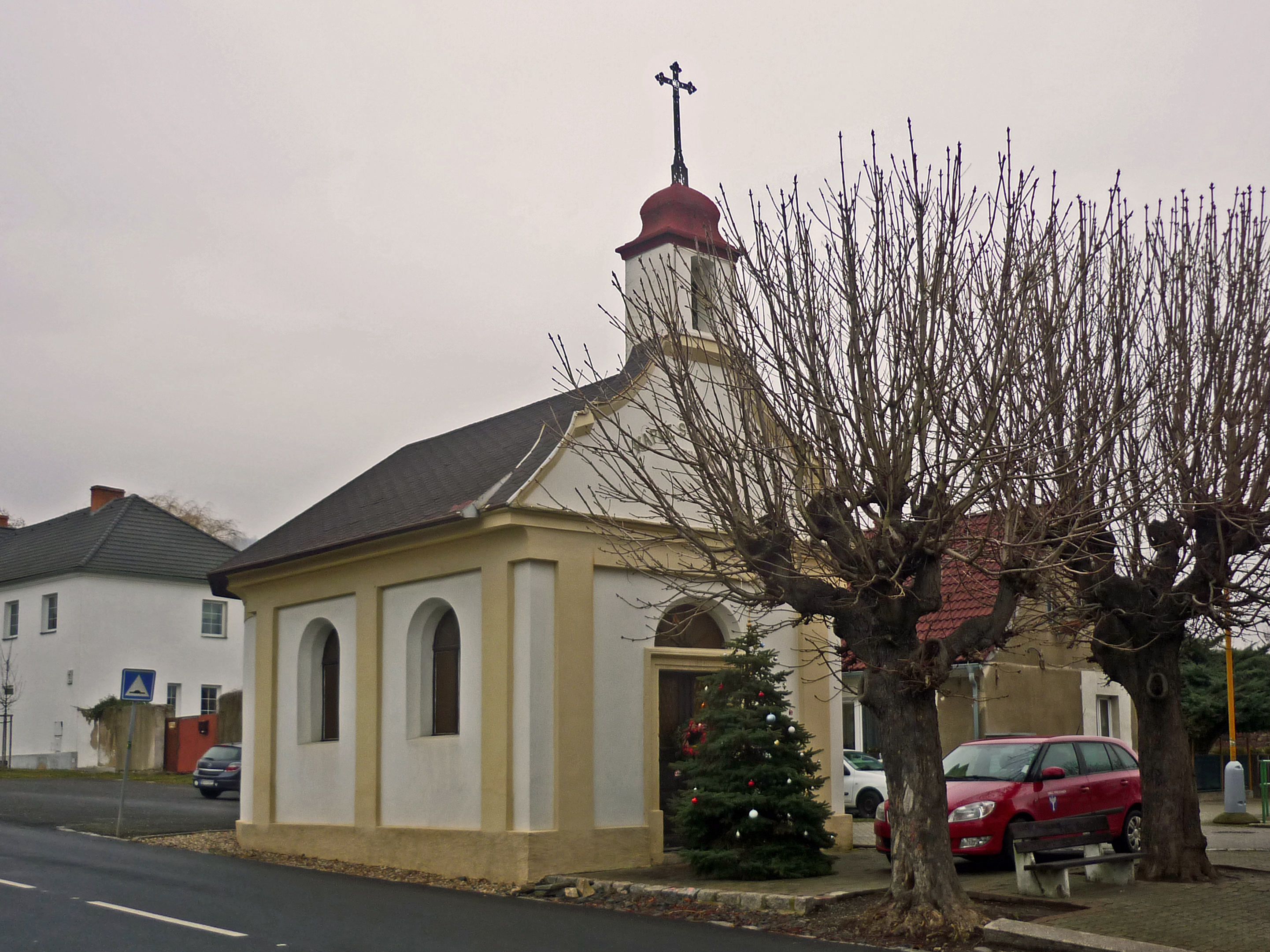
- Chapel of Saint Anthony of Padua

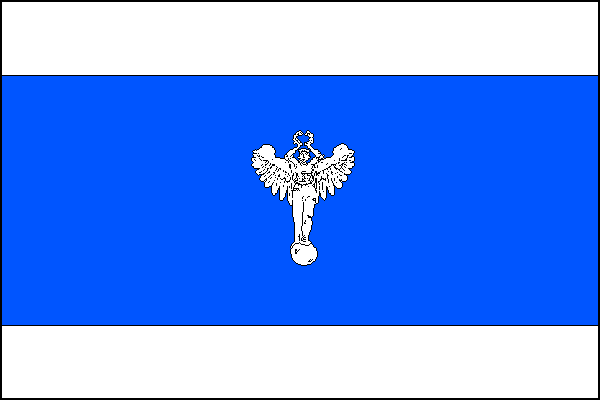
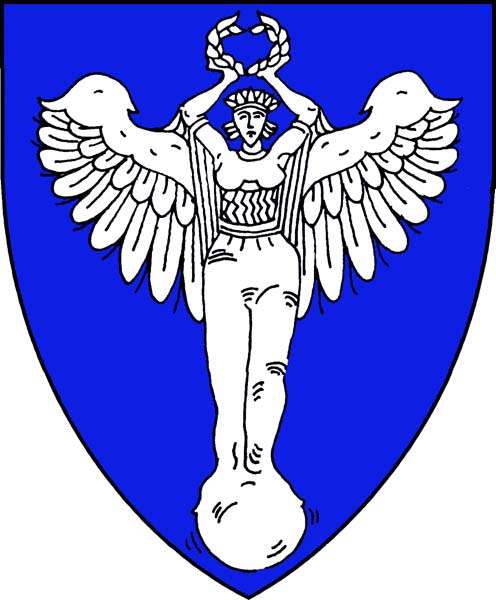
- Flag Coat of arms

- Location in the Czech Republic
- Coordinates: 50°41′12″N 13°55′13″E
- Country: Czech Republic
- Region: Ústí nad Labem
- District: Ústí nad Labem
- First mentioned: 1348

Area
  - Total: 2.05 km^{2} (0.79 sq mi)
- Elevation: 220 m (720 ft)

Population (2026-01-01)
  - Total: 672
  - Density: 328/km^{2} (849/sq mi)
- Time zone: UTC+1 (CET)
  - Summer (DST): UTC+2 (CEST)
- Postal code: 403 17
- Website: www.prestanov.cz

Přestanov (German: Priesten) is a municipality and village in Ústí nad Labem District in the Ústí nad Labem Region of the Czech Republic. It has about 700 inhabitants.

== Geography ==
Přestanov is located about 7 kilometres (4 mi) west of Ústí nad Labem.

== Demographics ==
Historical population
Year	Pop.	±%
1869	235	—
1880	327	+39.1%
1890	317	−3.1%
1900	320	+0.9%
1910	359	+12.2%
1921	312	−13.1%
1930	608	+94.9%
1950	398	−34.5%
1961	390	−2.0%
1970	342	−12.3%
1980	309	−9.6%
1991	219	−29.1%
2001	290	+32.4%
2011	411	+41.7%
2021	471	+14.6%
Source: Censuses

== Twin towns – sister cities ==
Přestanov is twinned with:

- Drebach, Germany
