= Homole u Panny =

- Municipality
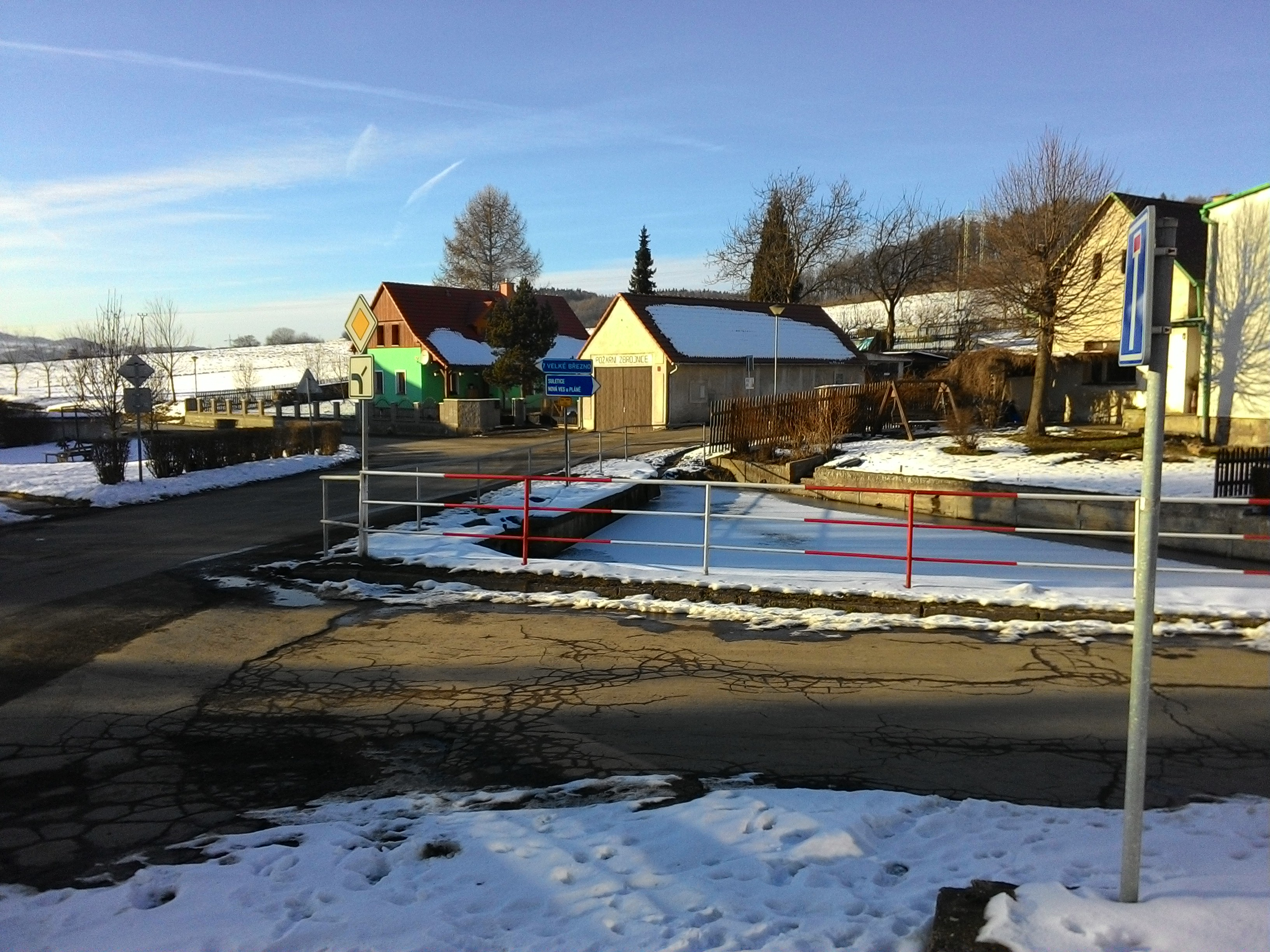
- Centre of Homole u Panny

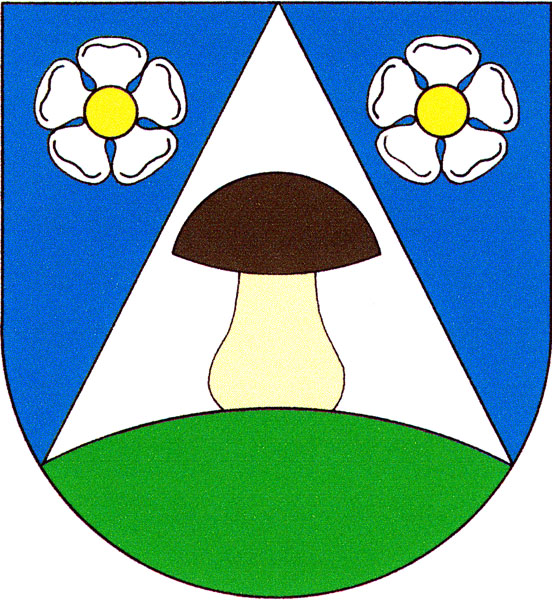
- Flag Coat of arms

- Location in the Czech Republic
- Coordinates: 50°37′46″N 14°11′11″E
- Country: Czech Republic
- Region: Ústí nad Labem
- District: Ústí nad Labem
- First mentioned: 1407

Area
  - Total: 11.77 km^{2} (4.54 sq mi)
- Elevation: 375 m (1,230 ft)

Population (2026-01-01)
  - Total: 393
  - Density: 33.4/km^{2} (86.5/sq mi)
- Time zone: UTC+1 (CET)
  - Summer (DST): UTC+2 (CEST)
- Postal code: 400 02
- Website: www.homoleupanny.cz

Homole u Panny (until 1991 Homole; German: Hummel) is a municipality and village in Ústí nad Labem District in the Ústí nad Labem Region of the Czech Republic. It has about 400 inhabitants.

Homole u Panny lies approximately 11 kilometres (7 mi) east of Ústí nad Labem and 63 km (39 mi) north of Prague.

== Administrative division ==
Homole u Panny consists of nine municipal parts (in brackets population according to the 2021 census):

- Homole u Panny (138)
- Babiny II (17)
- Bláhov (31)
- Byňov (30)
- Doubravice (8)
- Haslice (31)
- Lhota pod Pannou (85)
- Nová Ves u Pláně (20)
- Suletice (35)

== Demographics ==
Historical population
| Year | Pop. | ±% |
|---|---|---|
| 1869 | 1,177 | — |
| 1880 | 1,121 | −4.8% |
| 1890 | 1,109 | −1.1% |
| 1900 | 1,039 | −6.3% |
| 1910 | 1,068 | +2.8% |
| 1921 | 961 | −10.0% |
| 1930 | 1,072 | +11.6% |
| 1950 | 455 | −57.6% |
| 1961 | 408 | −10.3% |
| 1970 | 309 | −24.3% |
| 1980 | 286 | −7.4% |
| 1991 | 261 | −8.7% |
| 2001 | 356 | +36.4% |
| 2011 | 357 | +0.3% |
| 2021 | 395 | +10.6% |
Source: Censuses
