= Povrly =

- Municipality
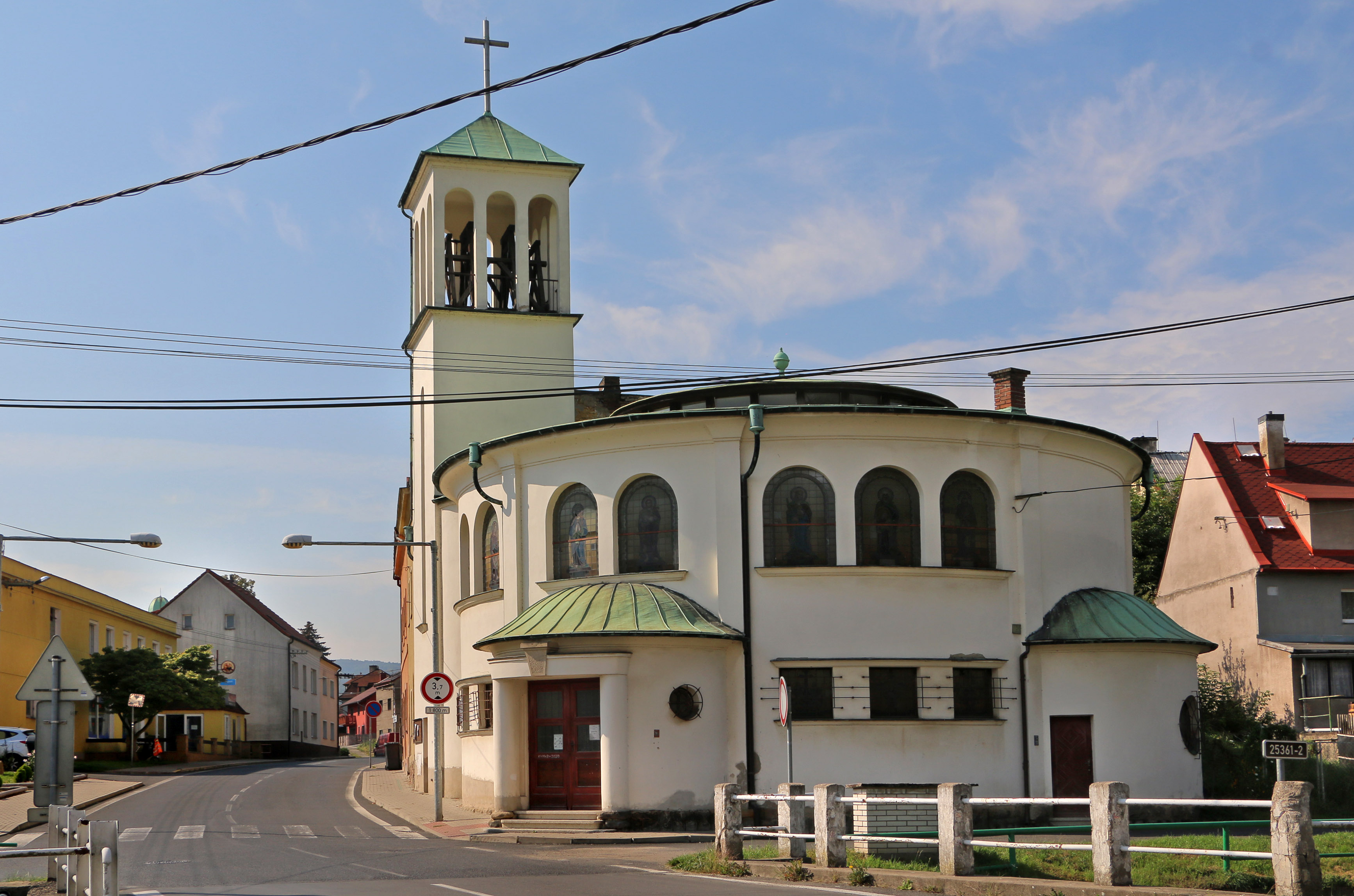
- Church of the Visitation of the Virgin Mary

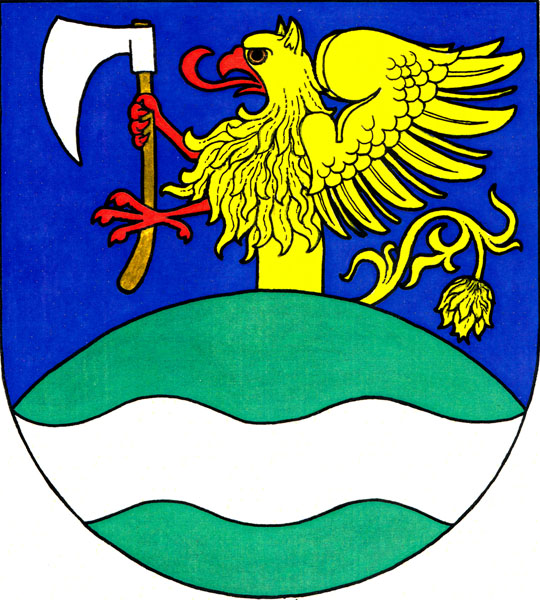
- Flag Coat of arms

- Location in the Czech Republic
- Coordinates: 50°40′22″N 14°9′38″E
- Country: Czech Republic
- Region: Ústí nad Labem
- District: Ústí nad Labem
- First mentioned: 1186

Area
  - Total: 25.57 km^{2} (9.87 sq mi)
- Elevation: 143 m (469 ft)

Population (2026-01-01)
  - Total: 2,305
  - Density: 90.14/km^{2} (233.5/sq mi)
- Time zone: UTC+1 (CET)
  - Summer (DST): UTC+2 (CEST)
- Postal codes: 400 02, 403 32
- Website: www.povrly.cz

Povrly (German: Pömmerle or Pömerle) is a municipality and village in Ústí nad Labem District in the Ústí nad Labem Region of the Czech Republic. It has about 2,300 inhabitants.

== Administrative division ==
Povrly consists of five municipal parts (in brackets population according to the 2021 census):

- Povrly (1,338)
- Mírkov (99)
- Neštědice (628)
- Roztoky (117)
- Slavošov (33)

== Etymology ==
The name Povrly is derived from the Old Czech adjective povrlý ('grumpy', 'angry'). It was a village of grumpy/angry people.

== Geography ==
Povrly is located about 8 kilometres (5 mi) east of Ústí nad Labem. It lies in Central Bohemian Uplands and in the České středohoří Protected Landscape Area. The highest point is the hill Slavošov at 594 m (1,949 ft) above sea level. The municipality is situated on the left bank of the Elbe River.

== History ==
The first written mention of Povrly is from 1186. For centuries, it belonged to the Děčín estate.

== Demographics ==
Historical population

Year	Pop.	±%
1869	1,875	—
1880	1,808	−3.6%
1890	2,068	+14.4%
1900	2,340	+13.2%
1910	2,852	+21.9%

Year	Pop.	±%
1921	2,863	+0.4%
1930	3,315	+15.8%
1950	2,473	−25.4%
1961	2,351	−4.9%
1970	2,419	+2.9%

Year	Pop.	±%
1980	2,555	+5.6%
1991	2,146	−16.0%
2001	2,109	−1.7%
2011	2,176	+3.2%
2021	2,215	+1.8%

Source: Censuses

== Economy ==
There is a copper factory in Povrly, today known as Povrly Copper Industries. It was founded in 1899.

== Transport ==
The I/62 road (part of the European route E442) from Ústí nad Labem to Děčín runs through the municipality.

Povrly is located on the railway line Děčín–Kadaň. The municipality is served by three train stations and stops: Povrly, Povrly-Roztoky and Neštědice.

== Sights ==
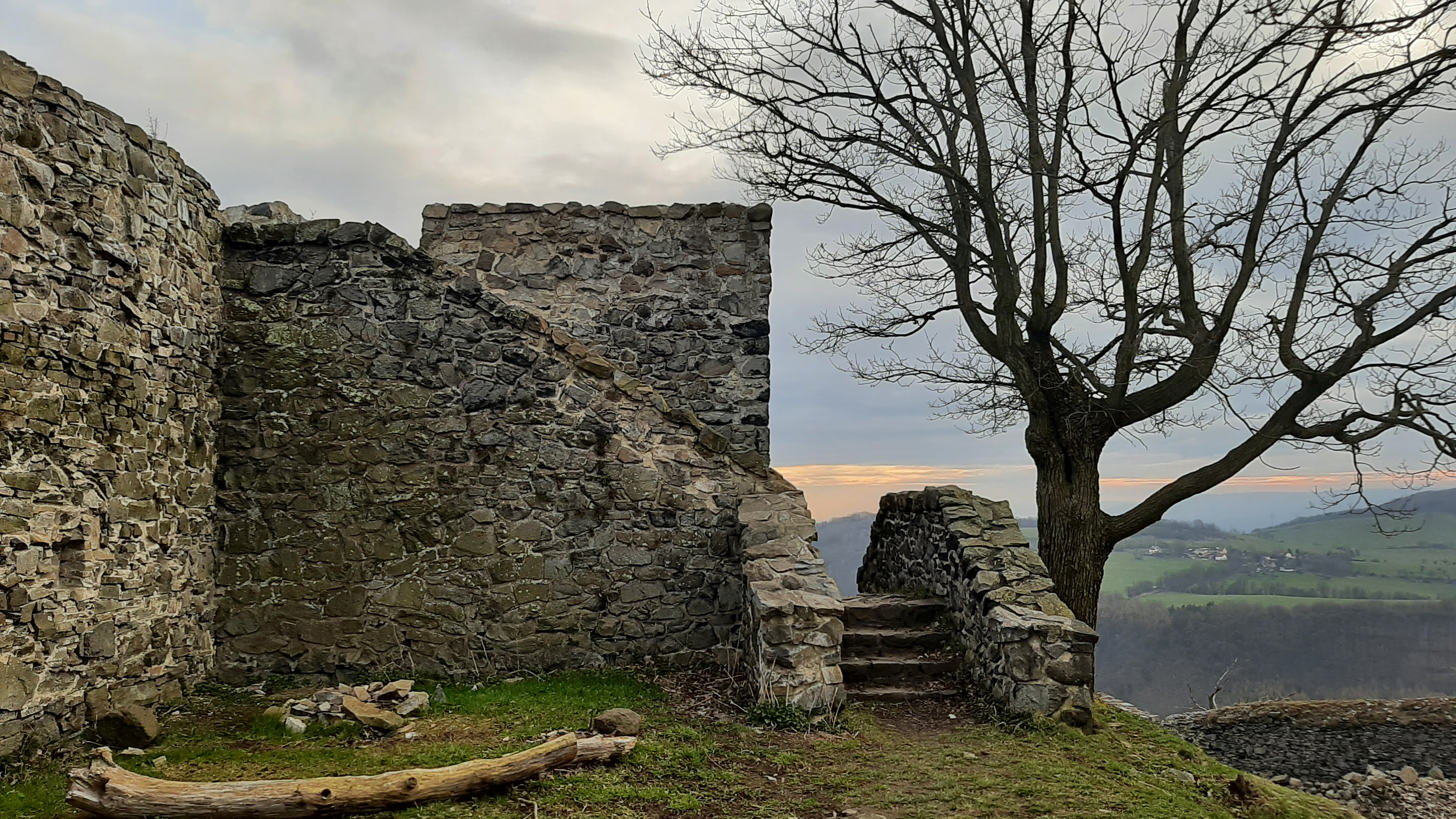
Blansko Castle

In the centre of Povrly is the Church of the Nativity of the Virgin Mary. It is a modern church, built in 1936.

A historical landmark is the Church of the Nativity of Saint John the Baptist in Roztoky. It was built in 1875 on the site of an older late Baroque church. It is an architecturally atypical church built in the late Neoclassical style using Neo-Gothic and Neo-Romanesque elements.

On the hill Blansko near Mírkov is the ruin of the Blansko Castle. It was first documented in 1401. In the 16th century, it lost its residential function. During the Thirty Years' War, it fell into disrepair. Today the ruin is freely accessible.
