= Habrovany (Ústí nad Labem District) =

- Municipality
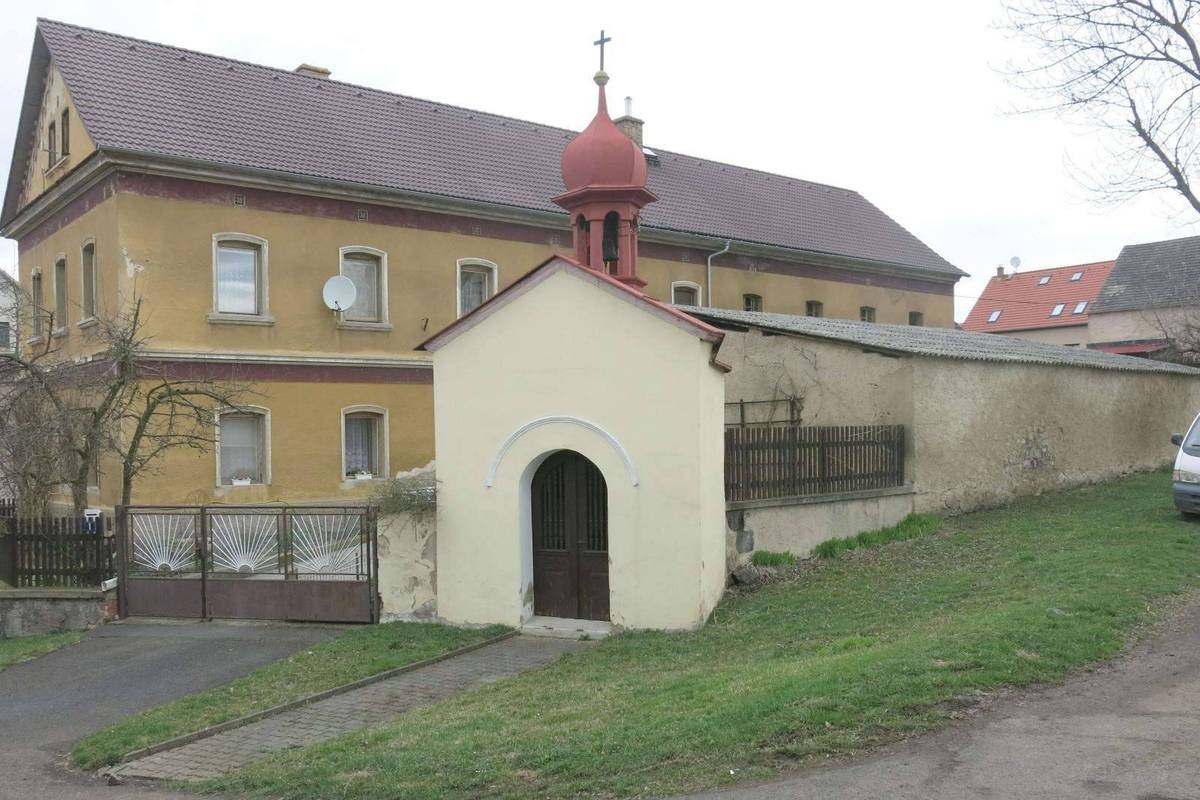
- Chapel of the Virgin Mary

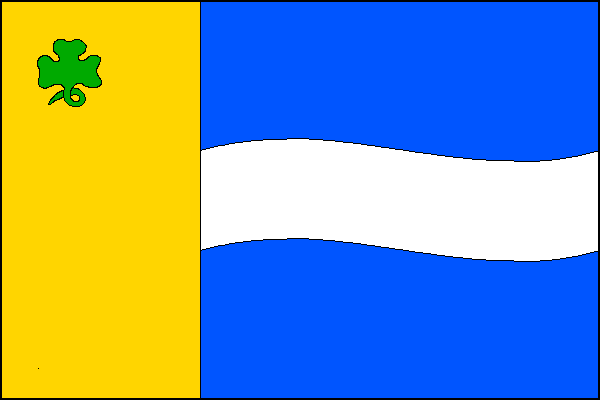
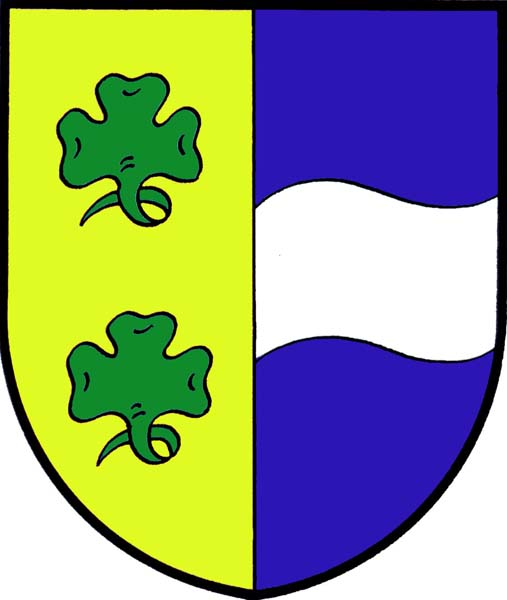
- Flag Coat of arms

- Location in the Czech Republic
- Coordinates: 50°35′55″N 13°58′54″E
- Country: Czech Republic
- Region: Ústí nad Labem
- District: Ústí nad Labem
- First mentioned: 1542

Area
  - Total: 2.82 km^{2} (1.09 sq mi)
- Elevation: 238 m (781 ft)

Population (2026-01-01)
  - Total: 221
  - Density: 78.4/km^{2} (203/sq mi)
- Time zone: UTC+1 (CET)
  - Summer (DST): UTC+2 (CEST)
- Postal code: 400 02
- Website: www.obechabrovany.cz

Habrovany (German: Habrowan) is a municipality and village in Ústí nad Labem District in the Ústí nad Labem Region of the Czech Republic. It has about 200 inhabitants.

Habrovany lies approximately 8 kilometres (5 mi) south-west of Ústí nad Labem and 65 km (40 mi) north-west of Prague.

== Demographics ==
Historical population
Year	Pop.	±%
1869	270	—
1880	257	−4.8%
1890	237	−7.8%
1900	264	+11.4%
1910	286	+8.3%
1921	266	−7.0%
1930	256	−3.8%
1950	145	−43.4%
1961	119	−17.9%
1970	140	+17.6%
1980	138	−1.4%
1991	177	+28.3%
2001	185	+4.5%
2011	183	−1.1%
2021	206	+12.6%
Source: Censuses
