= Malečov =

- Municipality
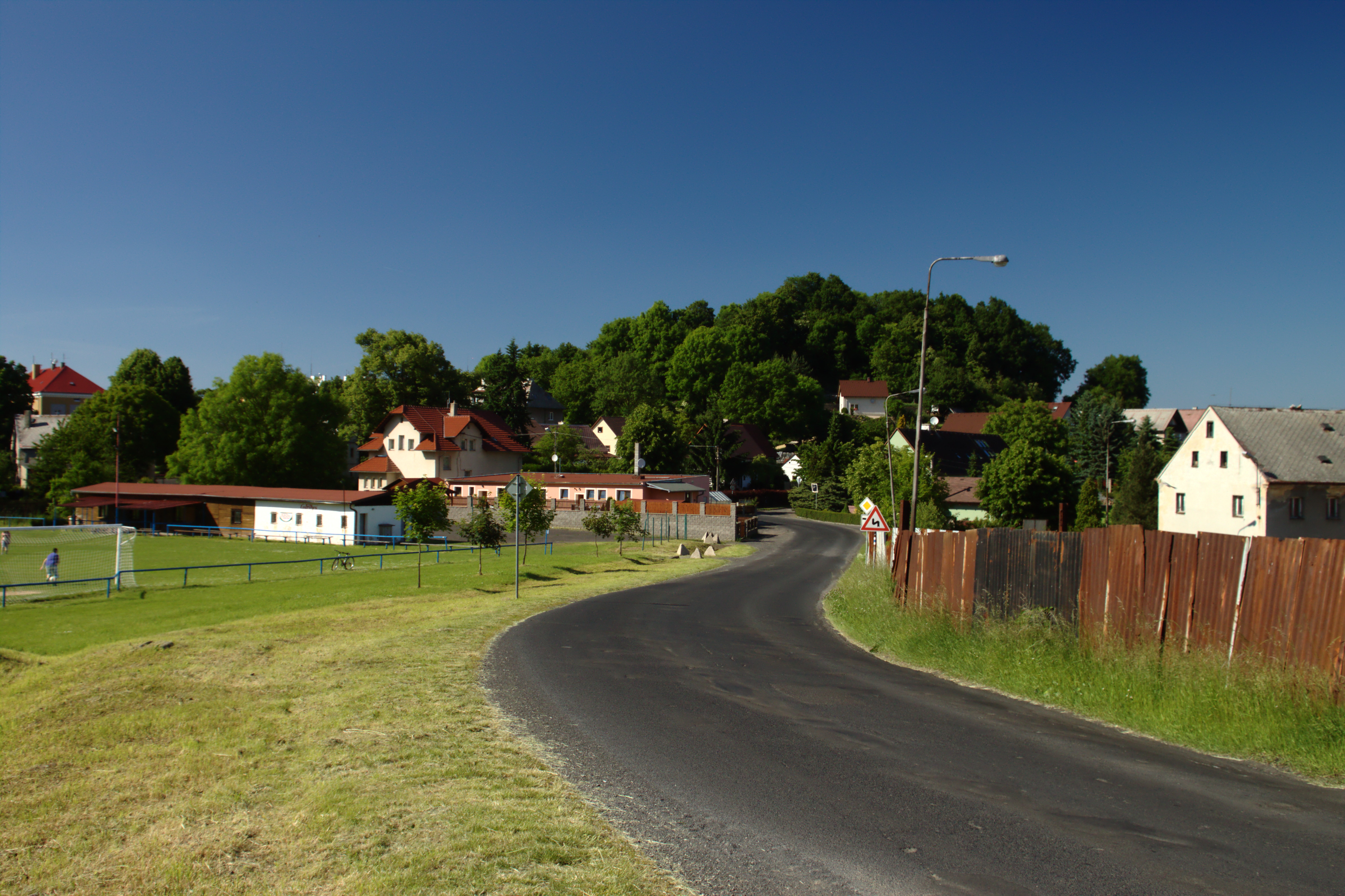
- View of the village

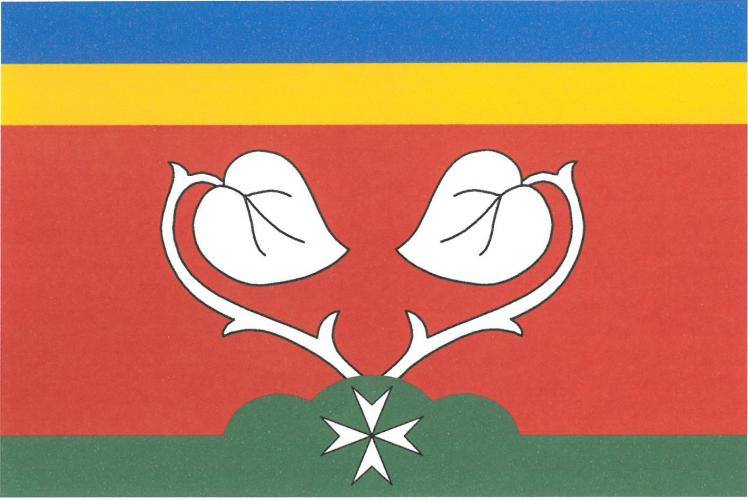
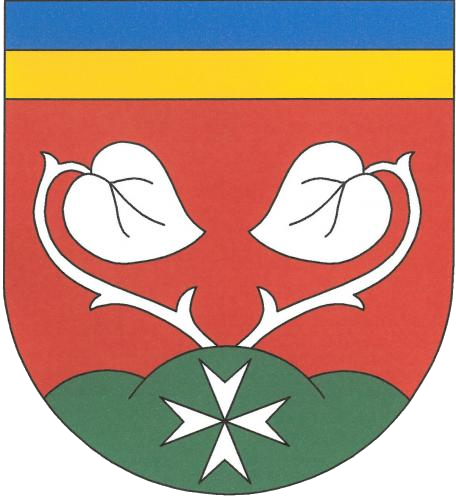
- Flag Coat of arms

- Location in the Czech Republic
- Coordinates: 50°37′55″N 14°7′10″E
- Country: Czech Republic
- Region: Ústí nad Labem
- District: Ústí nad Labem
- First mentioned: 1057

Area
  - Total: 23.68 km^{2} (9.14 sq mi)
- Elevation: 515 m (1,690 ft)

Population (2026-01-01)
  - Total: 863
  - Density: 36.4/km^{2} (94.4/sq mi)
- Time zone: UTC+1 (CET)
  - Summer (DST): UTC+2 (CEST)
- Postal codes: 400 02, 403 27
- Website: www.malecovsko.cz

Malečov (German: Malschen) is a municipality and village in Ústí nad Labem District in the Ústí nad Labem Region of the Czech Republic. It has about 900 inhabitants.

Malečov lies approximately 7 kilometres (4 mi) south-east of Ústí nad Labem and 65 km (40 mi) north of Prague.

== Administrative division ==
Malečov consists of ten municipal parts (in brackets population according to the 2021 census):

- Malečov (366)
- Babiny I (3)
- Březí (115)
- Čeřeniště (82)
- Horní Zálezly (44)
- Němčí (22)
- Pohoří (41)
- Proboštov (67)
- Řetouň (24)
- Rýdeč (87)

== Demographics ==
Historical population
Year	Pop.	±%
1869	1,870	—
1880	1,755	−6.1%
1890	1,787	+1.8%
1900	1,782	−0.3%
1910	1,686	−5.4%
1921	1,652	−2.0%
1930	1,711	+3.6%
1950	634	−62.9%
1961	485	−23.5%
1970	490	+1.0%
1980	552	+12.7%
1991	499	−9.6%
2001	598	+19.8%
2011	735	+22.9%
2021	851	+15.8%
Source: Censuses
