= Týniště (Plzeň-South District) =

- Municipality
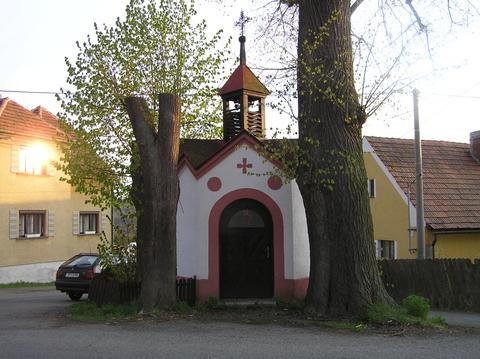
- Chapel in Týniště

- Location in the Czech Republic
- Coordinates: 49°31′16″N 13°25′3″E
- Country: Czech Republic
- Region: Plzeň
- District: Plzeň-South
- First mentioned: 1379

Area
  - Total: 8.09 km^{2} (3.12 sq mi)
- Elevation: 530 m (1,740 ft)

Population (2026-01-01)
  - Total: 52
  - Density: 6.4/km^{2} (17/sq mi)
- Time zone: UTC+1 (CET)
  - Summer (DST): UTC+2 (CEST)
- Postal code: 334 01
- Website: www.obec-tyniste.cz

Týniště is a municipality and village in Plzeň-South District in the Plzeň Region of the Czech Republic. It has about 50 inhabitants.

== Etymology ==
The name has its root in the Old Czech words týn (related to English 'town'), meaning 'fortified settlement', and tyniště, meaning 'fortified place'.

== Geography ==
Týniště is located about 23 km (14 mi) south of Plzeň. It lies in the Švihov Highlands. The highest point is the hill Stará pec at 589 m (1,932 ft) above sea level. The stream Zlatý potok originates here and flows across the municipality.

== History ==
The first written mention of Týniště is from 1379. Until 1542, the village was also called Pustá. The owners of the village often changed and included various noblemen. In 1740, Týniště was annexed to the Žinkovy estate.

From 1961 to 1990, Týniště was a municipal part of Horšice. Since 1 September 1990, the municipality has been independent.

== Demographics ==
Historical population

Year	Pop.	±%
1869	183	—
1880	172	−6.0%
1890	159	−7.6%
1900	142	−10.7%
1910	150	+5.6%

Year	Pop.	±%
1921	182	+21.3%
1930	168	−7.7%
1950	105	−37.5%
1961	106	+1.0%
1970	80	−24.5%

Year	Pop.	±%
1980	61	−23.8%
1991	57	−6.6%
2001	49	−14.0%
2011	47	−4.1%
2021	43	−8.5%

Source: Censuses

== Transport ==
There are no railways or major roads passing through the municipality.

== Sights ==
There are no protected cultural monuments in the municipality. In the centre of Týniště is a small chapel.
