= Most Basin =

Geomorphological region in the Czech Republic

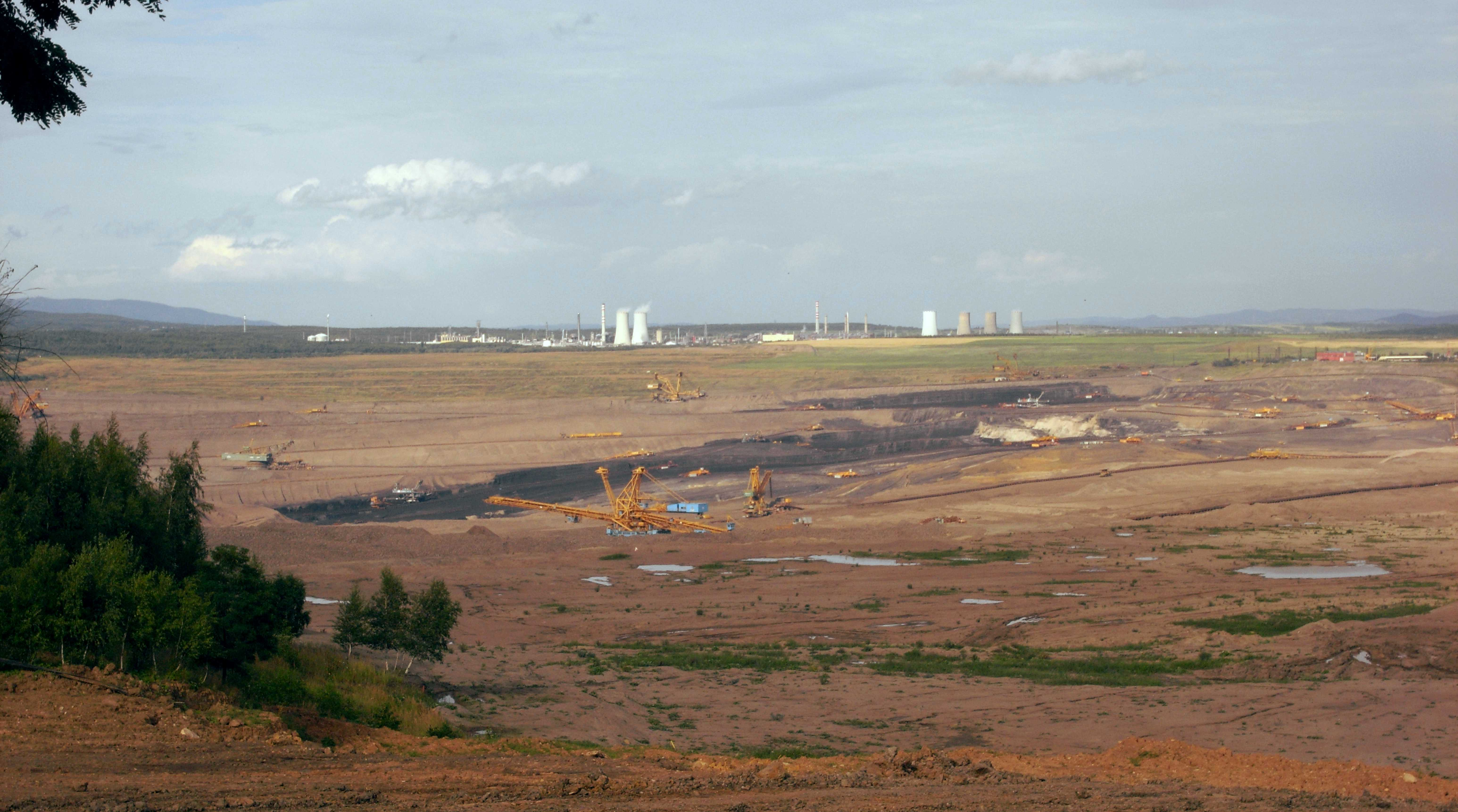
- Lignite mine below Jezeří Castle

Highest point
- Peak: A contour line near Libouchec
- Elevation: 450 m (1,480 ft)

Dimensions
- Length: 80 km (50 mi)
- Area: 1,111 km^{2} (429 mi^{2})

Geography
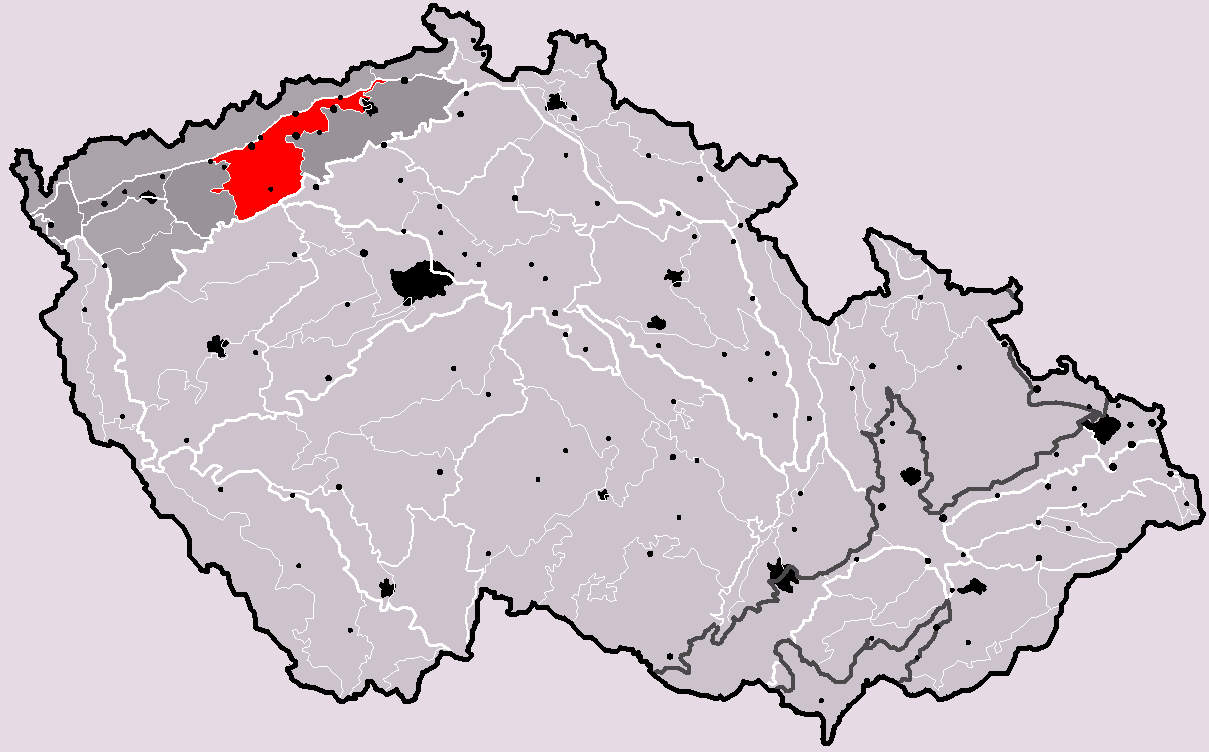
- Most Basin in the geomorphological system of the Czech Republic
- Country: Czech Republic
- Regions: Ústí nad Labem
- Range coordinates: 15°30′N 13°30′E
- Parent range: Podkrušnohorská Macroregion

The Most Basin (also known as North Bohemian Basin; Czech: Mostecká pánev, German: Nordböhmisches Becken) is a structural basin and geomorphological mesoregion of the Czech Republic. It is named after the city of Most. It forms the southwestern and central parts of the Ústí nad Labem Region. It is among the richest European deposits of lignite, which has been extracted here since the second half of 19th century, mostly by extensive surface mining.

== Geomorphology ==
The Most Basin is a mesoregion of the Podkrušnohorská Macroregion within the Bohemian Massif. It is further subdivided into the microregions of Žatec Basin and Chomutov-Teplice Basin.

A flat landscape without peaks is typical for the Most Basin. The highest point of the territory is a contour line near Libouchec, at 450 metres (1,480 ft) above sea level. There are several low hills with an elevation of 350–380 in the southwestern part of the basin.

=== Adjacent landscapes ===
The basin lies between the Central and Eastern Ore Mountains to the north and the Rakovník Uplands to the south. To the east the basin borders on the Central Bohemian Uplands and the foothills of Elbe Sandstone Mountains as well as in the southeast on the geomorphological region of the Lower Ohře Table. In the west it reaches the Doupov Mountains.

== Geology ==
The Most Basin is a depression filled with Tertiary sediments. Its main filling is of Miocene age and they are mainly volcanic rocks, pyroclastic sediments, clays and sands together with important deposits of lignite and ceramic clays.

== Geography ==
The Most Basin has an area of 1,111 square kilometres (429 sq mi) and an average elevation of 272 metres (892 ft). The territory has an elongated shape from southwest to northeast.

There are several significant watercourses in the area. The largest rivers are Ohře and Bílina. The area is rich on reservoirs and artificial lakes as a consequence of land reclamation after coal mining. The largest bodies of water are lakes Milada, Most and Matylda, and the Nechranice Reservoir.

Natural conditions have given rise to larger settlements in the area. The largest cities and towns in the Most Basin are Chomutov, Litvínov, Jirkov, Žatec and Krupka. Partly located in the territory are Ústí nad Labem, Most, Teplice, Kadaň and Bílina.

== Economy ==
The basin is known for lignite mining. 30–40 thousand tonnes of coal are mined here every year.

The region is largely agricultural. The area around Žatec is well known for hops cultivation. Saaz hops or Žatec hops is a protected designation of origin.

== Gallery ==
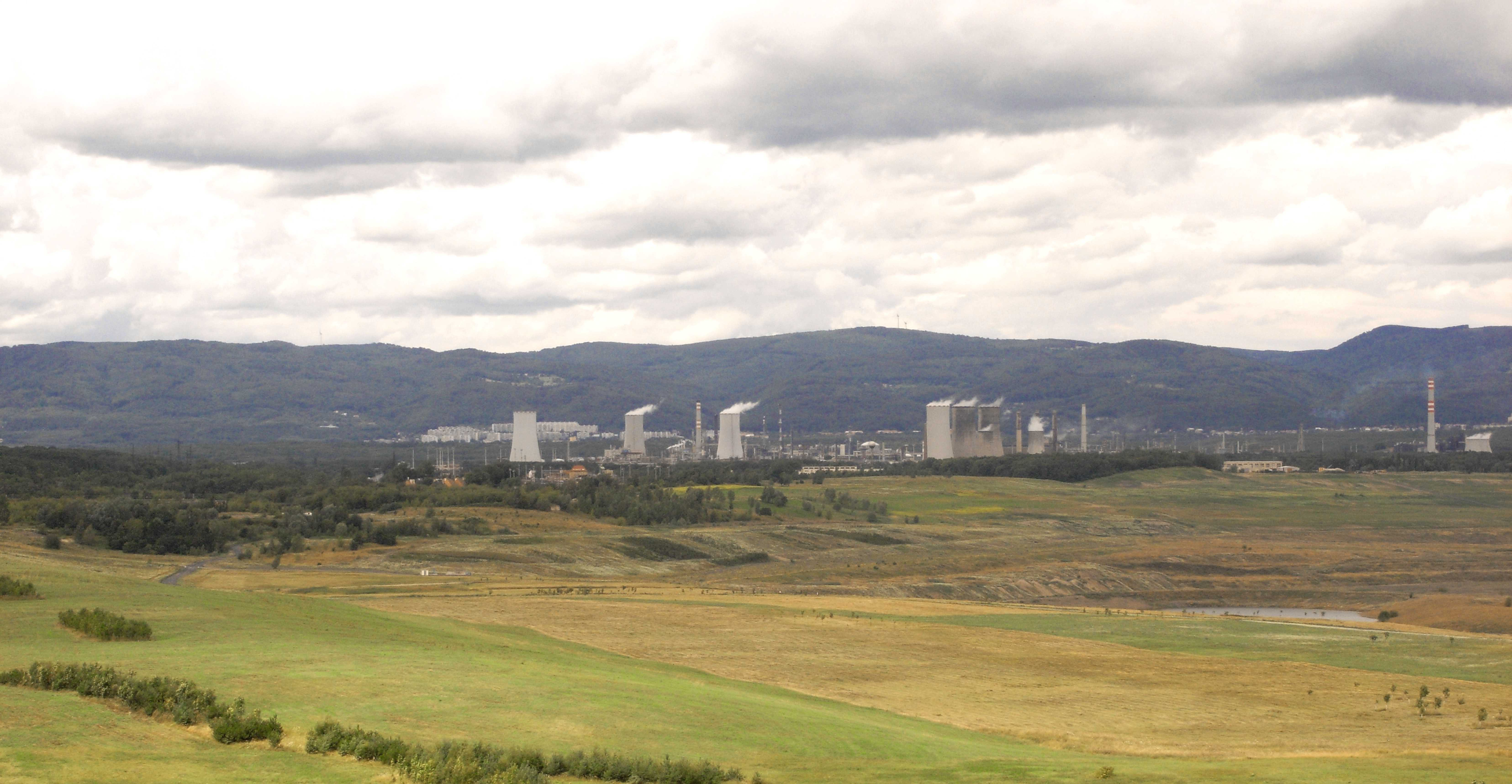
Infilling a mine near Most. In the foreground: the site of the old town

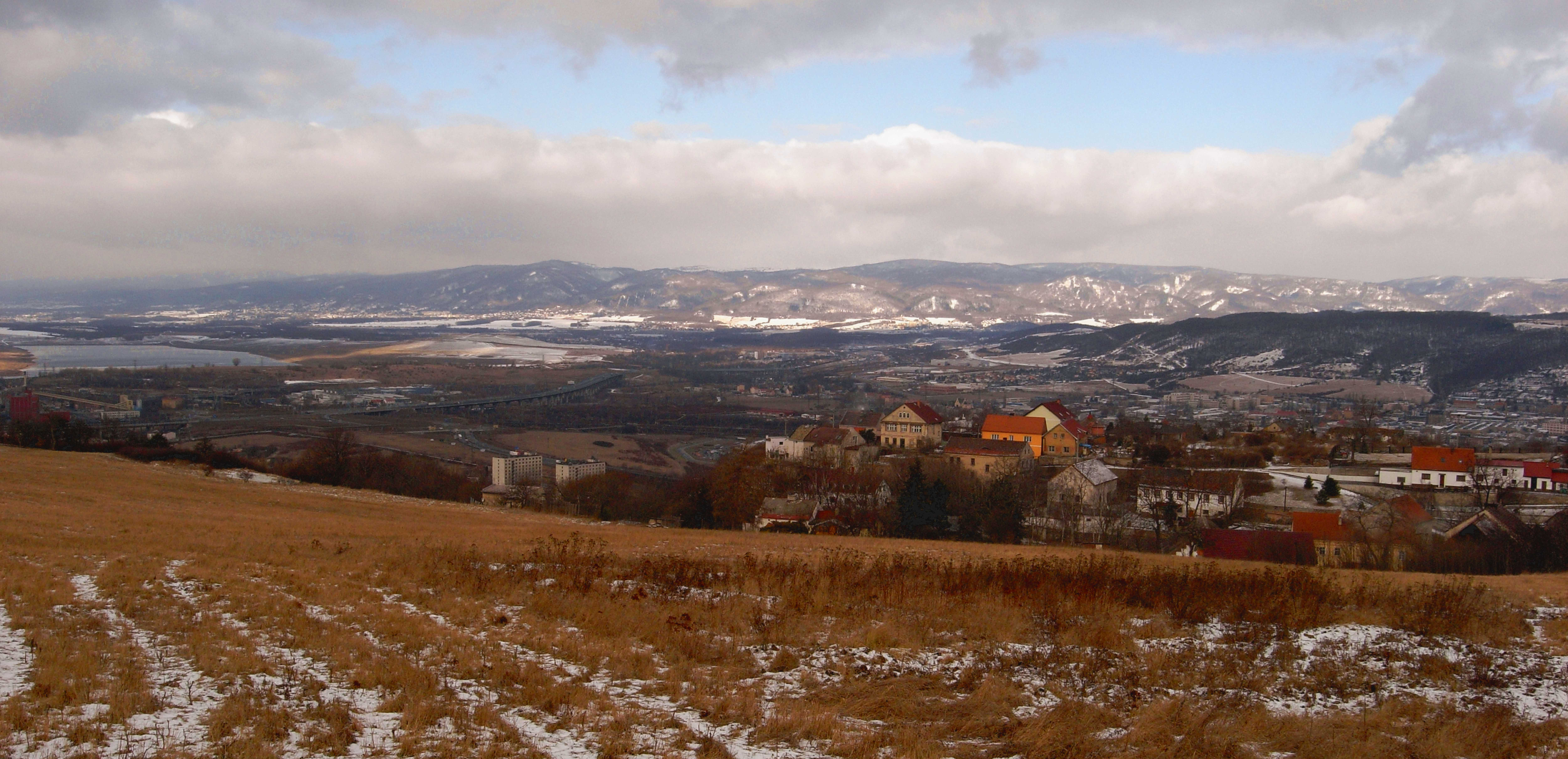
The Most Basin between Ústí nad Labem (right) with view of the escarpment of the Ore Mountain fault-block

== See also ==
- Energy in the Czech Republic
