= Zubrnice =

- Municipality
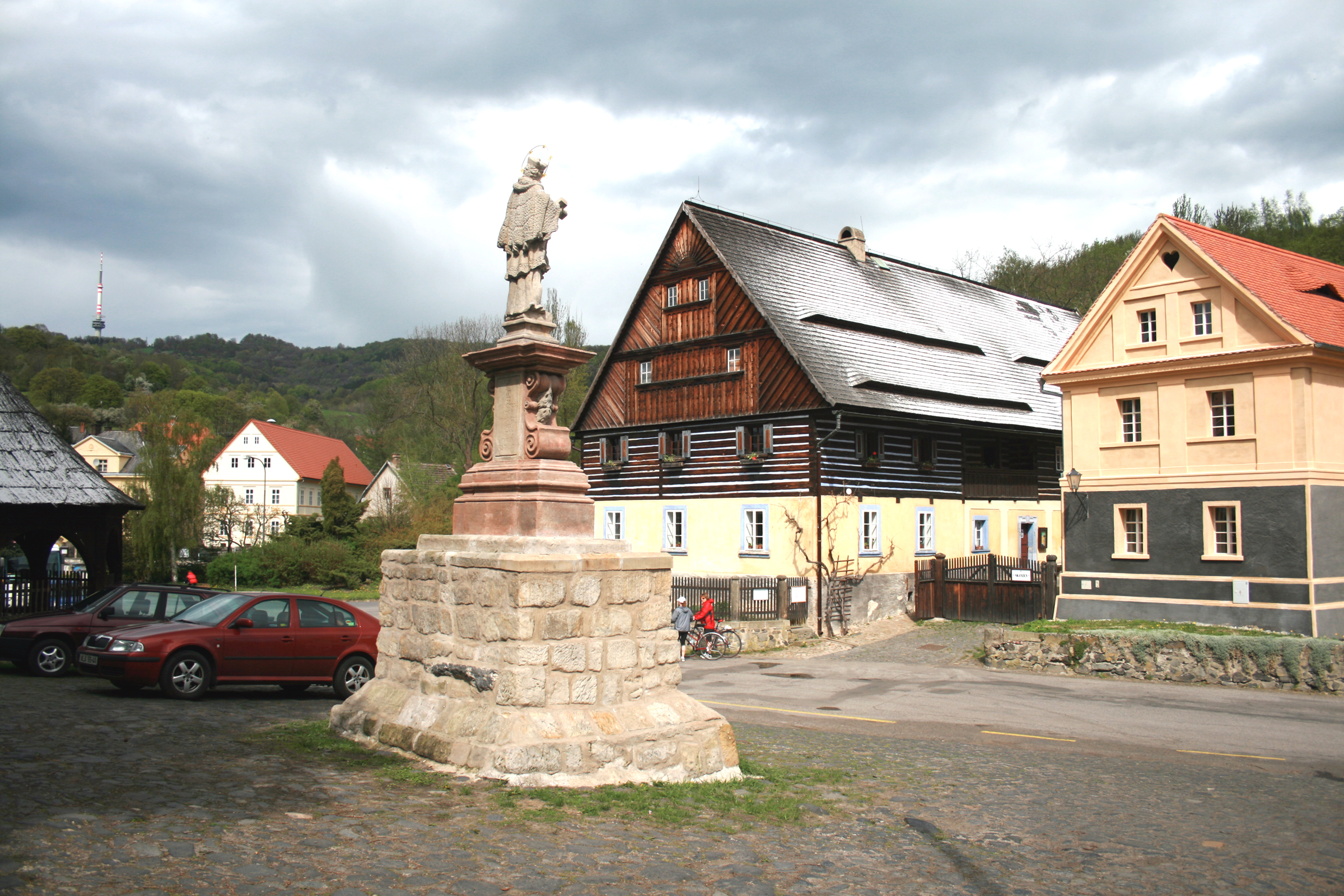
- Centre of Zubnice

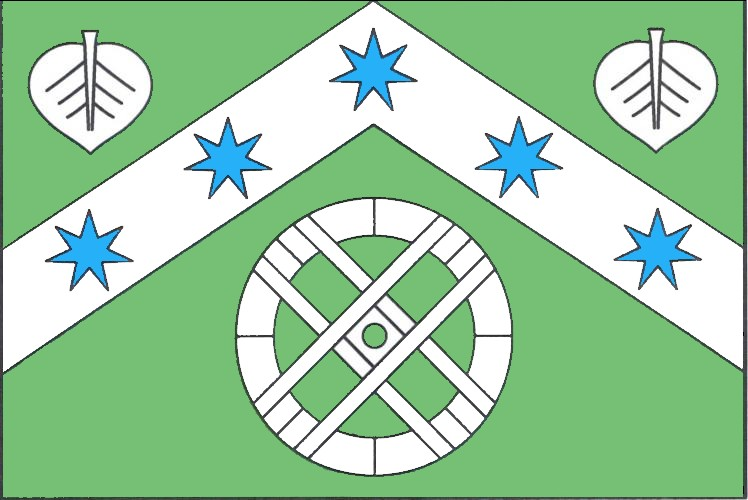
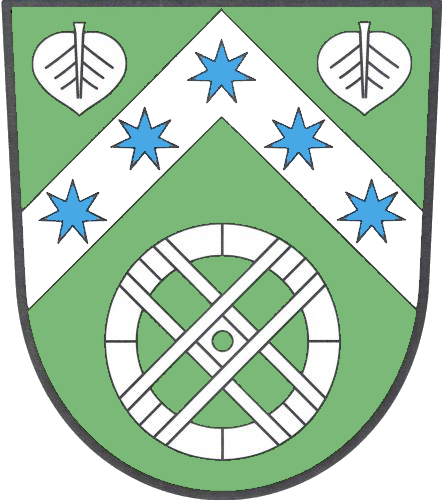
- Flag Coat of arms

- Location in the Czech Republic
- Coordinates: 50°38′58″N 14°13′14″E
- Country: Czech Republic
- Region: Ústí nad Labem
- District: Ústí nad Labem
- First mentioned: 1352

Area
  - Total: 6.74 km^{2} (2.60 sq mi)
- Elevation: 290 m (950 ft)

Population (2026-01-01)
  - Total: 223
  - Density: 33.1/km^{2} (85.7/sq mi)
- Time zone: UTC+1 (CET)
  - Summer (DST): UTC+2 (CEST)
- Postal code: 400 02
- Website: www.obeczubrnice.cz

Zubrnice (German: Saubernitz) is a municipality and village in Ústí nad Labem District in the Ústí nad Labem Region of the Czech Republic. It has about 200 inhabitants. The folk architecture in the village is well preserved and is protected as a village monument reservation.

== Administrative division ==
Zubrnice consists of two municipal parts (in brackets population according to the 2021 census):

- Zubrnice (167)
- Týniště (63)

== Etymology ==
The name Zubrnice is most likely derived from zubr (i.e. 'European bison'). It first appeared as Zubrnycz.

== Geography ==
Zubrnice is located about 12 kilometres (7 mi) east of Ústí nad Labem. It lies in the Central Bohemian Uplands. The highest point is at 659 m (2,162 ft) above sea level. The entire municipal territory lies within the České středohoří Protected Landscape Area.

== History ==
The first written mention of Zubrnice is from 1352, when the church was mentioned. With a short break after the Hussite Wars, when Zubrnice was acquired by Jan of Vartenberk, the village was owned by the bishopric in Litoměřice continuously until 1848.

== Demographics ==
Historical population

Year	Pop.	±%
1869	645	—
1880	724	+12.2%
1890	764	+5.5%
1900	659	−13.7%
1910	654	−0.8%

Year	Pop.	±%
1921	638	−2.4%
1930	693	+8.6%
1950	317	−54.3%
1961	330	+4.1%
1970	318	−3.6%

Year	Pop.	±%
1980	254	−20.1%
1991	161	−36.6%
2001	207	+28.6%
2011	209	+1.0%
2021	230	+10.0%

Source: Censuses

== Transport ==
Zubrnice is the terminus and start of a railway line from/to Ústí nad Labem, but trains run on it only on weekends.

== Sights ==
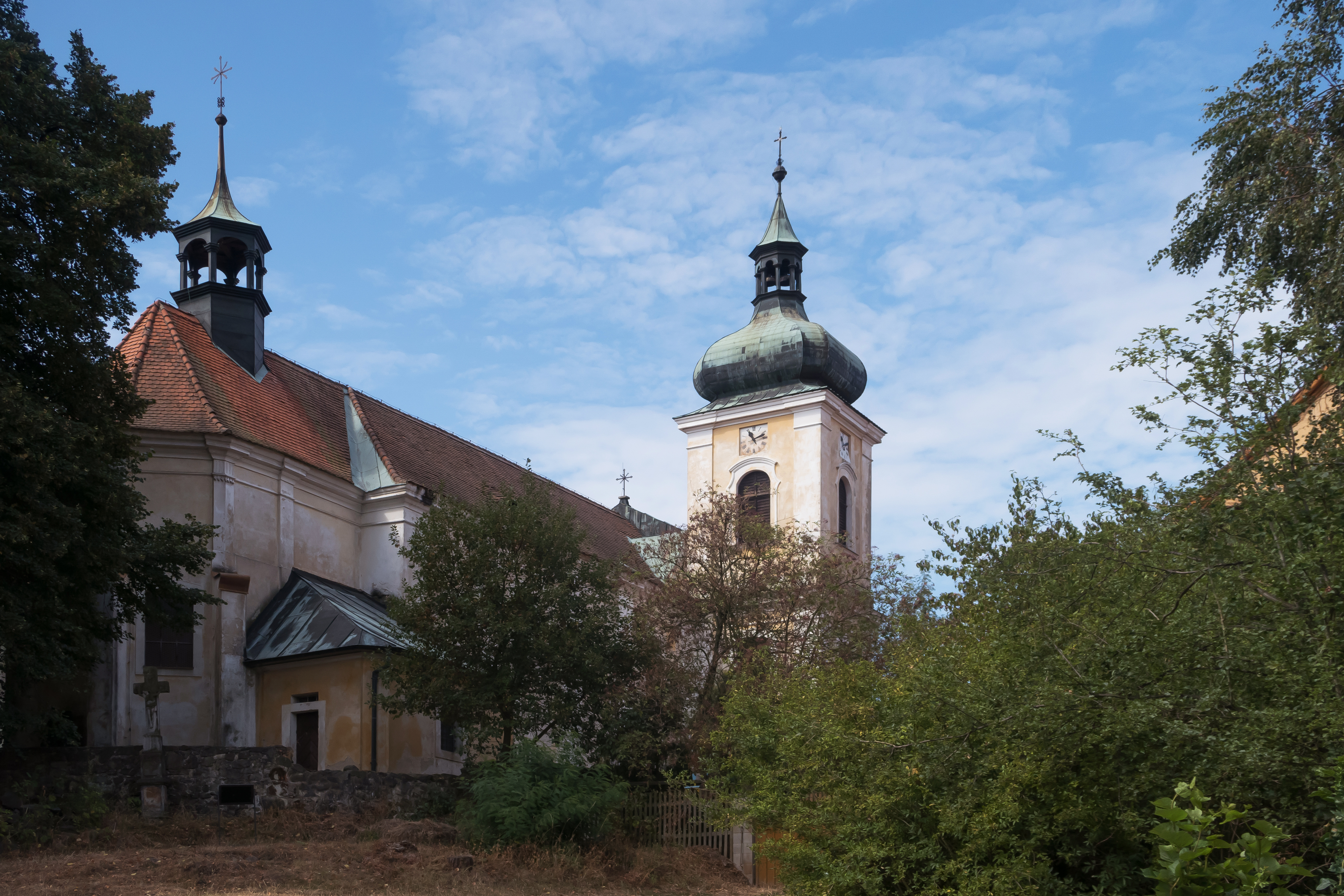
Church of Saint Mary Magdalene

Zubrnice is known for it Museum in Nature with a set of valuable buildings of folk architecture, consisting of timbered, half-timbered and brick buildings. The Baroque well in the centre dates from 1695.

The Church of Saint Mary Magdalene is as old as the village. In 1723–1732, it was rebuilt in the Baroque style.
