= Telnice (Ústí nad Labem District) =

- Municipality
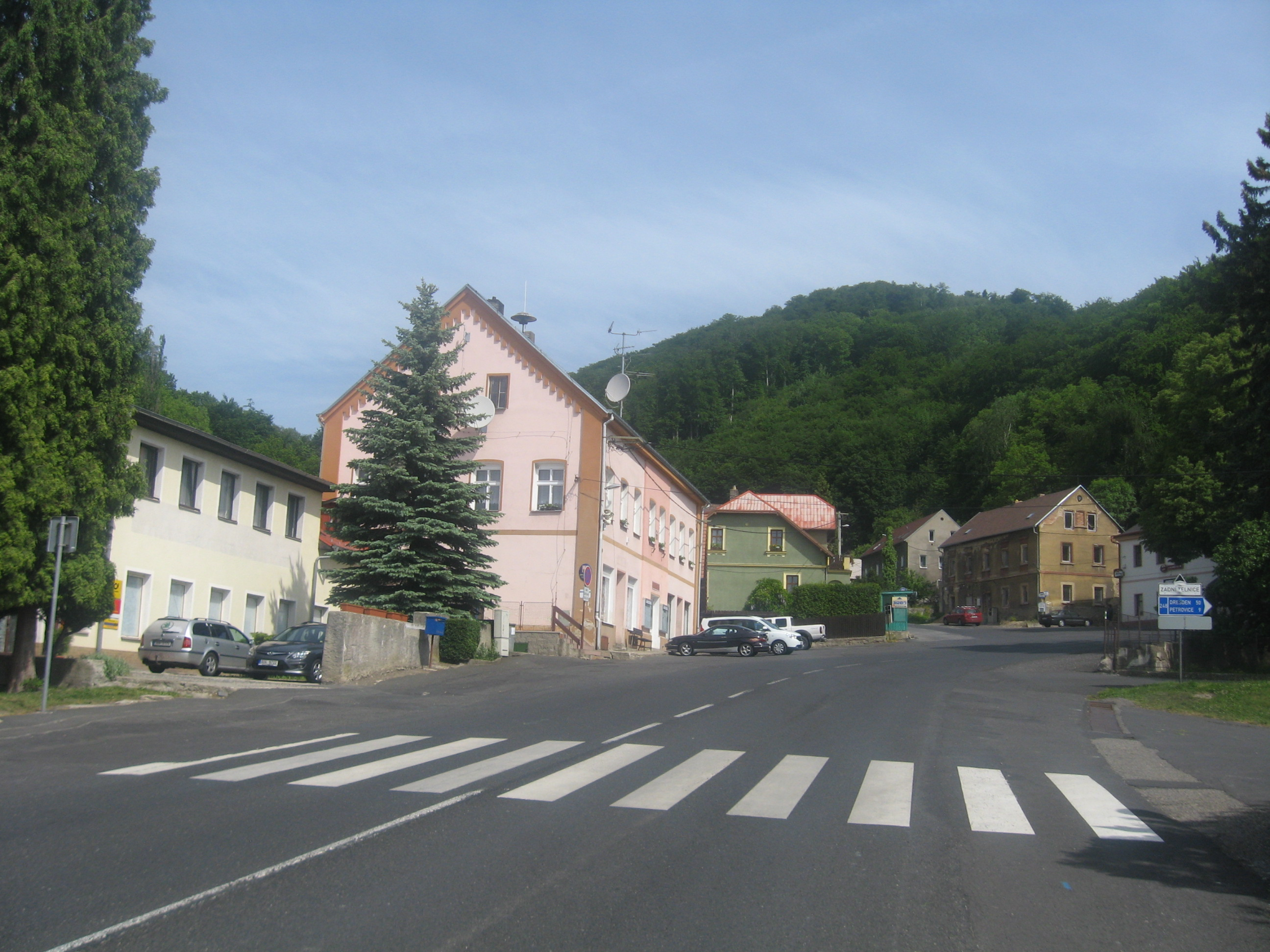
- Centre of Telnice

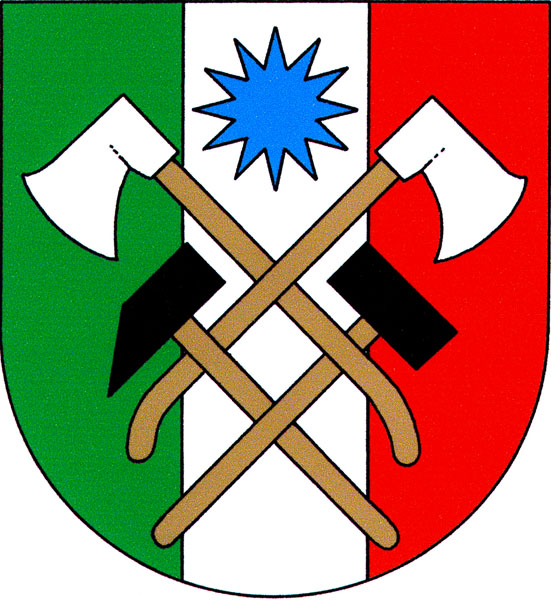
- Flag Coat of arms

- Location in the Czech Republic
- Coordinates: 50°43′59″N 13°57′28″E
- Country: Czech Republic
- Region: Ústí nad Labem
- District: Ústí nad Labem
- First mentioned: 1547

Area
  - Total: 11.32 km^{2} (4.37 sq mi)
- Elevation: 345 m (1,132 ft)

Population (2026-01-01)
  - Total: 704
  - Density: 62.2/km^{2} (161/sq mi)
- Time zone: UTC+1 (CET)
  - Summer (DST): UTC+2 (CEST)
- Postal code: 403 38
- Website: www.obec-telnice.cz

Telnice (German: Tellnitz) is a municipality and village in Ústí nad Labem District in the Ústí nad Labem Region of the Czech Republic. It has about 700 inhabitants.

Telnice lies approximately 12 kilometres (7 mi) north-west of Ústí nad Labem and 80 km (50 mi) north-west of Prague.

== Administrative division ==
Telnice consists of three municipal parts (in brackets population according to the 2021 census):

- Telnice (222)
- Liboňov (75)
- Varvažov (392)

== Demographics ==
Historical population
Year	Pop.	±%
1869	1,089	—
1880	1,138	+4.5%
1890	1,032	−9.3%
1900	1,119	+8.4%
1910	1,446	+29.2%
1921	1,617	+11.8%
1930	1,835	+13.5%
1950	1,003	−45.3%
1961	1,082	+7.9%
1970	702	−35.1%
1980	655	−6.7%
1991	515	−21.4%
2001	577	+12.0%
2011	692	+19.9%
2021	689	−0.4%
Source: Censuses
