= Zaječická hořká =

Strongly mineralized natural bitter water

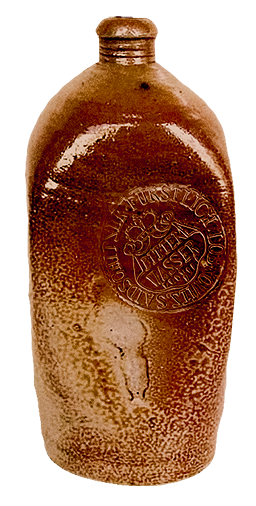
Fürstlich Lobkowitz Saidschitzer Bitter Wasser bottle

Zaječická hořká ("Zaječice's Bitter Water"; German: Saidschitzer Bitterwasser) is strongly mineralized natural bitter water from the village of Zaječice in the Ústí nad Labem Region of the Czech Republic.

== Description ==
Zaječická hořká is known since the 16th century for its purgative and gentle laxative effects. It rises from a wells located in the vicinity of Zaječice, Korozluky and Sedlec (part of Korozluky). It ranks among strongly mineralized mineral waters of the Magnesium sulphate type; it is cool, hypertonic, slightly opalescent, yellowish, scent-free, with a strongly bitter flavour.

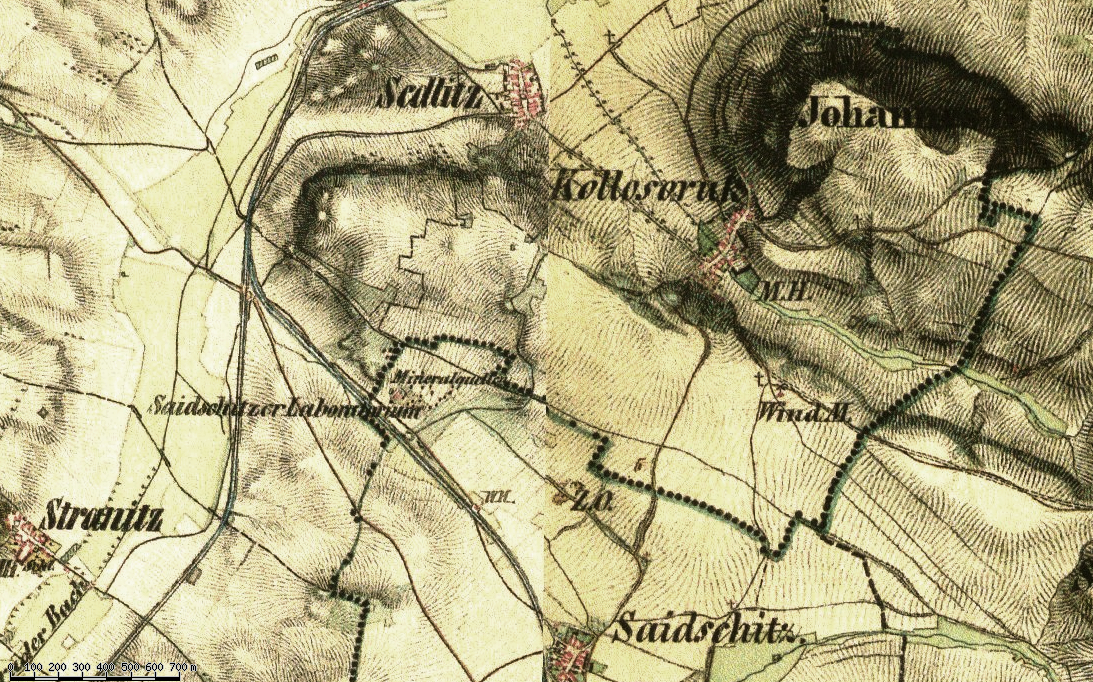
Historical map of Zaječice, Sedlec a Korozluky mineral springs

During the history of the area, bitter waters from Zaječice, (Seidschitz), Sedlec (Sedlitz), Korozluky (Kollosoruk) and Bylany (Püllna) were exported to the whole world as the equivalent of Epsom salt products. Trademarks for different markets were: Zaječická hořká, Seidschitzcher bitter-wasser, Sedlitz bitterwasser, Sedlitz water, Püllna wasser, Pillnaer bitter wasser.

The salt obtained by evaporation were made into "Biliner digestive pastiles". Thanks to the well known curative effects of Zaječická and Sedlická water, end of the 19th century spread "Sedlitz powder" name for a laxative powder, which, however, had nothing to do with "Biliner digestive pastiles". So-called "Sedlitz powder", produced in different laboratories, had different chemical composition and side effects.

== History ==
Zaječická bitter water was from 17th century the House of Lobkowicz at the Spa Bílinská Kyselka in the nearby town Bilina. Water from wells was thickened by evaporation and then filled into glass bottles.

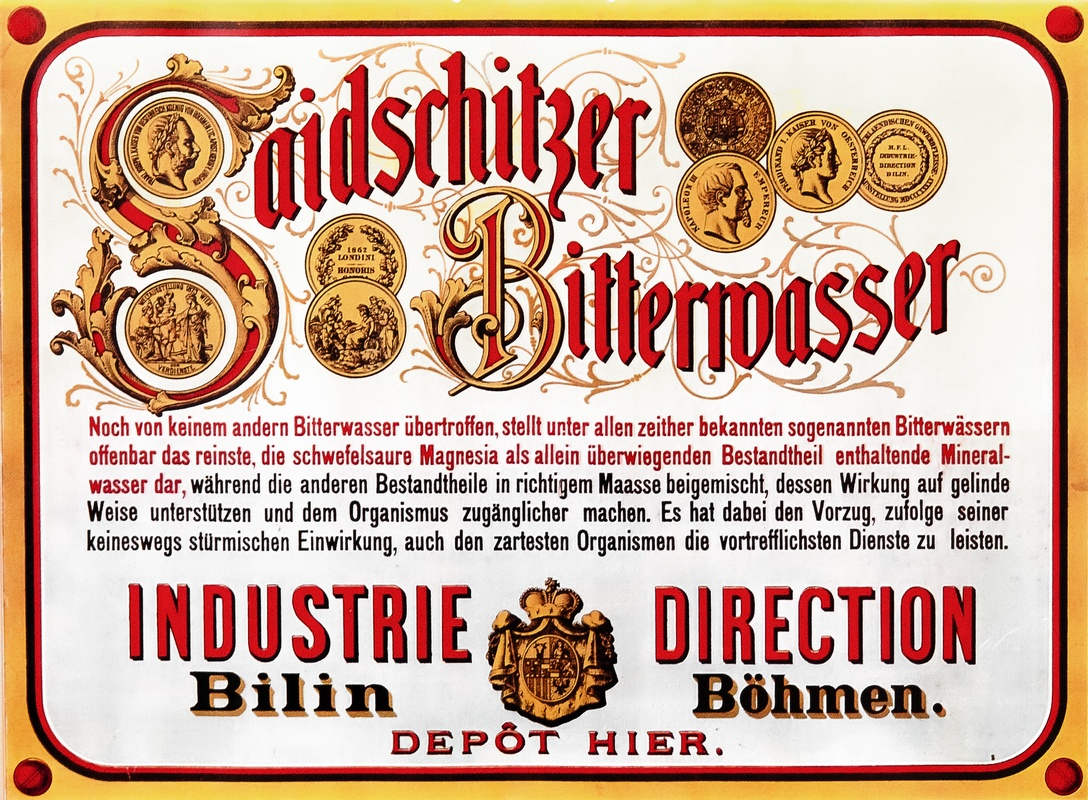
Zaječická hořká historical bottle label Saidschitzer Bitterwasser

The first scientific description of the therapeutic effects of water comes from balneologists Josef von Löschner, Franz Ambrosius Reuss and August Emanuel von Reuss.

== Gallery ==
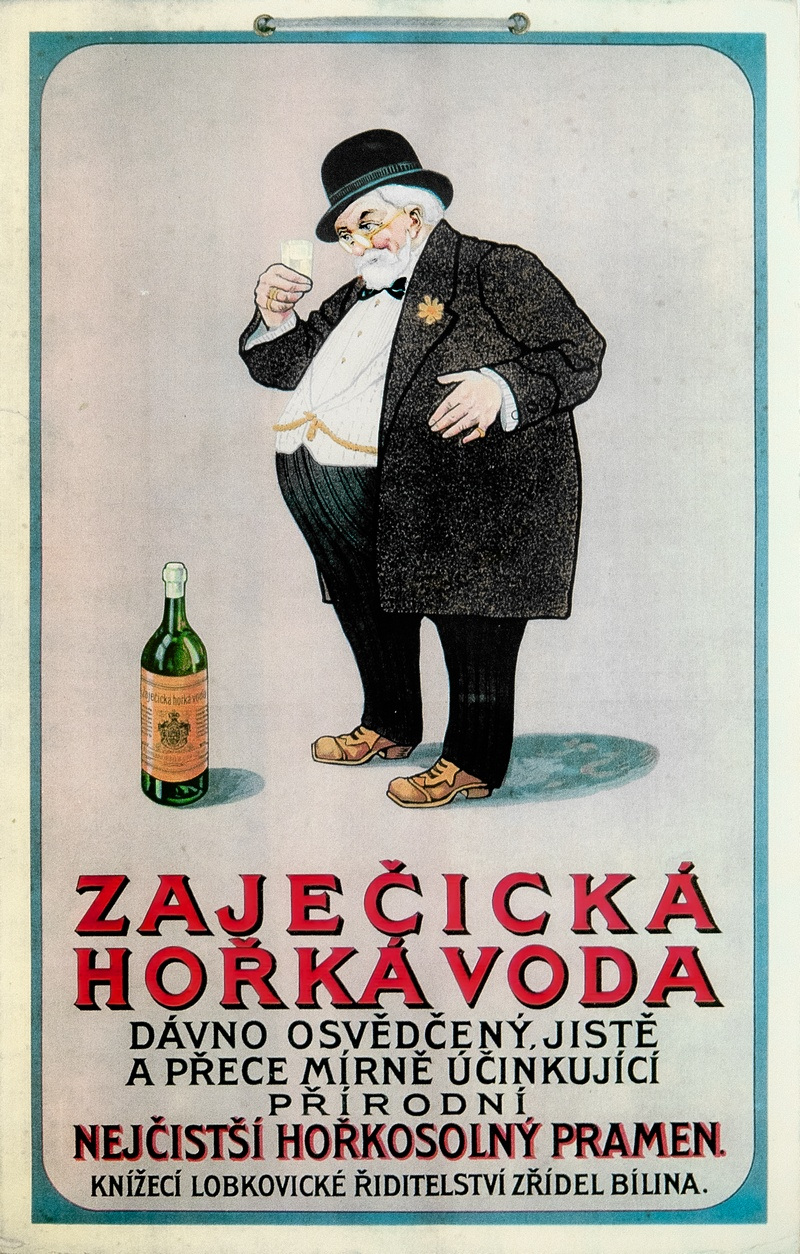
Zaječická hořká historical poster in Czech

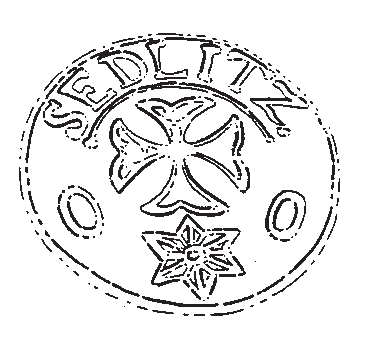
Sedlitz bitter wasser clay pot logo

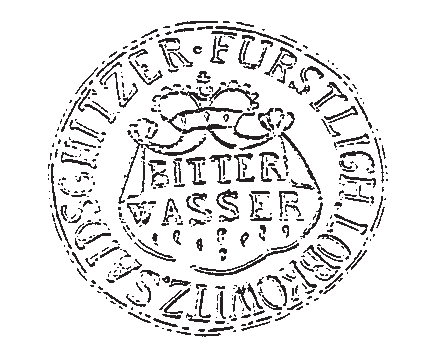
Fürstlich Lobkowitz Saidschitzer Bitter Wasser clay pot logo

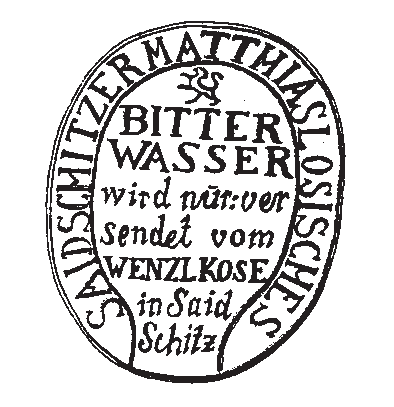
Saidschitzes Mattias Losisches Bitter Wasser clay pot logo

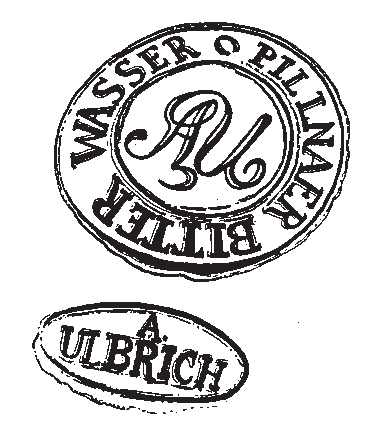
Pillnaer bitter wasser A. Ulbrich clay pot logo
