= Eger Graben =

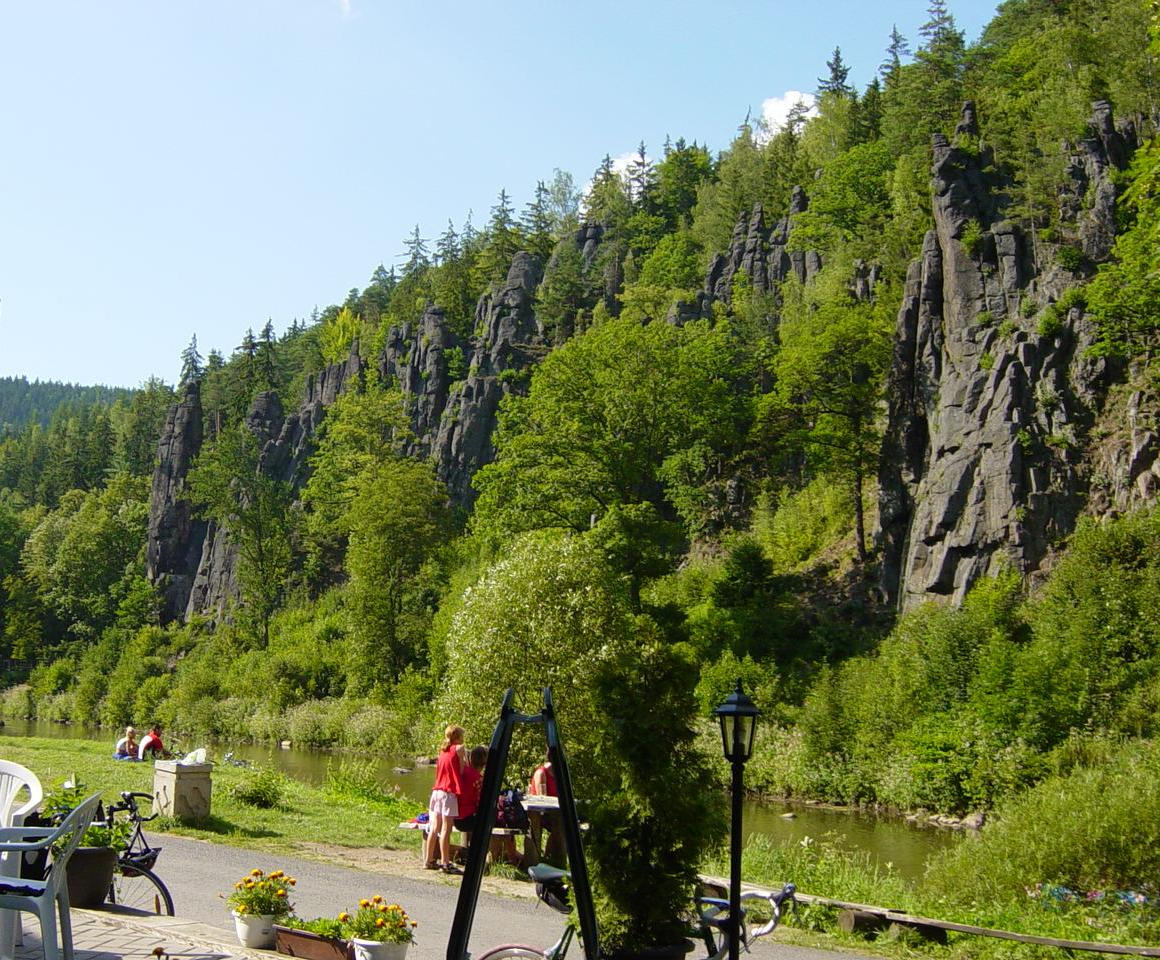
The Hans Heiling Rocks on the Ohře west of Karlovy Vary: Variscan granite of the Bohemian Massif just south of the southern fault line of the graben in the Sokolov Basin.

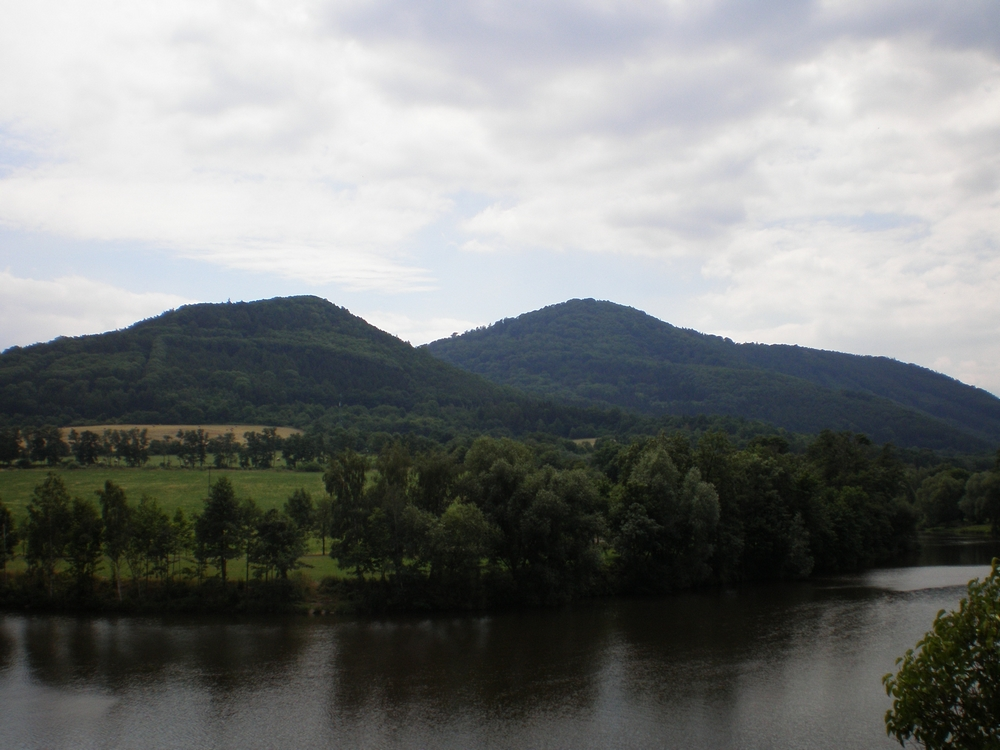
Mravenčák (left) and Černý vrch, two tephrite-basanite kuppen on the northern edge of the Doupov Mountains opposite Klášterec nad Ohří

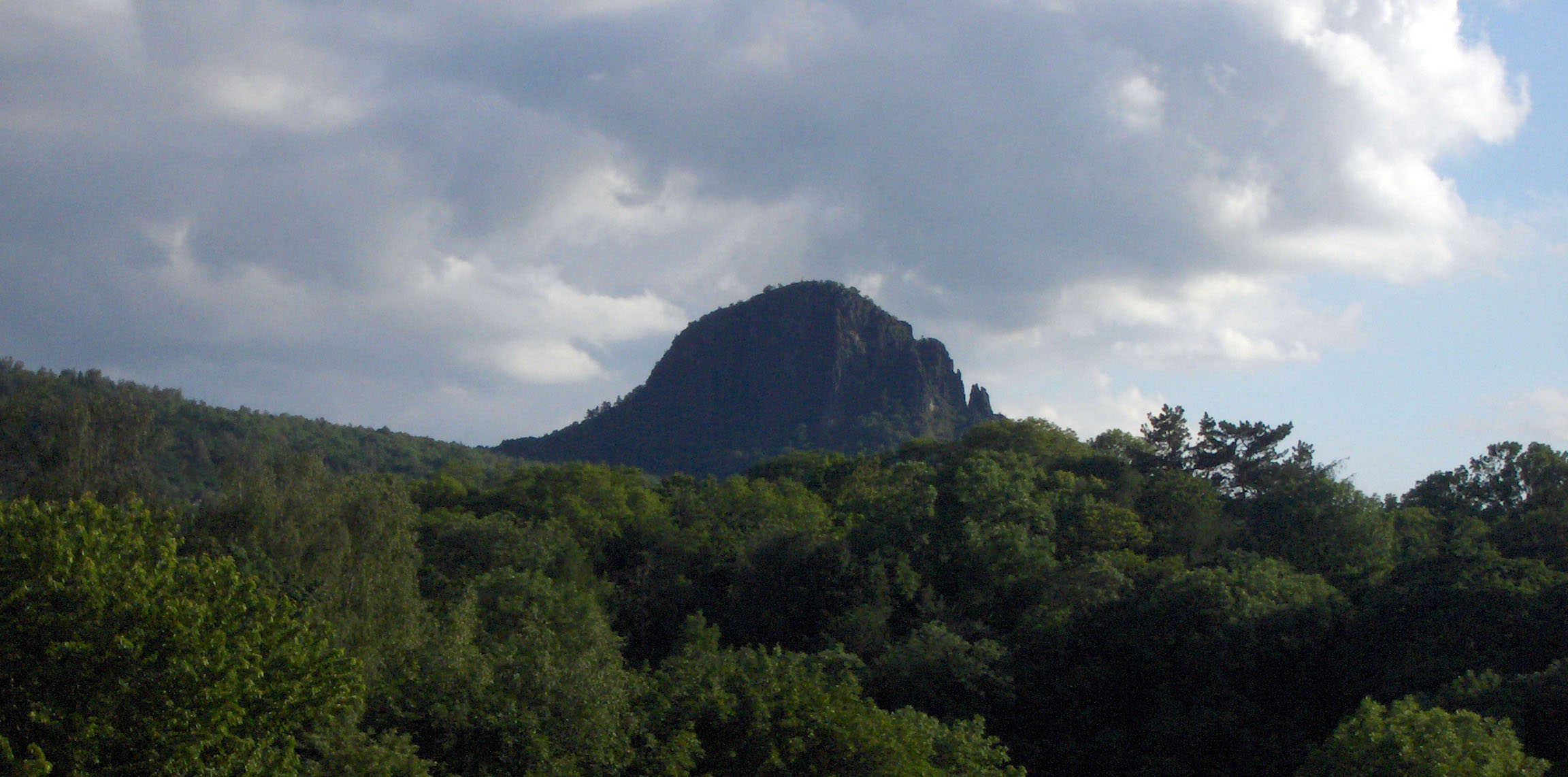
The Bořeň near Bílina, an isolated tephrite-basanite erosion stump on the transition from the Central Bohemian Uplands into the Most Basin

The Eger Graben (also called Ohře Graben; Czech: Oherský rift, German: Egergraben) is a geological structure in the Czech Republic. It runs southwards, parallel to the Ore Mountains and its formation is linked with that of the mountain range.

== Topography ==
The Ohře (also known by its German name Eger, hence the name of the trough) flows through the Eger Graben and separates the Ore Mountains from the Slavkov Forest and the Doupov Mountains. The trench continues to the northeast along the valley of the Bílina and later, as the North Bohemian Basin, separates the Ore Mountains from the Central Bohemian Uplands, where the Ohře River leaves the graben and flows into the Elbe south of the Central Bohemian Uplands.

== Geology ==
The Eger Graben is part of the European Cenozoic Rift System and was created geologically on the same principle as the Rhine Rift Valley. It was formed by the almost complete erosion of the Variscan Mountains and sits on a fault-block caused by the horizontal pressure of the African continental plate. This block dropped, however, in contrast to the surrounding area. The Ore Mountains are fault-block mountains which rise very gently in Germany, but drop very steeply into the Eger Graben. The trench thus follows the main fault line of the Ore Mountains. Researchers believe that a new volcano is in the process of forming and hope to be able to drill holes in the area to better study what they believe is an awakening volcano.

== Sources ==
- P. De`zes*, S.M. Schmid, P.A. Ziegler (2004) Evolution of the European Cenozoic Rift System: interaction of the Alpine and Pyrenean orogens with their foreland lithosphere
- Peter A. Ziegler (1990) Geological atlas of Western and Central Europe, Volume 2
