= Seidlitz powders =

Laxative and digestive

Seidlitz powders is the generic name under which a commonly known laxative and digestion regulator was marketed and sold by numerous manufacturers under names such as "Rexall Seidlitz Powders", particularly in the late 19th and early 20th centuries.

The three ingredients of Seidlitz powders (tartaric acid, potassium sodium tartrate and sodium bicarbonate) were manufactured by chemical factories from the mid-19th century onwards. The name 'Seidlitz powders' ultimately derives from the village of Sedlec in the Czech Republic. See also § Etymology below.

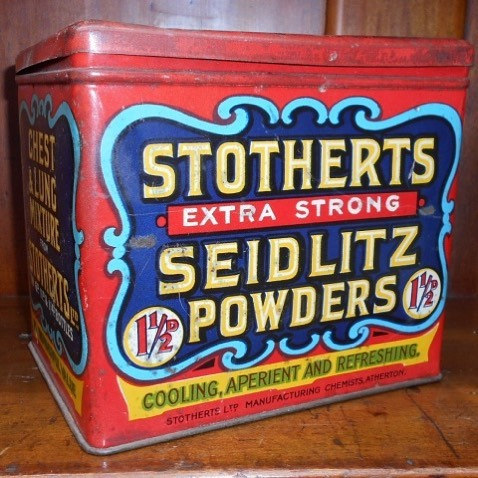
Antique Stothert's Seidlitz Tin

The municipality of Sedlec is also the source of totally unrelated 'Sedlitz bitter water' (see also § Sedlitz water below), a naturally occurring spa mineral water.

== Composition and use ==
The powders were often packaged in a small envelope containing two coloured paper wraps, one white and one blue. The white packets contained tartaric acid, and the blue packets contained a mixture of 75% w/w Rochelle salt (potassium sodium tartrate) and 25% baking soda (sodium bicarbonate). The powders in the two packets were dissolved separately in water and then mixed, giving off carbon dioxide with a characteristic fizzing sound. The drink was described as "a cooling, agreeable draught".

After ingestion, the powder combines with gastric juices to develop cathartic intestinal gases which can be somewhat helpful in evacuating the users' bowels. However, their use can also lead to unpleasant side effects and can even be fatal in people with conditions such as hernia, bowel obstruction or other ailments.

== Etymology ==
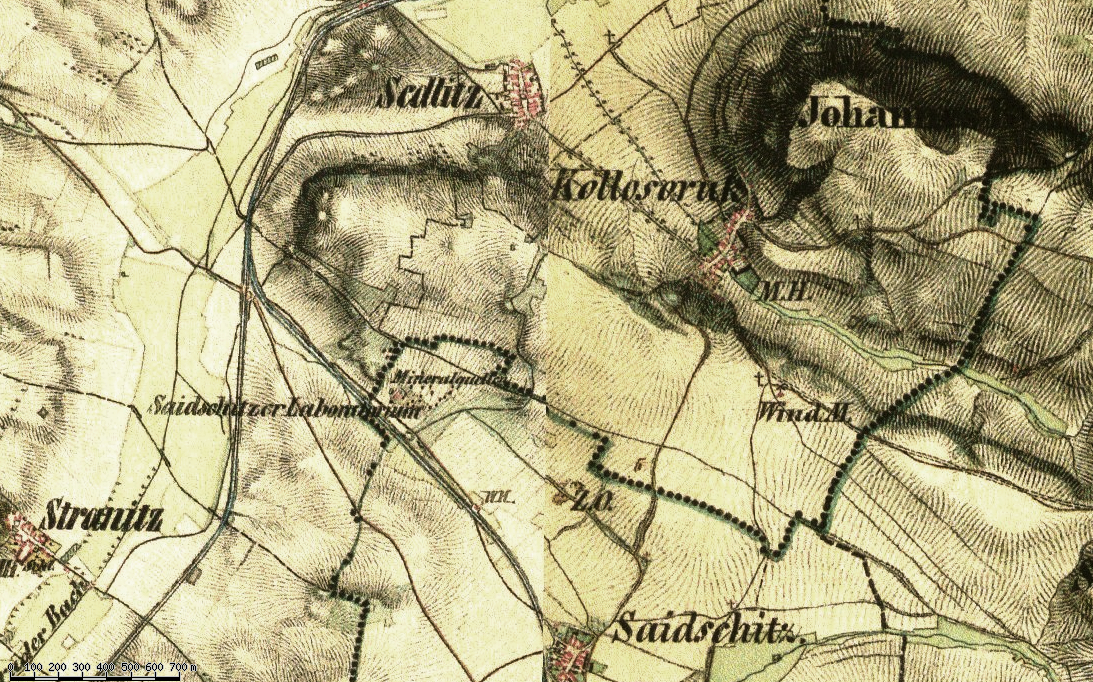
A map showing the origin of the name "Seidlitz powder"

Seidlitz powders, manufactured by numerous chemical factories from the early 19th century onwards, take their name from the village of Sedlec near Most, Bohemia (now in Czech Republic). The village seems to have received its Germanic name (Seidlitz) some time after 1526, when the Battle of Mohács brought about the collapse of Medieval Hungary. The Lands of the Bohemian Crown fell under the control of the Habsburgs, the German-speaking rulers of Austria (later the Austro-Hungarian Empire).

== Sedlitz water, Seidschitz bitter water, etc. ==
Seidlitz powders have a digestive effect. 'Sedlitz water', also named for Sedlec, is a well-known bitter mineral water which has been used since the 16th century, also as a digestion regulator and laxative. Sedlec (Seidlitz) was described in an 1867 guide to European spa towns as "a wretched-looking place, hardly meriting the name of a village, and the wells – whence the water should be derived – are a few shallow, circular pits, whose contents very seldom find their way to this country [England]." Sedlitz water has a chemical analysis similar to sources in nearby towns such as Zaječická hořká from Zajecice (NB German name 'Seidschitz' bitter water'), Korozluky (Ger: Kollosoruk) and Bílina (Bylany or Püllna). The water itself was characterized as "a yellowish, somewhat oily-looking fluid, with a nauseous, intensely bitter taste."

These and similar products – with somewhat interchangeable terminology – appear to have no connection with Seidlitz powders, which themselves are unrelated to pills made from the residue from evaporating mineral-rich water, such as Bilina digestive pastilles, not unlike Vichy pastilles.

== In popular culture ==
Though rarely used today, the term "Seidlitz powder" lives on as a lyric from the popular song "A Fine Romance" by Jerome Kern and Dorothy Fields, written for the 1936 musical film Swing Time, with Fred Astaire and Ginger Rogers. It was released on a 1956 jazz album by Ella Fitzgerald and Louis Armstrong, Ella and Louis Again, with the lines "We two should be like clams in a dish of chowder / But we just fizz like parts of a Seidlitz powder."

"Sounds like a seidlitz powder" is in a O. Henry story, "The Foreign Policy of Company 99".

One of the four clerks of Dodson and Fogg is mixing a "Seidlitz Powder," perhaps to treat a hangover, in chapter 20 of Charles Dickens' Pickwick Papers.

In Windsor McCay's surrealistic comic strip Dream of the Rarebit Fiend, published June 24, 1905, a man attempts to mix Seidlitz powder to cure his headache, but it foams so exuberantly that it destroys his house.

Noël Coward teased the US theatre critic Alexander Woollcott "by recalling that one of [Woollcott's] critical colleagues had called him 'the Seidlitz Powder of Times Square'".

Thomas E. Browne in his Hackney ARP Warden diaries, September 9th, 1941 says the strong Seidlitz he took 'put me right' from the headiness caused by talking too much the previous night at an ARP Wardens meeting, or by the smokey atmosphere in a small room with 53 people.

== See also ==
- Alka-Seltzer
- Epsom salts
