= August Leopold von Reuss =

Austrian ophthalmologist

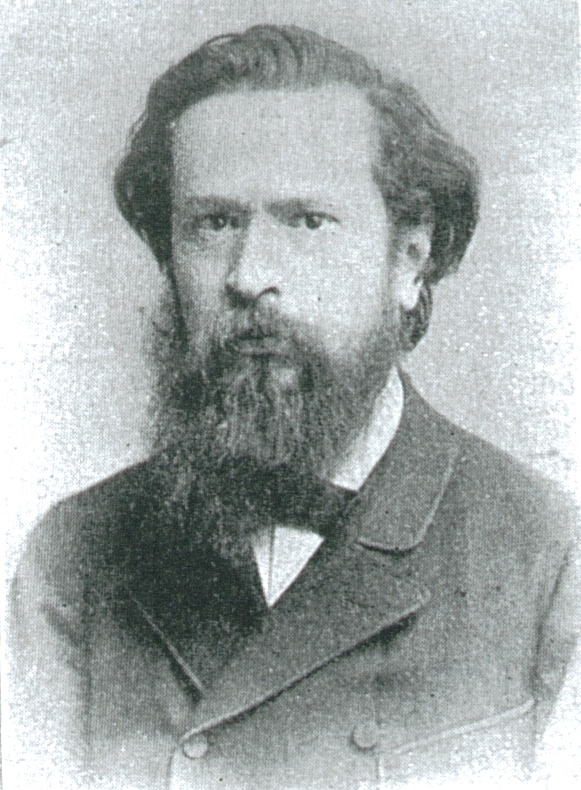
August Leopold von Reuss

August Leopold von Reuss (5 November 1841 – 4 September 1924) was an Austrian ophthalmologist. He was born in Bilin, Bohemia, and died in Vienna. He was the son of the geologist August Emanuel von Reuss (1811-1873), and father to the pediatrician August Reuss (1879-1954).

== Life ==
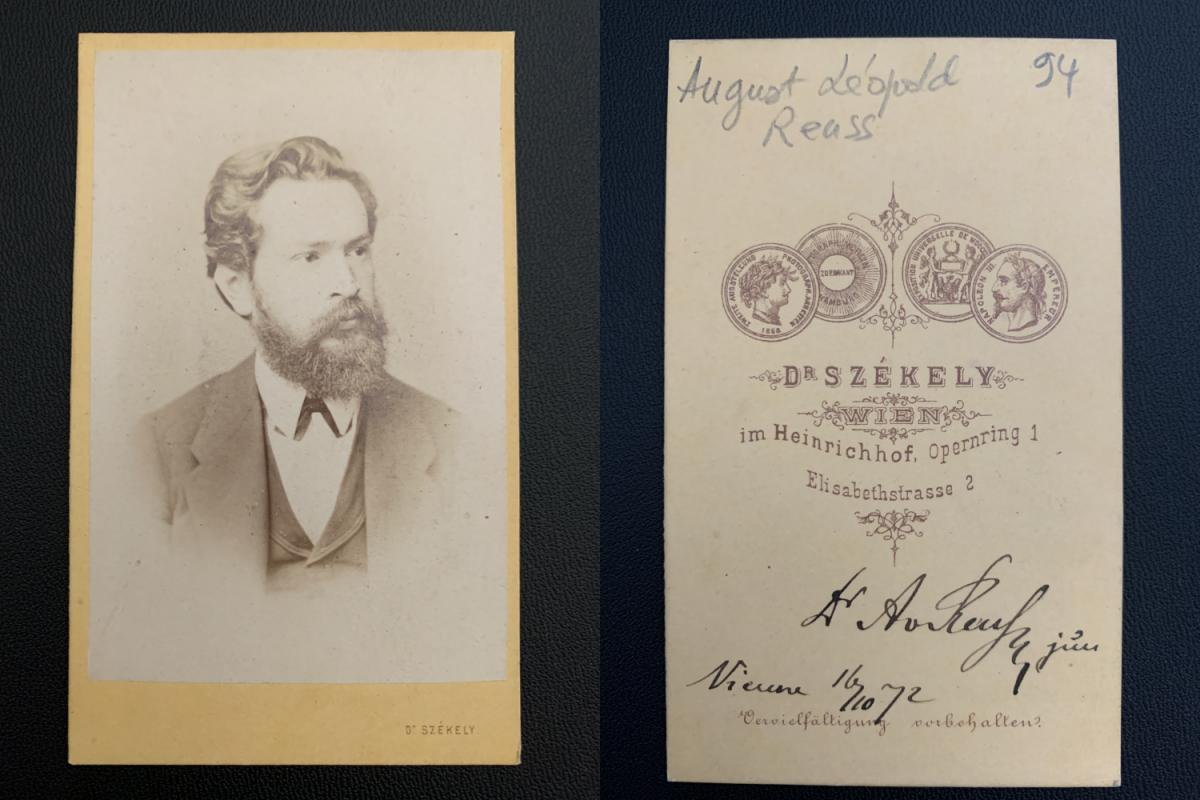
Carte de Visite

He studied at Karl-Ferdinand University in Prague, and at the University of Vienna, where he obtained his degree in 1865. In Vienna, he was a student of Ernst Wilhelm von Brücke (1819-1892) and Eduard Jäger von Jaxtthal (1818-1884). From 1866 to 1870 he was an assistant to the ophthalmologist Carl Ferdinand von Arlt (1812-1887). Later on, he became director of the ophthalmology department at the General Polyclinic Vienna (1872). In 1909 he was named chief of the entire polyclinic.

Reuss made several contributions involving the mathematical aspects of ophthalmic medicine, conducting studies involving optics, ophthalmometry and curvature of the cornea. He also performed extensive research of color blindness, and developed a pseudo-isochromatic color chart that was formerly used to test color blindness.

He published over 75 scientific works, including a 1902 treatise on the visual field in nervous disorders, Das Gesichtsfeld bei functionellen Nervenleiden.

== Works ==
- Ophthalmometrische Studien. with Mikhail Mikhailvitch Woinow (1844-1875) 1869. (Ophthalmometry studies)
- Die Augen der Schüler des Leopoldstädter Communal-Real- und Obergymnasiums in Wien. Vienna 1874.
- Untersuchungen über die optischen Constanten ametropischer Augen. 1877.
- Ophthalmometrische Mitteilungen. (Ophthalmometry releases)
- Einfluss des Lebensalters auf die Krümmung der Hornhaut. In: Albrecht von Graefe: Archiv für Ophthalmologie 27, Abt. 1, 1881. (Influence of age on the curvature of the cornea).
- Die Blindheit und ihre Ursachen. Sammlung gemeinnütziger Vorträge. Prag 1881. (Blindness and its causes).
- Refractionsveränderungen im jugendlichen Auge.
- Über den Nystagmus der Bergleute. In: Albrecht von Graefe: Archiv für Ophthalmologie 23, Abt. 3, 1877. (On nystagmus of miners)
- Farbsinn und Refraction bei Eisenbahnbediensteten. In: Albrecht von Graefe: Archiv für Ophthalmologie 29, Abt. 2, 1883.
- Neue Methode zur Erkennung der Farbenblindheit. (New method for detection of color blindness).
- Die Keratitis maculosa. (keratitis maculosa)
- Ophthalmologische Mittheilungen aus der II. Augenklinik. (Ophthalmic communications from the Department of Ophthalmology II).
- Das Gesichtsfeld bei functionellen Nervenleiden. Deuticke, Vienna 1902.
- Die elektrische Behandlung entzündlicher Augenkrankheiten. In: WMW 63, 1913. (Electrical treatment of inflammatory eye diseases).

== Essays about Reuss ==
- Biographisches Lexikon der hervorragenden Ärzte der letzten fünfzig Jahre. Urban & Schwarzenberg, München und Wien 1962, 2. Band, S. 1287.
- Anton Elschnig; August Ritter von Reuß. In: Sudetendeutsche Lebensbilder. Band 3. Reichenberg 1934, S. 210.
- Julius Hirschberg: Geschichte der Augenheilkunde. Wien 1918, §1235/II, S. 377f, Nachdruck Olms Hildesheim 1978, ISBN 978-3-487-06461-1
