= Bílinská kyselka =

Czech mineral water

Biliner Sauerbrunn
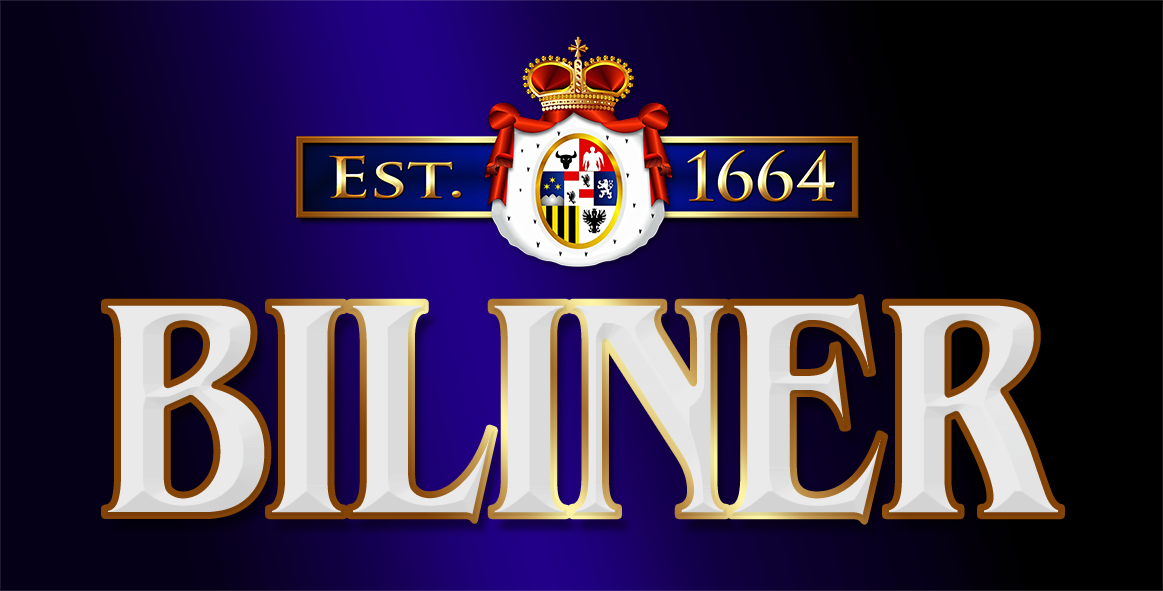
- Country: Czech Republic
- Source: Bilina mineral springs
- Type: Sparkling
- pH: 7.33
- Calcium (Ca): 133.7
- Chloride (Cl): 231
- Bicarbonate (HCO_{3}): 1991
- Lithium (Li): 3.72
- Magnesium (Mg): 41.9
- Potassium (K): 89.33
- Sodium (Na): 1792
- TDS: 7357
- Website: www.bilinska.cz
- All concentrations in milligrams per liter (mg/L); pH without units

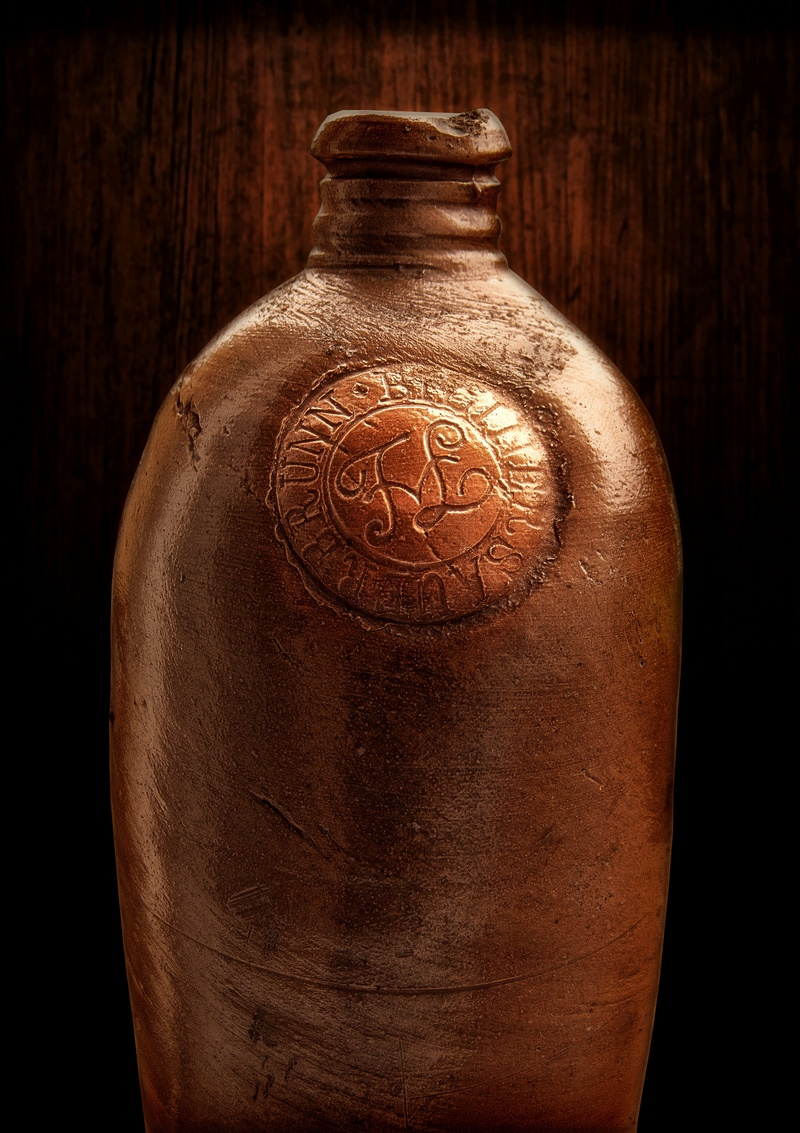
Bílinská kyselka original clay pot 1 L with Biliner Sauerbrunn sign

Bílinská kyselka (in English: Biliner, Bílina acidulous water) is strongly mineralized alkaline bicarbonate (i.e. 5 to 7 grams per litre) mineral water from the Czech town of Bílina. Particularly sodium, potassium, calcium, magnesium, and iron are present as cations, as are anions of chloride, sulfate, and bicarbonate. The temperature of spring water ranges between 17 and 20 °C (63 and 68 °F). Due to the high content of free carbon dioxide is naturally carbonated and packaged without additional chemical modifications. Water is collected from a borehole from a depth of 191 m under the mountain Bořeň. Biliner is available in Europe in one liter and 500 ml bottles. Biliner bottles are cobalt blue polyethylene terephthalate.

Near the source Bílinská Kyselka originated from 16th-century spa buildings of Biliner Sauerbrunn Spa, Kyselka Spa. The Spa was built by the princely House of Lobkowicz.

The authors of the first scientific publications were balneologists Franz Ambrosius Reuss, August Emanuel von Reuss, and Josef von Löschner.

== See also ==
- Zaječická hořká
