= Josef von Löschner =

Austrian doctor (1809–1888)

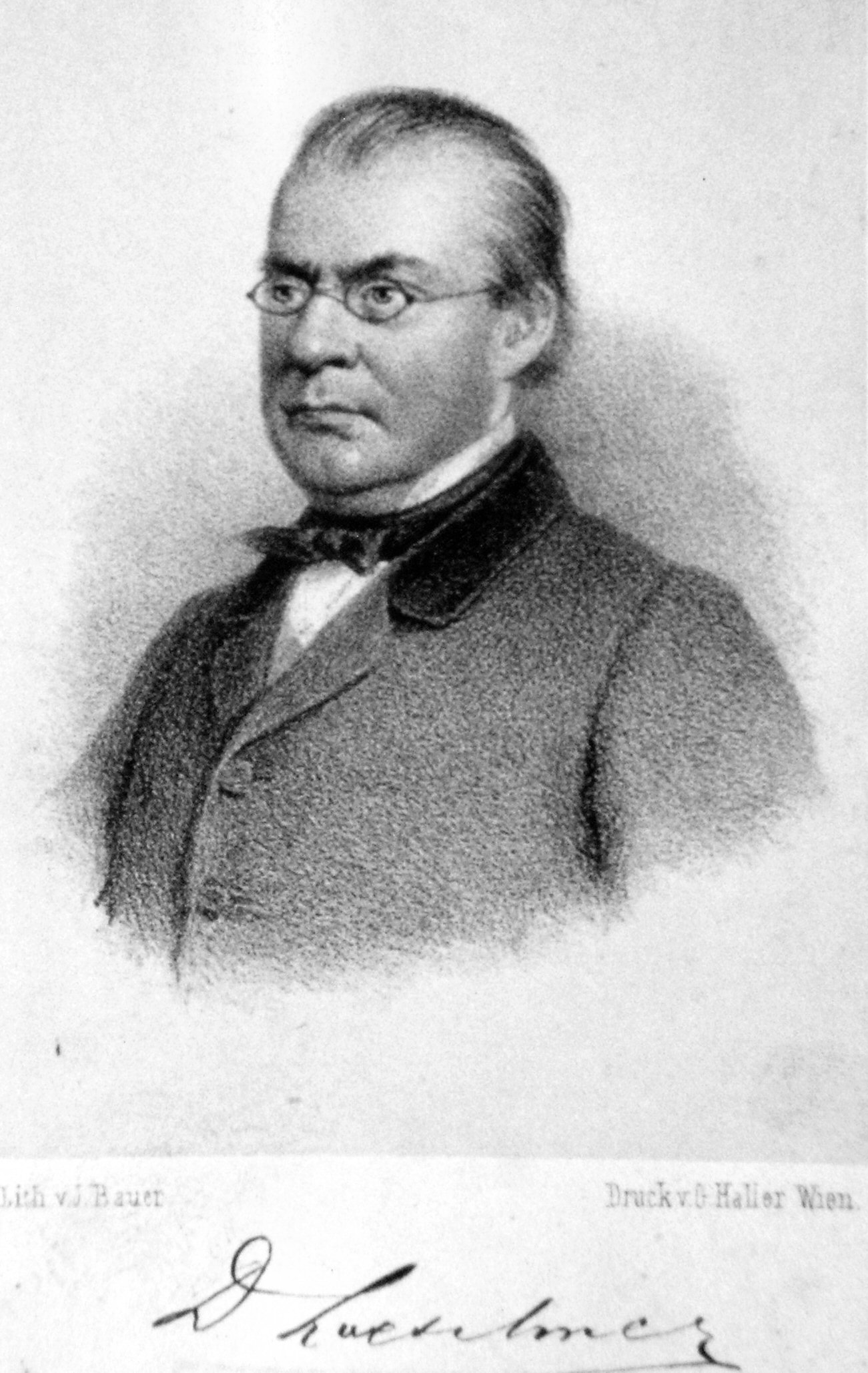
Löschner in c. 1860

Josef Wilhelm Freiherr von Löschner (Czech: Josef Vilém z Löschneru; 7 May 1809 – 19 April 1888) was an Austrian medical doctor.

== Biography ==
Josef von Löschner was born on 7 May 1809 in Kadaň, Bohemia, Austrian Empire. He studied at Gymnasium Kadaň.

In 1834 he received his medical doctorate at Prague, and several years later he obtained his habilitation for balneology (1841). Later on, he became a professor at the University of Prague, where in 1862–1863 he served as university rector. In 1862 he was appointed Landesmedizinalrat, and in 1865 became Hofrat (councilor) and a personal medical doctor to Franz Joseph I. A foundation arranged by Löschner resulted in the creation of the Franz Joseph Kinderhospital in Prague.

Löschner is remembered for his work in the field of balneology. He advocated the curative properties of health spas, and wrote numerous articles promoting the spas of Bohemia. These publications were instrumental in making Bohemian spas a popular tourist destination, particularly the resorts at Karlovy Vary and Bílina, which were regularly visited by members of European royalty.

== Written works ==
- Der Gießhübler Sauerbrunn, 1846 – Kyselka.
- Die Versendung der Karlsbader Mineralquellen, 1847 – The dispatch of the Karlovy Vary mineral springs.
- Das Saidschitzer Bitterwasser, 1853 – Bitter waters of Zaječice.
- Der Sauerbrunnen zu Bilin, 1859 – Bílinská kyselka healing mineral water Bílina.
- Johannisbad im böhmischen Riesengebirge, 1859 – Janské Lázně in the Giant Mountains.
- Beiträge zu Balneologie aus den Kurorten Böhmens, 1862 – Contributions to balneology from the health resorts in Bohemia.
- Balneologische Skizze von Tetschen-Bodenbach, 1862 – Balneological sketch of Děčín.
- Die Eisenwässer von Königswart, 1865 – The ice-cold waters of Lázně Kynžvart).
- Teplitz und die benachbarten Kurorte, 1867 – Teplice and neighbouring health resorts.
