= R. Stothert's & Sons Ltd =

R. Stothert’s & Sons Ltd
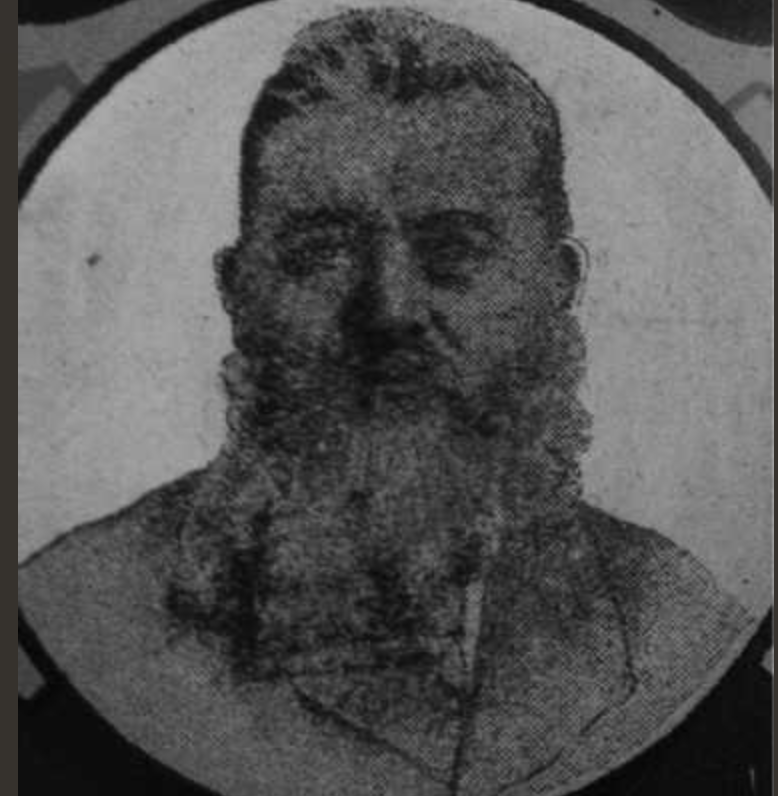
- Company type: Limited
- Traded as: R. Stothert's & Sons Ltd, Stothert's Ltd
- Industry: Chemists, Drinks Manufacturers, Pharmaceuticals, Wholesale
- Founded: 1852
- Founder: Richard Stothert
- Defunct: 1970
- Successor: A.G. Barr
- Headquarters: Atherton, Lancashire, England, Manchester, United Kingdom
- Key people: Richard Stothert (Chairman); Richard Maxwell Stothert (Chairman); Maxwell Harwood Stothert (Chairman)
- Products: Pharmaceuticals, Medicines, Soft Drinks, Chemicals
- Services: Bottling, Canning
- Number of employees: 270+

R. Stothert’s & Sons Ltd (later Stothert's LTD) was originally a firm of chemists founded by Richard Stothert (1830 –1912) in Atherton, Greater Manchester. They were well-known manufacturing chemists and wholesalers of Medicines and Beverages.

== History ==
The business was founded in 1852. Prior to this Richard Stothert, who was born in the village of Goosnargh near Preston was an apprentice to a chemist in 1851 and worked and lived in Bolton. Stothert's were well known by their main marketing image of "The bearded man" (founder Richard Stothert) placed on its tins and boxes.

Early production included pills, tonics, ointments and powders for common medical complaints. The bearded man also featured on bottles of ginger beer and carbonated drinks that the company started producing in the early 20th century.

Stothert's was one of the first to use Codd-neck bottles and beverage cans in the United Kingdom. They expanded their premises in 1905 Stothert products had a major outlet in Thwaites arcade, Blackburn and Stothert's were known to have done business with The Great Store Chemists, Portsmouth and Taylors drug co. LTD.

The Company was handed down to Maxwell Harwood Stothert in the 1940s. In the 1960-70s after 120 years of business Stothert's Ltd was absorbed by soft drink giant A.G. Barrs of Glasgow (Iron Bru), the Stothert's factory of Atherton became one of their four main bottling plants. The factory was closed and demolished in 2006.

== Products ==
R.Stothert & Sons products
Head & Stomach Pills

Back & Kidney Pills

Aspirin Tablets

Albon Tablets

Ginger beer

Mineral water

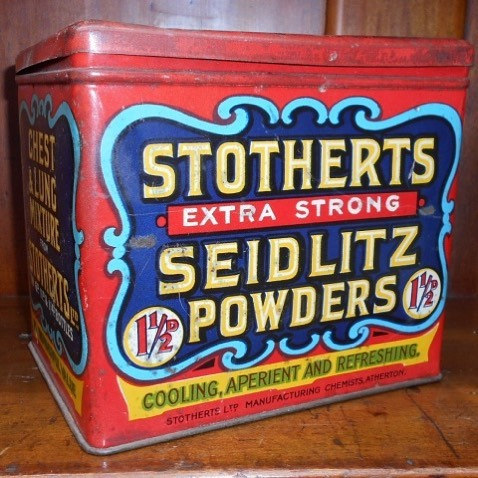
Seidlitz powder

Laxatives

Rubber adhesive Plasters

Shaving razors

Feeding bottles

Caster Oil

Footpaste

Vapour Ointment

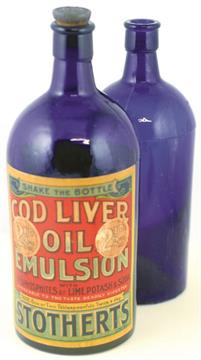
Cod liver oil

Health Tonic

Chest & Lung Mixture

Caster Oil Pills

Glycerine & Ipec

== See also ==
- A.G. Barrs of Glasgow
- Codd-neck bottles
- Beverage cans
- History of Manchester
