= August Reuss =

Austrian pediatrician (1879–1954)

August Reuss (28 May 1879, in Vienna – 31 October 1954, in Vienna) was an Austrian pediatrician. He was the son of ophthalmologist August Leopold von Reuss (1841–1924).

In 1903, he earned his medical doctorate from the University of Vienna, later working as an assistant at the university Kinderklinik (children's hospital). In 1924 he became an associate professor at the university, and during the following year founded the children's section of the Kaiser-Franz-Josef-Spital. In 1930 he relocated to the University of Graz as chair of the children's hospital. From 1934 he was director of the Kinderklinik Glanzing in Vienna.

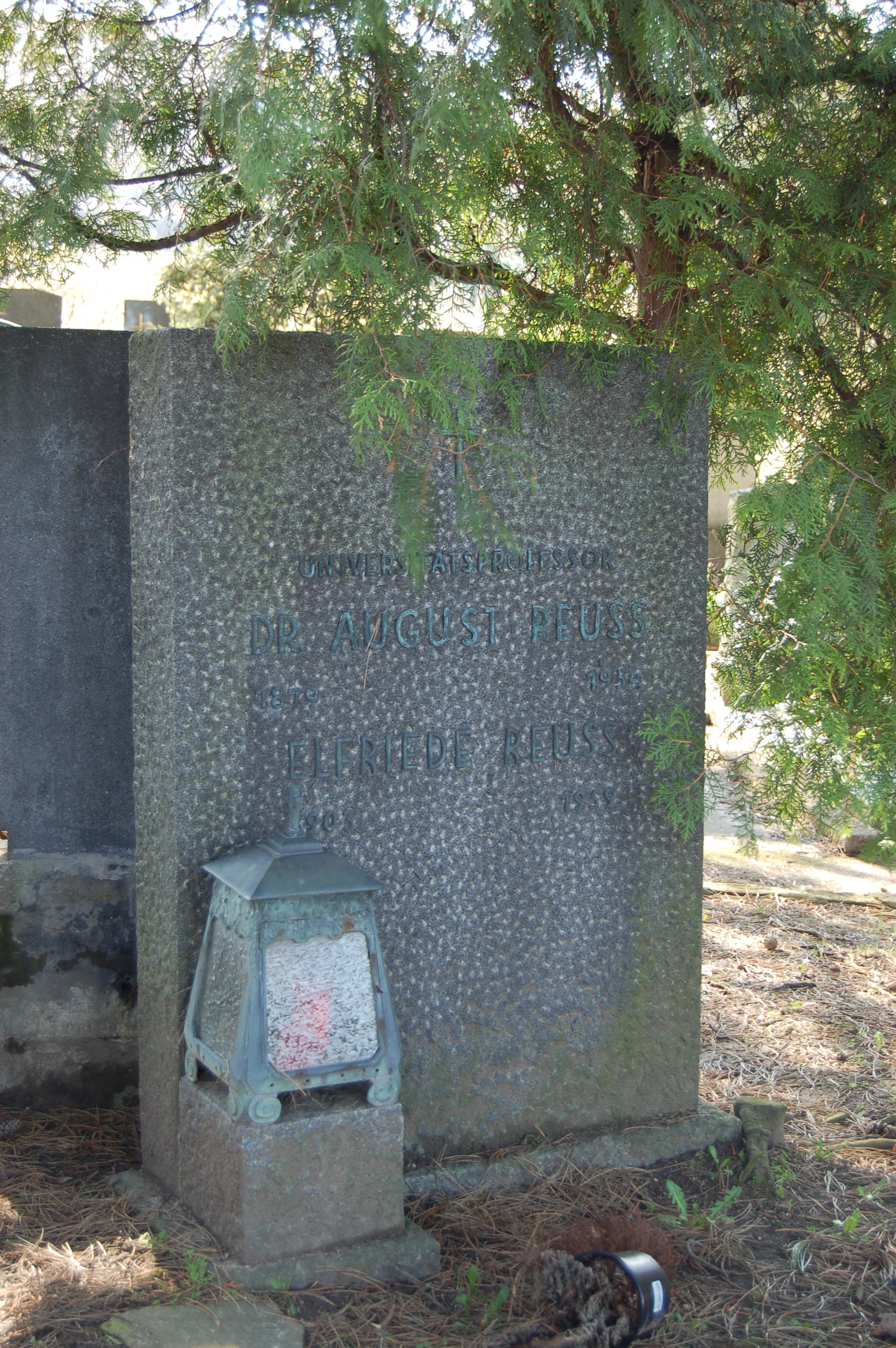
Gravesite of Reuss at the Neustifter Friedhof in Vienna

Reuss is known for improvements made in the field of pediatrics, especially in regards to the newborn. He strove for recognition of pediatrics as a separate medical specialty and was a pioneer of Austrian social pediatrics. Among his written works was the highly regarded Die Krankheiten des Neugeborenen (1914), later being translated into English as "The Diseases of the Newborn".

Other noted works by Reuss include:

- Die Ernährung des Neugeborenen, 1925 - Nourishment for the newborn.
- Die Aufzucht der Fruhgeborenen und Lebensschwachen Kinder, 1925 - On premature and underdeveloped children.
- Säuglingsernährung, 1929 - Infant nutrition.
- Säuglingskrankheiten, 1935 - Infant diseases.
