= Mikhail Mikhailowitsch Woinow =

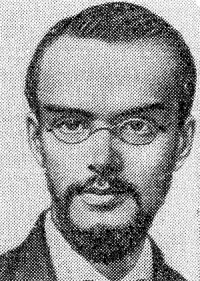

Mikhail Mikhailowitsch Woinow, surname sometimes spelled as Voinov (1844 - 1875) was an ophthalmologist from the Russian Empire who worked in the Austrian Empire and later in Germany.

He served as an assistant to Hermann von Helmholtz (1821-1894) and Otto Becker (1828-1890) at the University of Heidelberg and to Carl Ferdinand von Arlt (1812-1887) in Vienna. Later he established an ophthalmologic practice in Moscow, where he also gave lectures at the university.

In Vienna he conducted pioneer ophthalmometric research with August Leopold von Reuss (1841-1924) that included studies of corneal astigmatism following cataract extraction. The two men are credited as the first to describe exact ophthalmometric observations on "wound astigmatism". In addition to work in ophthalmometry, Woinow published a number of papers on subjects such as ametropia, the blind spot, binocular vision, color vision, accommodation, etc.

== Selected writings ==
- Ophthalmometrische Studien. (with August Leopold von Reuss), Vienna 1869.
- Ophthalmometrie. Vienna: A. Holzhausen for W. Braumüller, 1871.
- Über das Verhalten der Doppelbilder bei Augenmuskellähmungen. 1870 (On the behavior of double vision eye muscle paralysis).
