= Miloslav Stingl =

Czech writer (1930–2020)

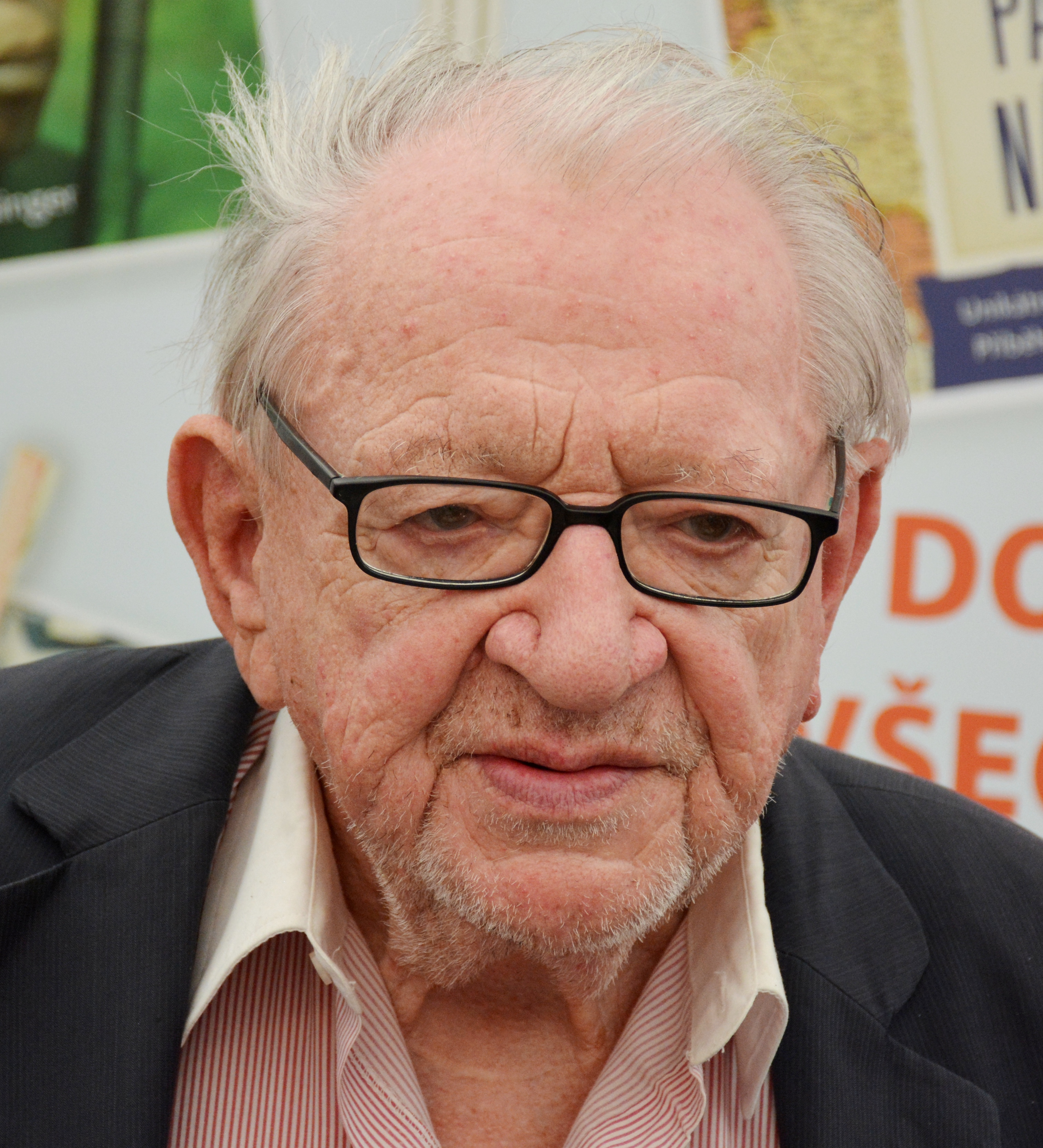
Miloslav Stingl in 2015

Miloslav Stingl (19 December 1930 – 11 May 2020) was a Czech ethnologist, traveller and author. He was an expert on Mayan culture and the history of pre-Columbian America.

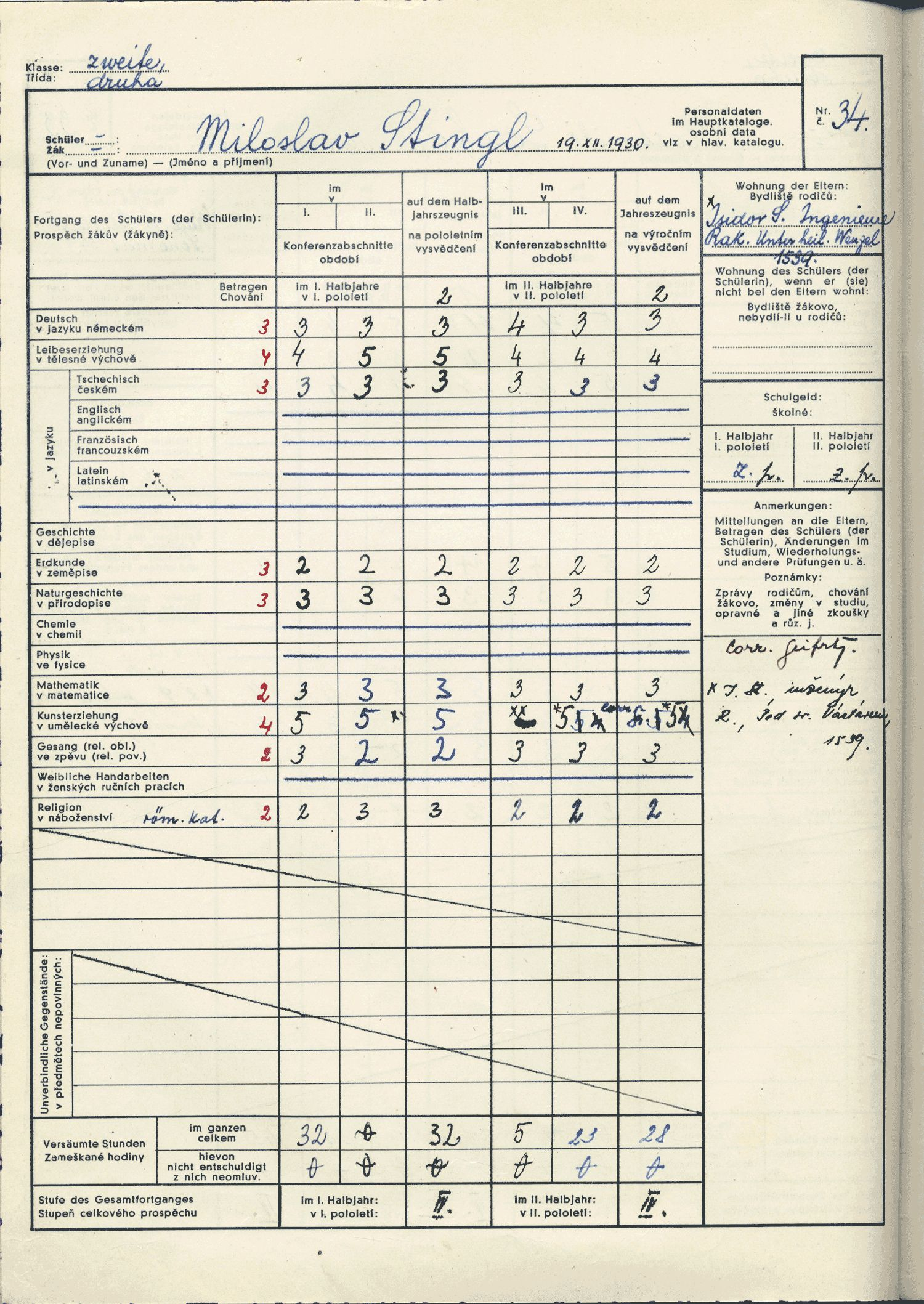
Miloslav Stingl school report 1944 (SOkA Rakovník)

Stingl was born in Bílina. He studied international law at the Faculty of Arts at Charles University before switching to ethnography. He worked for ten years at the Czechoslovak Academy of Sciences from 1962 to 1972. Stingl was a signatory of the Anticharta, a condemnation of Charter 77. However Stingl signed unaware of the content of the Charter, and later regretted his participation.
