= Carl Ferdinand Peters =

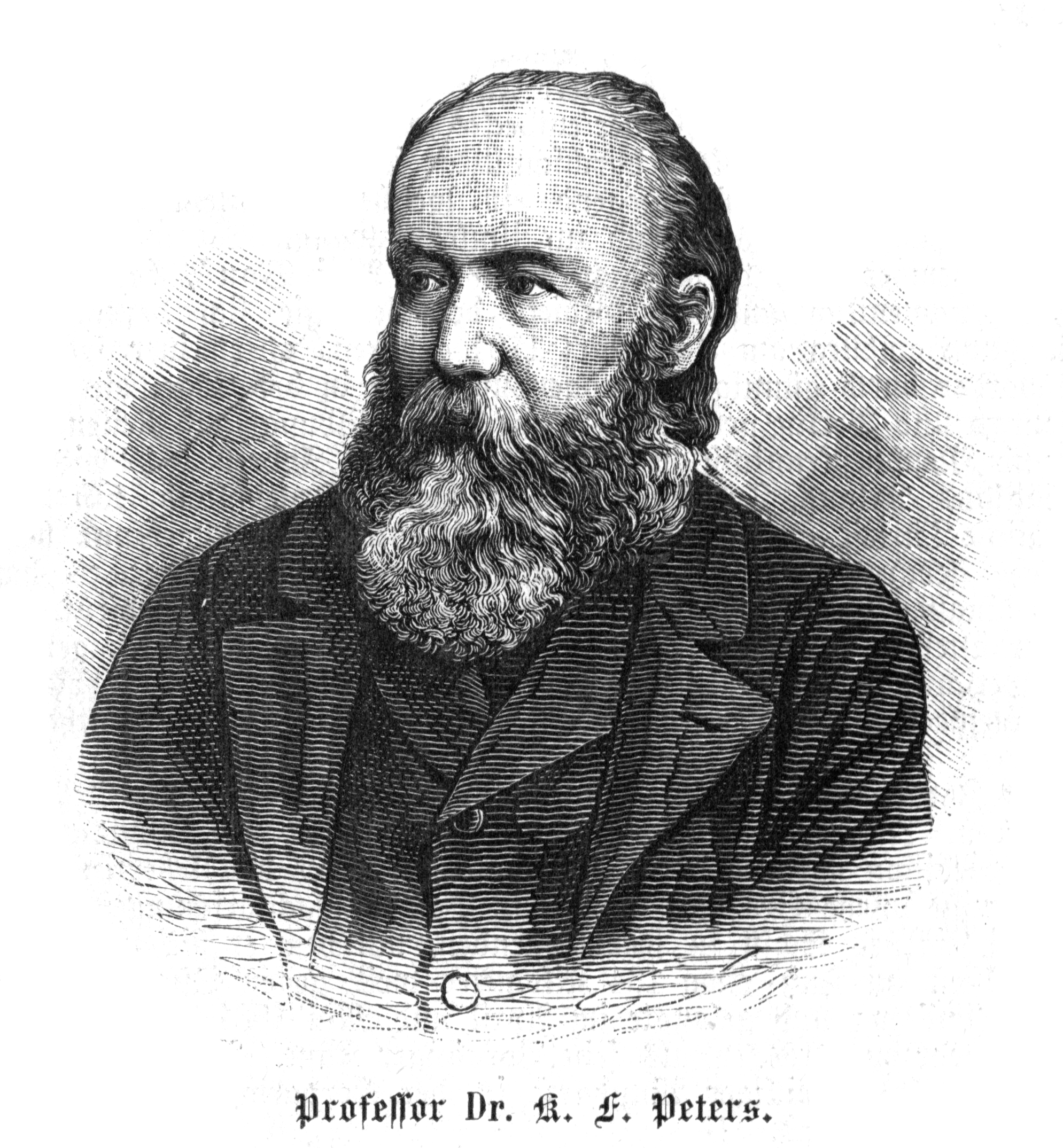

Carl Ferdinand Peters (13 August 1825 – 7 November 1881) was an Austrian medical doctor and geologist. He became a professor of mineralogy at the University of Graz. He described and named the minerals Szaibélyite (after Stephen Sjájbely, 1777–1855) and Biharit.

== Life and work ==
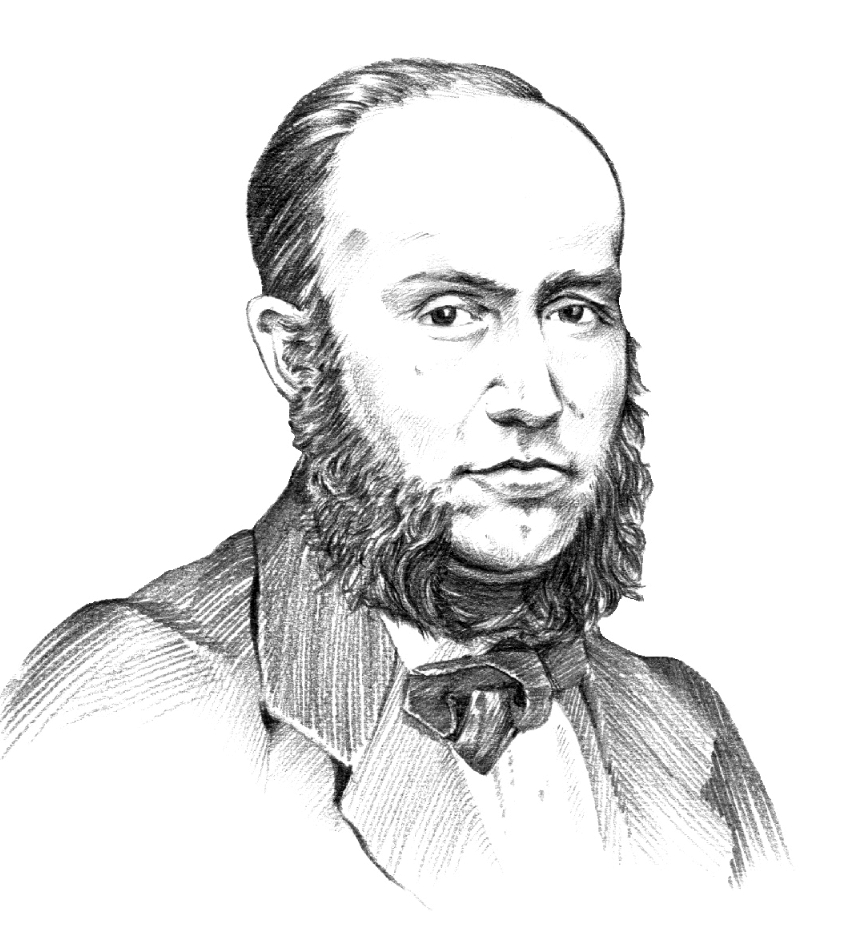

Peters was born in Liebshausen in the Lobkowitz castle near Libceves to Leopold Peters (1791–1855), who was the manager of the estate of Prince Lobkowitz, and Karoline, the daughter of the physician Franz Ambros Reuss. He grew up in Neundorf-Eisenberg near Brüx spending summers with his maternal grandparents in Bilin and became interested in the natural sciences early in his life. He saw the mineral collections of Prince Lobkowitz and had travelled in the mountains with his father. He later travelled and explored geology in the Bohemian central uplands with his grandfather and his uncle August Emanuel Reuss. He went to gymnasium in Prague and showed talents in painting and fine arts. He was influenced by Ferdinand Hessler and Franz Exner. A brother of his Otto Seraphim Peters (1858–1908) went on to study art. He however moved to the Polytechnic Institute and studied under Franz Xaver Zippe from 1842. Peters was in the circle of Johann Czermak and met the sons Josef and Johann Nepomuk Czermak. In 1843 he studied medicine at the University of Prague under Josef Hyrtl on comparative anatomy and also attended lectures of Wilhelm Haidinger and Franz Hauer at the museum. He also studied under Johann Oppolzer. In 1847 he was in Vienna and in 1848 he took part in the revolution serving in the medical service. He graduated in March 1849 with a doctorate and began to work under the dermatologist Ferdinand Hebra at the Vienna General Hospital. He suffered from a medical condition and quit medical practice. He taught natural history at a Graz school and in 1852 he wrote a work on the stratigraphy of a cretaceous formation in the eastern Alps which led to a position in the Imperial Geological Institute in Vienna. This allowed him to explore Upper Austria, Carinthia, Upper Carniola, Salzburg and other interesting areas. In 1855 he was appointed professor of mineralogy at Pest. He left the position in 1861 due to the political situation ("October Diploma") and moved to the University of Vienna. In 1864 he studied the Danube Delta for the government. He suffered from a paralysis of one foot and his wife Anna Maria Elisabeth, née von Blumfeld (1833–1864, married in 1856) died in 1864. This put an end to his travels and he then worked mainly on paleontology. He described many fossils from the region.

As a person trained in geology and medicine he also worked for the municipality of Graz on matters of sanitation and drainage. In 1870 he was elected to the provincial parliament where he worked for the construction of a new mental asylum at Feldhof along with Josef Czermak. He was an influential teacher. He also worked on public education and pedagogy and had an interest in the training of teachers at grammar and secondary schools for whom he wrote a guide. After the death of his wife, he married her younger sister Leopoldine von Blumfeld (1839–1892) in 1865. From his first marriage he had five children and from the second he had two but only one, Guido Peters (1866–1937), survived and became a noted pianist.
