= August Emanuel von Reuss =

Austrian geologist and palaeontologist (1811-1873)

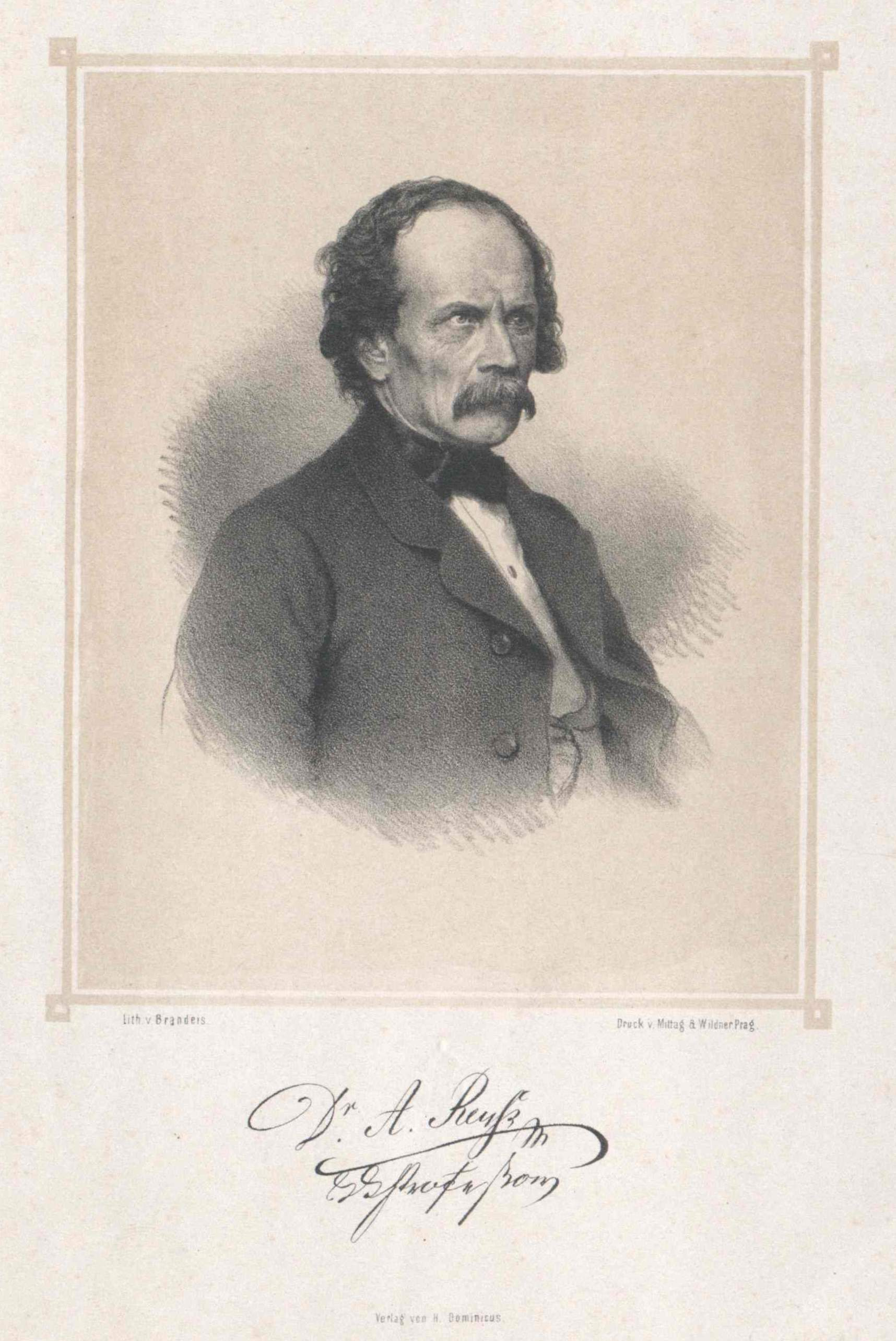

August Emanuel Rudolph von Reuss (8 July 1811 – 26 November 1873) was an Austrian geologist and palaeontologist.

== Biography ==
Reuss was born on 8 July 1811 in Bílina, Bohemia. He was the son of Franz Ambrosius Reuss (1761–1830) and the father of ophthalmologist August Leopold von Reuss (1841–1924). He was educated for the medical profession, graduating in 1834 at the University of Prague, and afterwards practising for fifteen years at the Bílinská Kyselka (Biliner Sauerbrunn) spa.

His leisure was devoted to mineralogy and geology, and the results of his researches were published in Geognostische Skizzen aus Böhmen (1840–1844) and Die Versteinerungen der Böhmischen Kreideformation (1845–1846). In 1849 he gave up his medical practice, and became professor of mineralogy at the university of Prague. There he established a fine mineralogical collection, and he became the first lecturer on geology.

In 1863 he was appointed professor of mineralogy in the University of Vienna. He investigated the Cretaceous fauna of Gosau, and studied the Crustacea, including Entomostraca, the corals, bryozoa, and especially the Foraminifera of various geological formations and countries. He died in Vienna on 26 November 1873.
