= Julius Hirschberg =

German ophthalmologist (1843–1925)

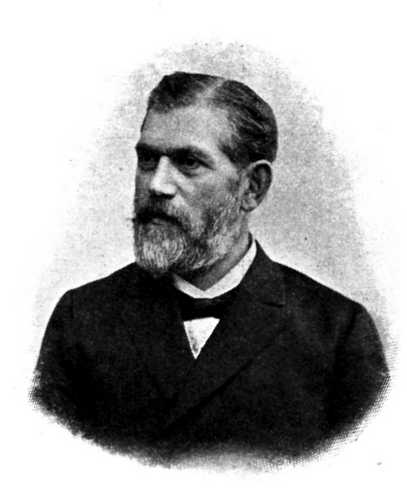
Julius Hirschberg (1843-1925)

Julius Hirschberg (18 September 1843 – 17 February 1925) was a German ophthalmologist and medical historian. He was of Jewish ancestry.

In 1875, Hirschberg coined the term "campimetry" for the measurement of the visual field on a flat surface (tangent screen test) and in 1879 he became the first to use an electromagnet to remove metallic foreign bodies from the eye. In 1886, he developed the Hirschberg test for measuring strabismus. His series Geschichte der Augenheilkunde (History of Ophthalmology), nine volumes written from 1899 to 1917, is considered by some to be one of his greatest achievements.

== Selected publications ==
- Geschichte der Augenheilkunde. Berlin: Springer; published in 9 volumes from 1899 to 1918
  - Vol. 1. Geschichte der Augenheilkunde im Alterthum
  - Vol. 2. Geschichte der Augenheilkunde im Mittelalter
  - Vol. 3. Die vernehmlichsten Augenärzte und Pfleger der Augenheilkunde im 18. Jahrhundert und ihre Schriften
  - Vol. 4. Deutschland's Augenärzte, von 1800 bis 1850
  - Vol. 5. Frankreichs Augenärzte, von 1800 bis 1850
  - Vol. 6. Englands Augenärzte, von 1800 bis 1850
  - Vol. 7. Italiens Augenärzte, von 1800 bis 1850
  - Vol. 8, Part A. Die Augenärzte der Schweiz, von 1800 bis 1850; Die Augenärzte Belgiens, von 1800 bis 1850; Niederländische Augenärzte, von 1800 bis 1850; Die Skandinavischen Augenärzte, von 1800 bis 1850; Die Augenärzte Rußlands, von 1800 bis 1850; Polnische Augenärzte, im 19. Jahrhundert; Die Augenärzte in der Iberischen und der Balkan-Halbinsel, sowie in den Außereuropäischen Ländern während des Neunzehnten Jahrhunderts
  - Vol. 8, Part B. Amerikas Augenärzte im 19. Jahrhundert
