= Bořeň =

Coordinates: 50°31′40″N 13°45′50″E

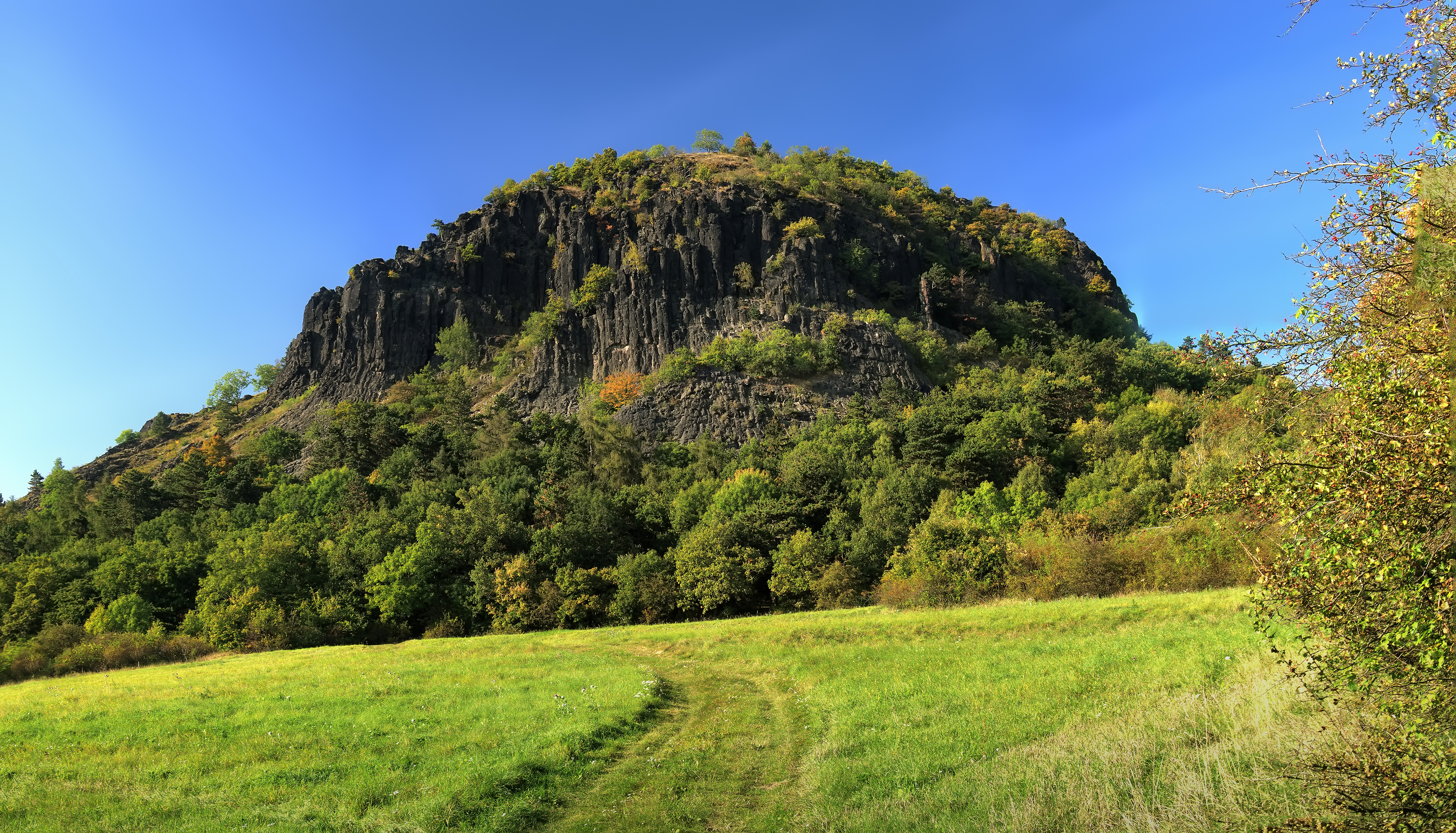
Bořeň from the south

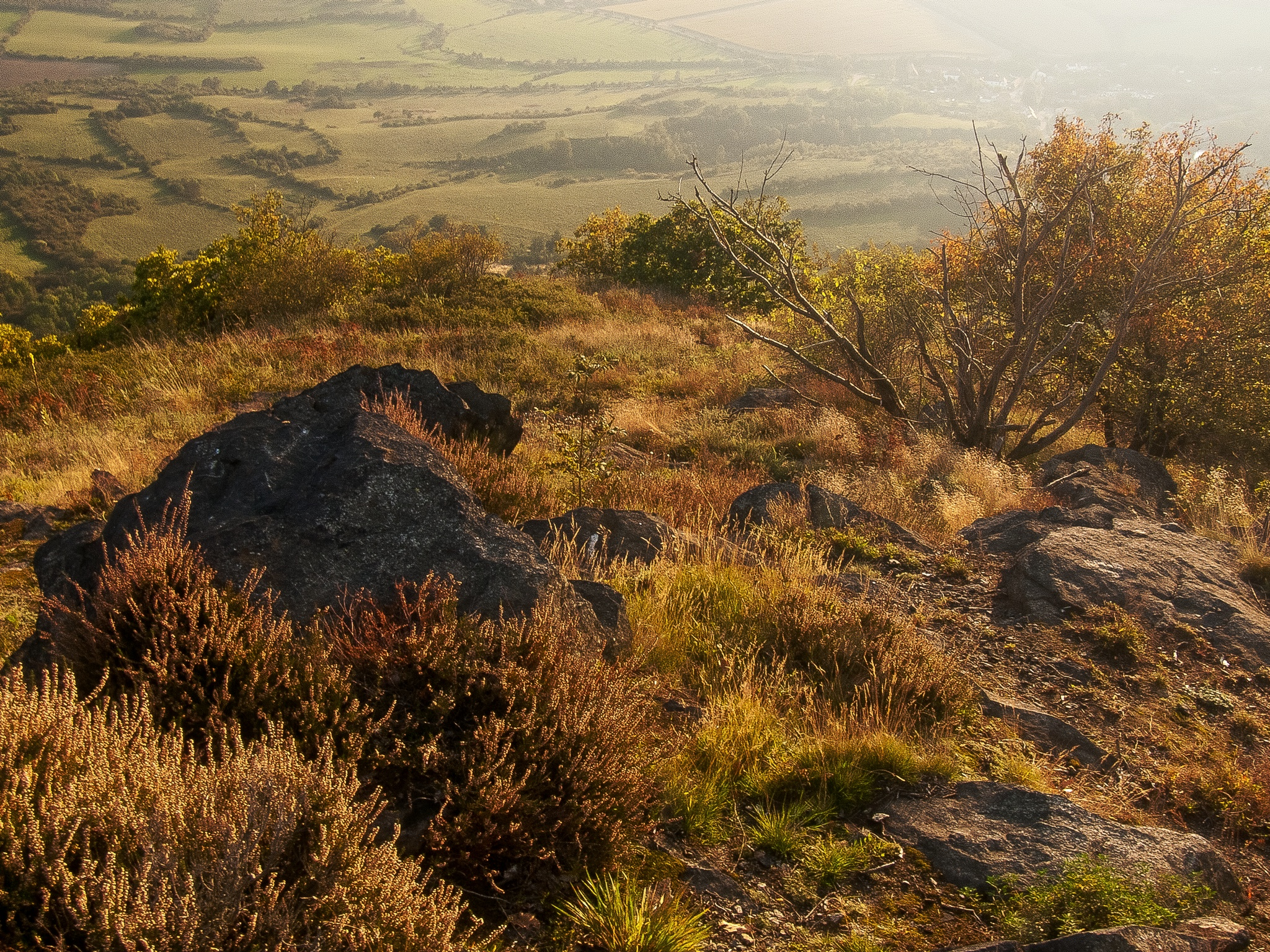
Bořeň vegetation

Bořeň (German: Borschen) is a phonolite hill in the Central Bohemian Uplands in the Czech Republic. It has an elevation of 539 m (1,768 ft) and is located in the territory of Bílina in the Ústí nad Labem Region. When seen from the northwest side, the hill has the shape of a lying lion. It is a structure similar to the Devils Tower in Wyoming, and is the largest phonolite structure of its kind in Europe.

There are also mineral water springs which are the source of Bílinská Kyselka water.
