= Franz Ambros Reuss =

Czech geologist, mineralogist and balneologist (1761-1830)

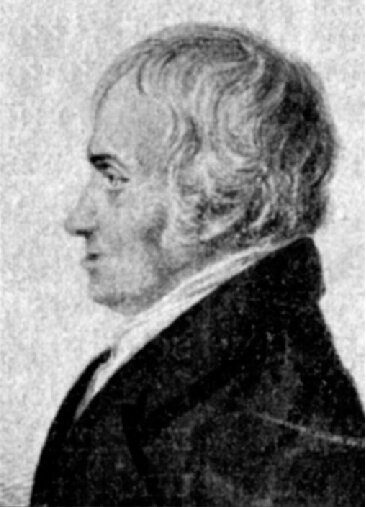

Franz Ambros Reuss (František Ambrož Reuss; 3 October 1761 – 9 September 1830) was a Czech geologist, mineralogist and balneologist. He worked at the Bílina spa as a medical doctor and is considered the father of Czech balneology. He was the father of geologist August Emanuel von Reuss.

== Biography ==
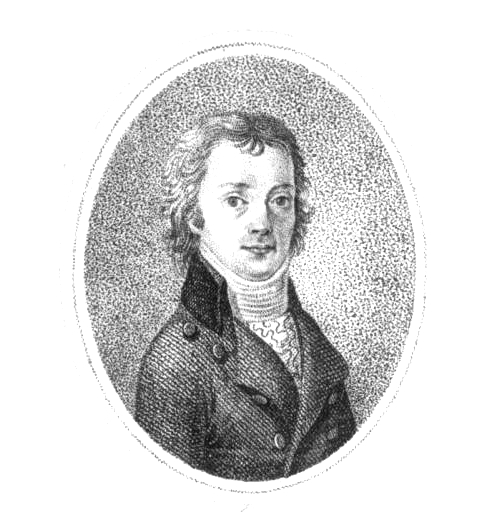
Reuss, c. 1800

Reuss was born on 3 October 1761, Prague, Bohemia, the son of a tailor from southern Baden. He studied philosophy and later medicine in Charles University in Prague and obtained his medical doctorate on 4 October 1783. As a student, he developed a strong interest in geology and mineralogy and subsequently visited the Bergakademie in Freiberg, where he attended lectures given by Abraham Gottlob Werner, a proponent of geological Neptunism. Later on, he was hired by Prince Franz Josef Maximilian Lobkowitz (1772–1816) to serve as a spa and town physician (Stadt-und Herrschaftsarzt) in Bílina in northwestern Bohemia. He first examined the composition of the mineral springs of Bohemia which then led to more geological researches. In 1799 he published on the waters of Bilin and in 1818 he wrote on Marienbad. He used the analytical techniques of Berzelius. Here, he conducted investigations of the regions' mineral deposits, that included orographic and paragenetic studies of its highlands. He was the author of a number of works on the composition, geology and utilization of mineral resources at Bílina, Františkovy Lázně, Libverda, Teplice, etc. For this, and for his comments made regarding the mining aspects of regional mineral deposits, he was named royal Bergrath (councilor of mines) in 1808.

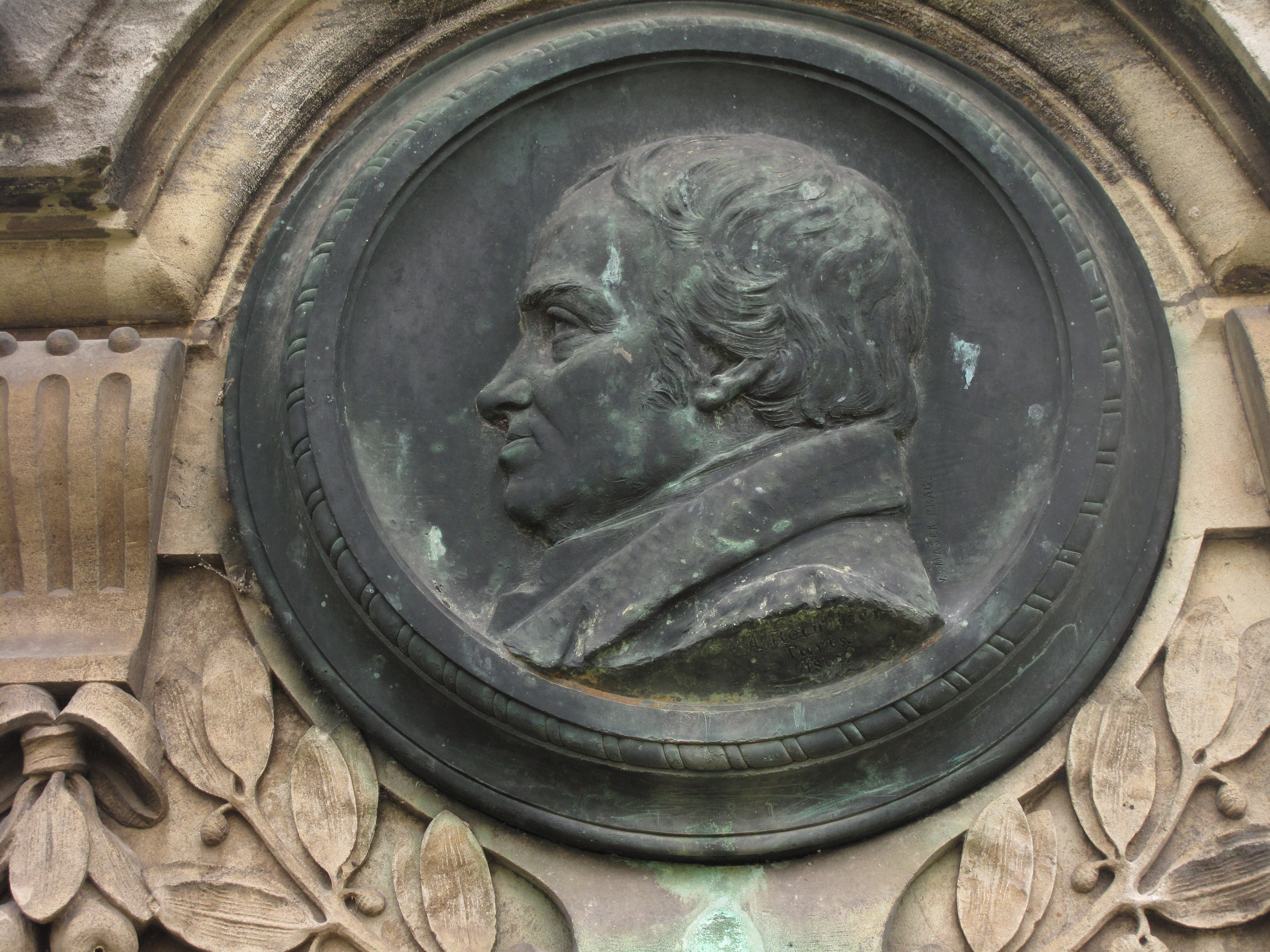
Relief of Franz Ambros Reuss at the Reuss Denkmal, Bilina

Reuss followed Werner's ideas noting that basalt was of aquatic origin. A correspondent of Johann Wolfgang von Goethe and Alexander von Humboldt, he was elected to the Göttingen Academy of Sciences in 1800. He also conducted extensive mineralogical studies of the regions' mineral springs from a medicinal standpoint. From 1780, he assembled a systematic collection of minerals and fossils that was held in the Lobkowitz castle. He also collected plant species in his herbarium which was expanded greatly by his son, August Emanuel. Reuss was a Neptunist and he examined Komorní Hůrka and suggested that it was a pseudo-volcano. He examined the burning of coal seams which he suggested was due to volcanism. This area was visited by Goethe who considered it as volcanic.

Reuss married Katharina Scheithauer in 1797 and they had four daughters and four sons. One of his daughters Karlone, married to Leopold Peters (1791-1855) had a son Carl Ferdinand Peters who became a mineralogist at the University of Graz. Reuss died on 9 September 1830, Bílina, at the age of 68 following an abdominal injury.

== Published works ==
He was the author of a four-volume textbook on mineralogy, Lehrbuch der Mineralogie (1801–06), in which he gives a total account of Werner's ideas. A few of Reuss's other written efforts are:

- Orographie des nordwestlichen Mittelgebirges in Böhmen, 1790 – Orography of the northwestern highlands of Bohemia.
- Naturgeschichte der Biliner Sauerbrunnen in Böhmen, 1788
- Mineralogische Geographie von Böhmen, (2 volumes) 1793–97 – Mineralogical geography of Bohemia. Volume 1, Volume 2
- Sammlung naturhistorischer Aufsätze: Mit vorzüglichen Hinsicht auf die Mineralgeschichte Böhmens, 1796.
- Die Mineralquellen zu Bilin, 1808 – The mineral springs of Bilin.
- Die Mineralquellen zu Mscheno in Böhmen, 1804
- Die Mineralquellen zu Liebwerda in Böhmen, 1811 – The mineral springs of Liebwerda.
