= Korozluky =

- Municipality
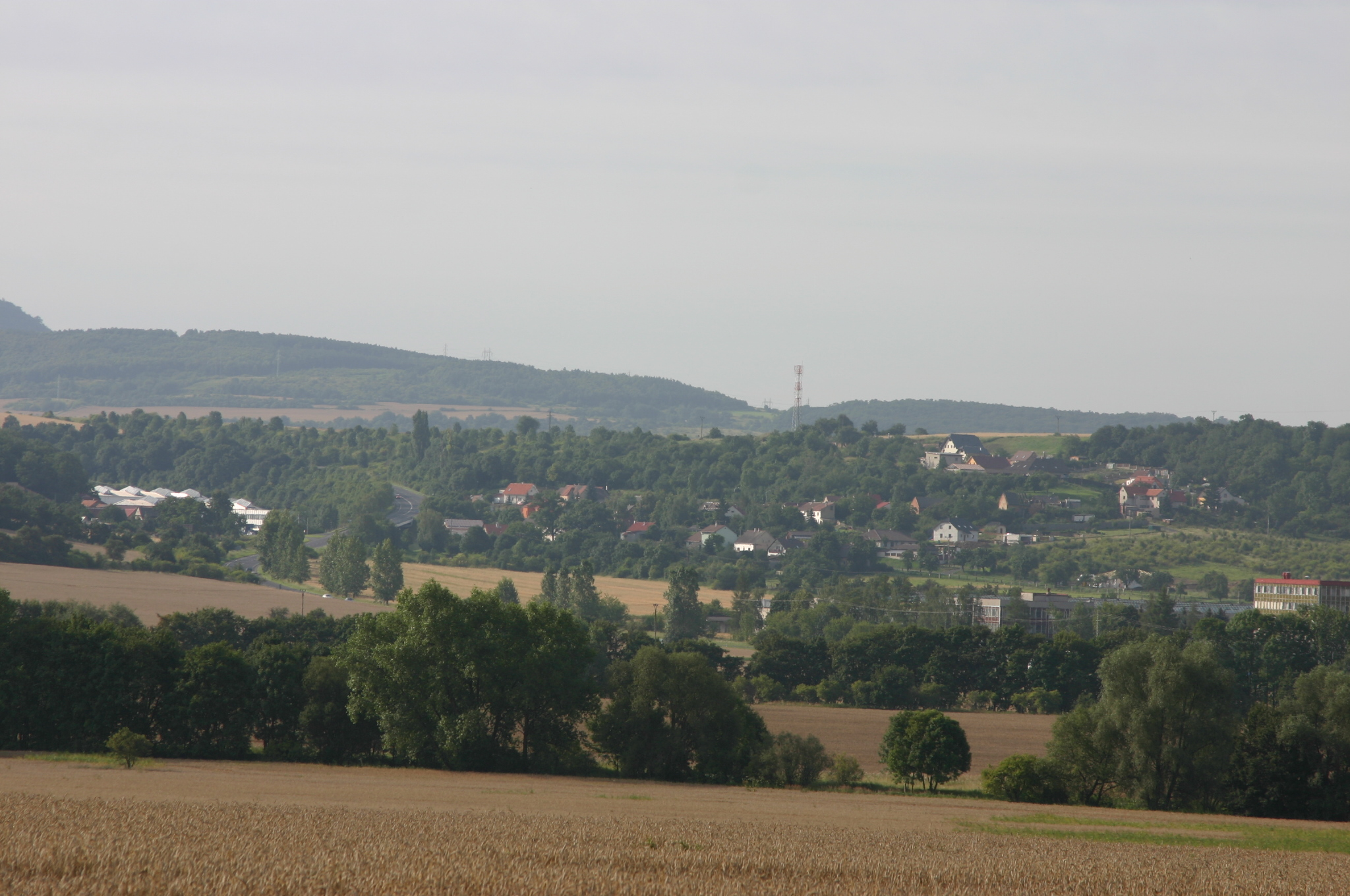
- View from the north

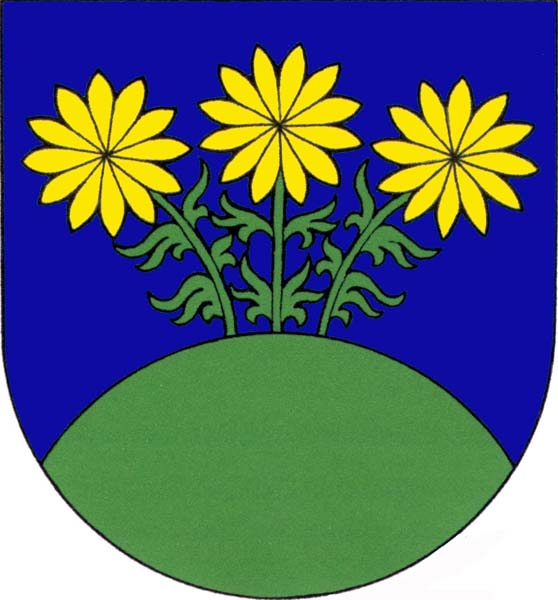
- Flag Coat of arms

- Location in the Czech Republic
- Coordinates: 50°28′43″N 13°43′23″E
- Country: Czech Republic
- Region: Ústí nad Labem
- District: Most
- First mentioned: 1325

Area
  - Total: 6.38 km^{2} (2.46 sq mi)
- Elevation: 235 m (771 ft)

Population (2026-01-01)
  - Total: 273
  - Density: 42.8/km^{2} (111/sq mi)
- Time zone: UTC+1 (CET)
  - Summer (DST): UTC+2 (CEST)
- Postal code: 434 01
- Website: www.korozluky.cz

Korozluky (German: Kolosoruk) is a municipality and village in Most District in the Ústí nad Labem Region of the Czech Republic. It has about 300 inhabitants.

Korozluky lies approximately 7 kilometres (4 mi) south-east of Most, 31 km (19 mi) south-west of Ústí nad Labem, and 66 km (41 mi) north-west of Prague.

== Administrative division ==
Korozluky consists of two municipal parts (in brackets population according to the 2021 census):

- Korozluky (174)
- Sedlec (49)

== Demographics ==
Historical population
| Year | Pop. | ±% |
|---|---|---|
| 1869 | 426 | — |
| 1880 | 453 | +6.3% |
| 1890 | 463 | +2.2% |
| 1900 | 483 | +4.3% |
| 1910 | 550 | +13.9% |
| 1921 | 501 | −8.9% |
| 1930 | 581 | +16.0% |
| 1950 | 453 | −22.0% |
| 1961 | 468 | +3.3% |
| 1970 | 378 | −19.2% |
| 1980 | 215 | −43.1% |
| 1991 | 102 | −52.6% |
| 2001 | 123 | +20.6% |
| 2011 | 174 | +41.5% |
| 2021 | 223 | +28.2% |
Source: Censuses
