= Bílina =

- Town
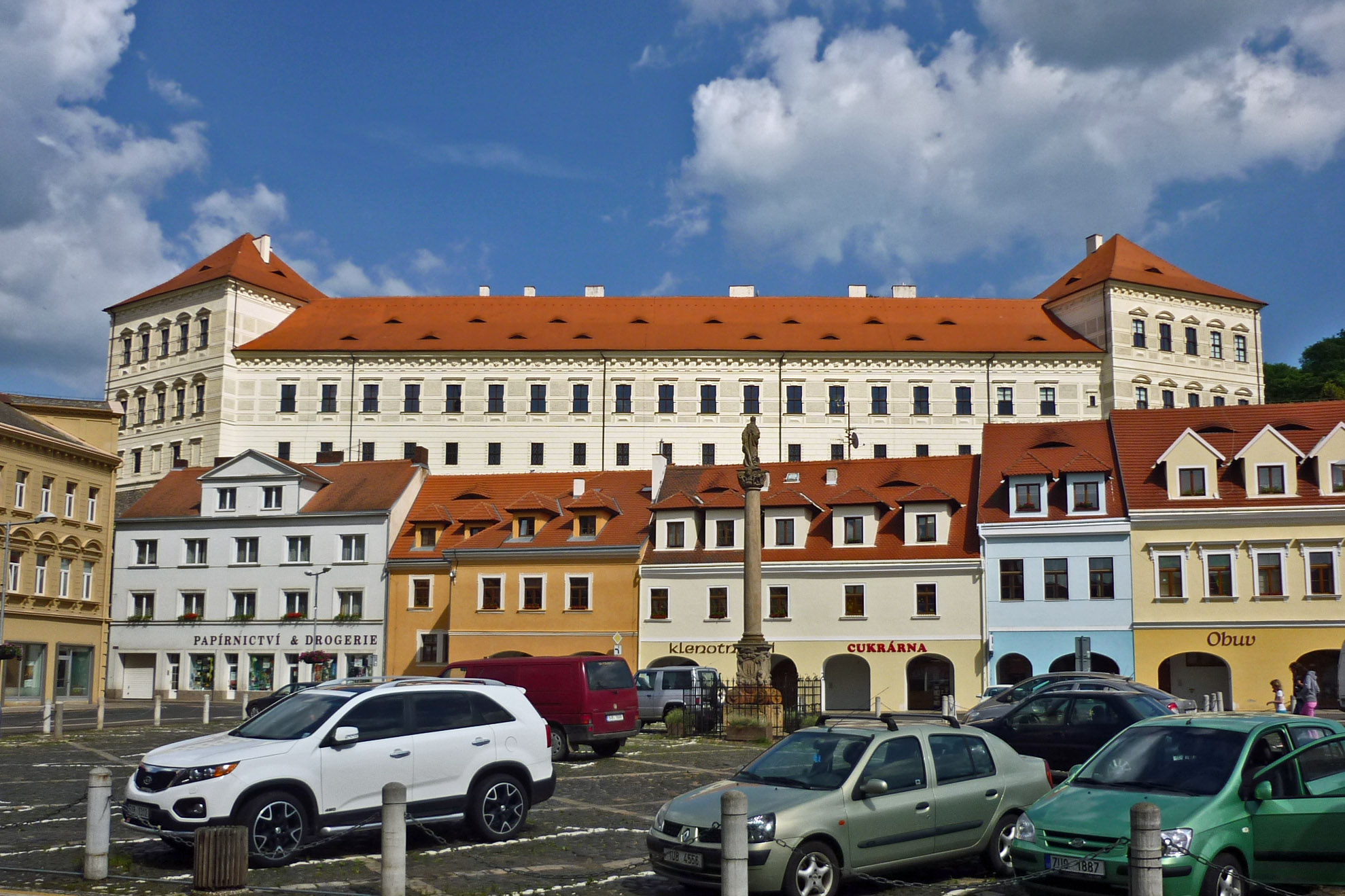
- Bílina Castle behind the square

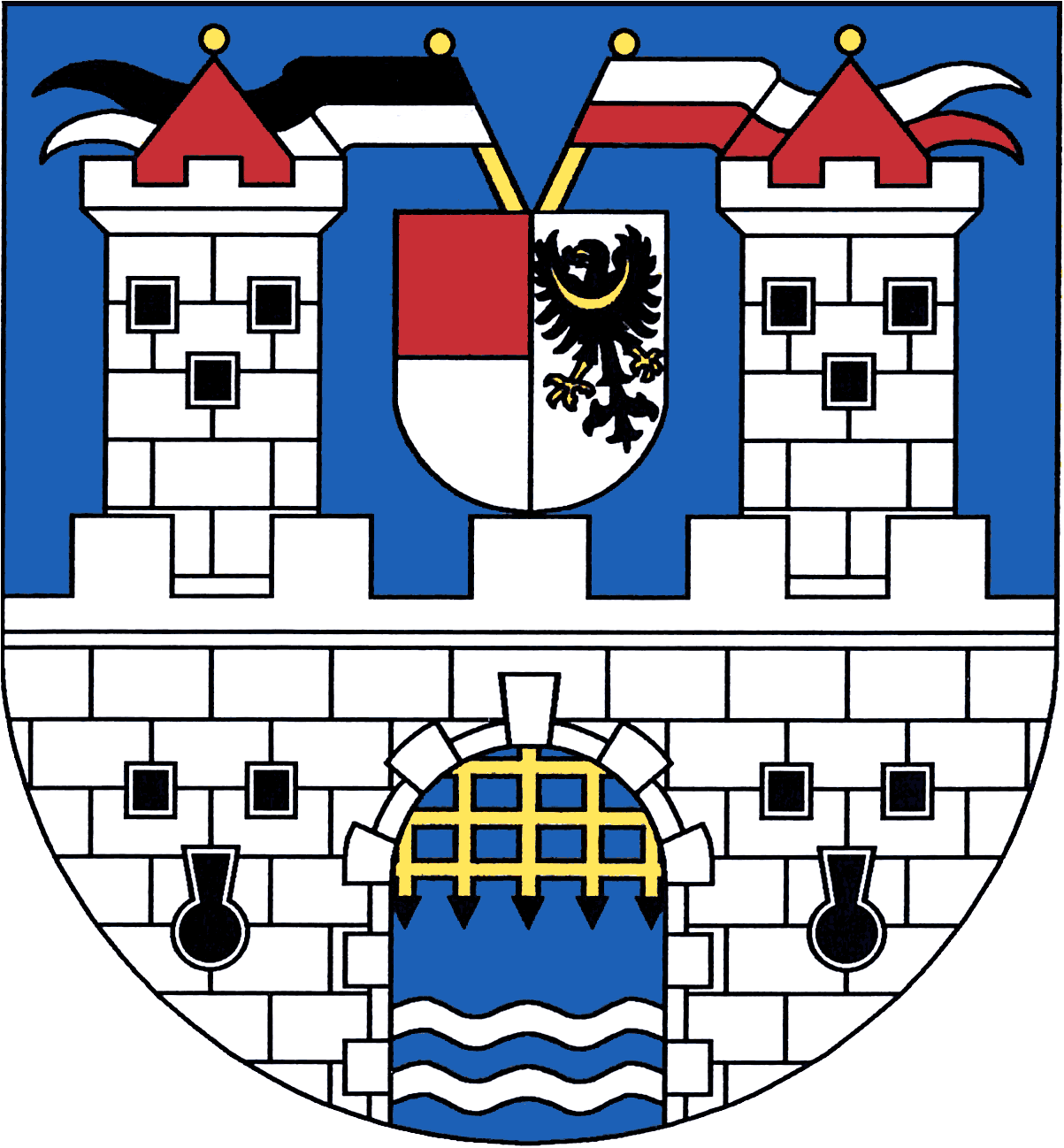
- Flag Coat of arms

- Location in the Czech Republic
- Coordinates: 50°32′53″N 13°46′34″E
- Country: Czech Republic
- Region: Ústí nad Labem
- District: Teplice
- First mentioned: 993

Government
  - Mayor: Radek Zenker (ANO)

Area
  - Total: 32.50 km^{2} (12.55 sq mi)
- Elevation: 214 m (702 ft)

Population (2026-01-01)
  - Total: 14,401
  - Density: 443.1/km^{2} (1,148/sq mi)
- Time zone: UTC+1 (CET)
  - Summer (DST): UTC+2 (CEST)
- Postal code: 418 01
- Website: www.bilina.cz

Bílina (Czech pronunciation: [ˈbiːlɪna]; German: Bilin) is a spa town in Teplice District in the Ústí nad Labem Region of the Czech Republic. It has about 14,000 inhabitants. The town is located on the Bílina River, on the border between the Most Basin and Central Bohemian Uplands.

Bílina was founded in the 10th century and became a town in the second half od the 13th century. It is known for the strongly mineralised water Bílinská kyselka. The historic town centre is well preserved and is protected as an urban monument zone.

== Administrative division ==
Bílina consists of six municipal parts (in brackets population according to the 2021 census):

- Bílina (537)
- Chudeřice (7)
- Mostecké Předměstí (954)
- Pražské Předměstí (2,230)
- Teplické Předměstí (8,418)
- Újezdské Předměstí (1,958)

== Etymology ==
The name of the town originates from the adjective bílý (bielý in Old Czech), meaning 'white'. The term Bielina ('white/bald place') is etymologically derived either from the fact that there was an area without any wood or from sparkling waters of the Bílina river (formerly called Bělá).

== Geography ==
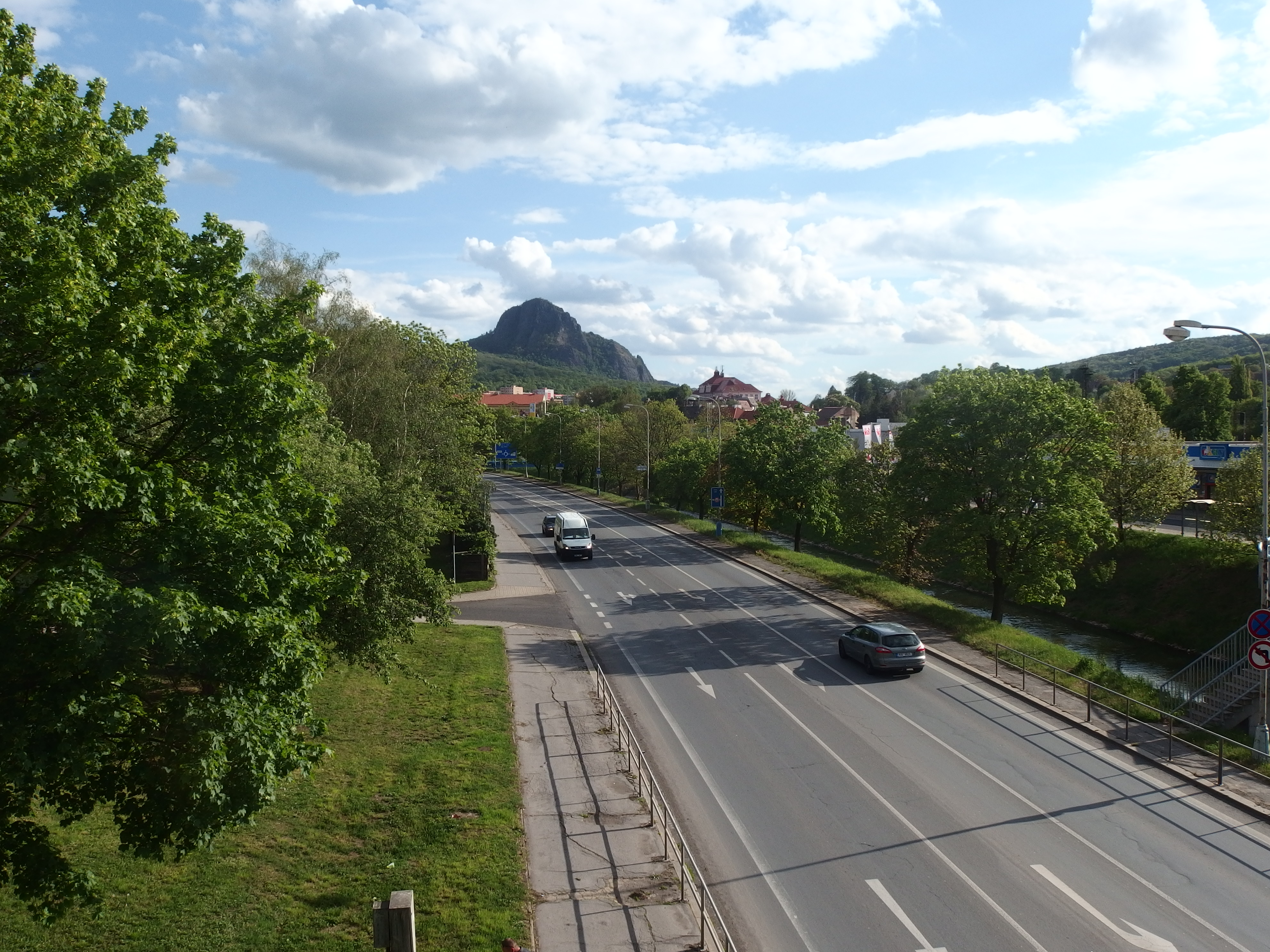
Bílinská street with Bořeň

Bílina is located about 10 kilometres (6 mi) south of Teplice and 10 km (6 mi) northeast of Most. It lies on the border between the Most Basin and Central Bohemian Uplands. It is situated in the valley of the Bílina River.

The town is dominated by two features. The steep hill of Bořeň is a large phonolite hill, dominating the town and its surroundings. It lies on the southern municipal border and is the highest point of the town at 539 m (1,768 ft) above sea level. It lies in the eponymous national nature reserve. The second feature is the giant lignite mine Bílina which seriously altered surrounding landscape.

== History ==
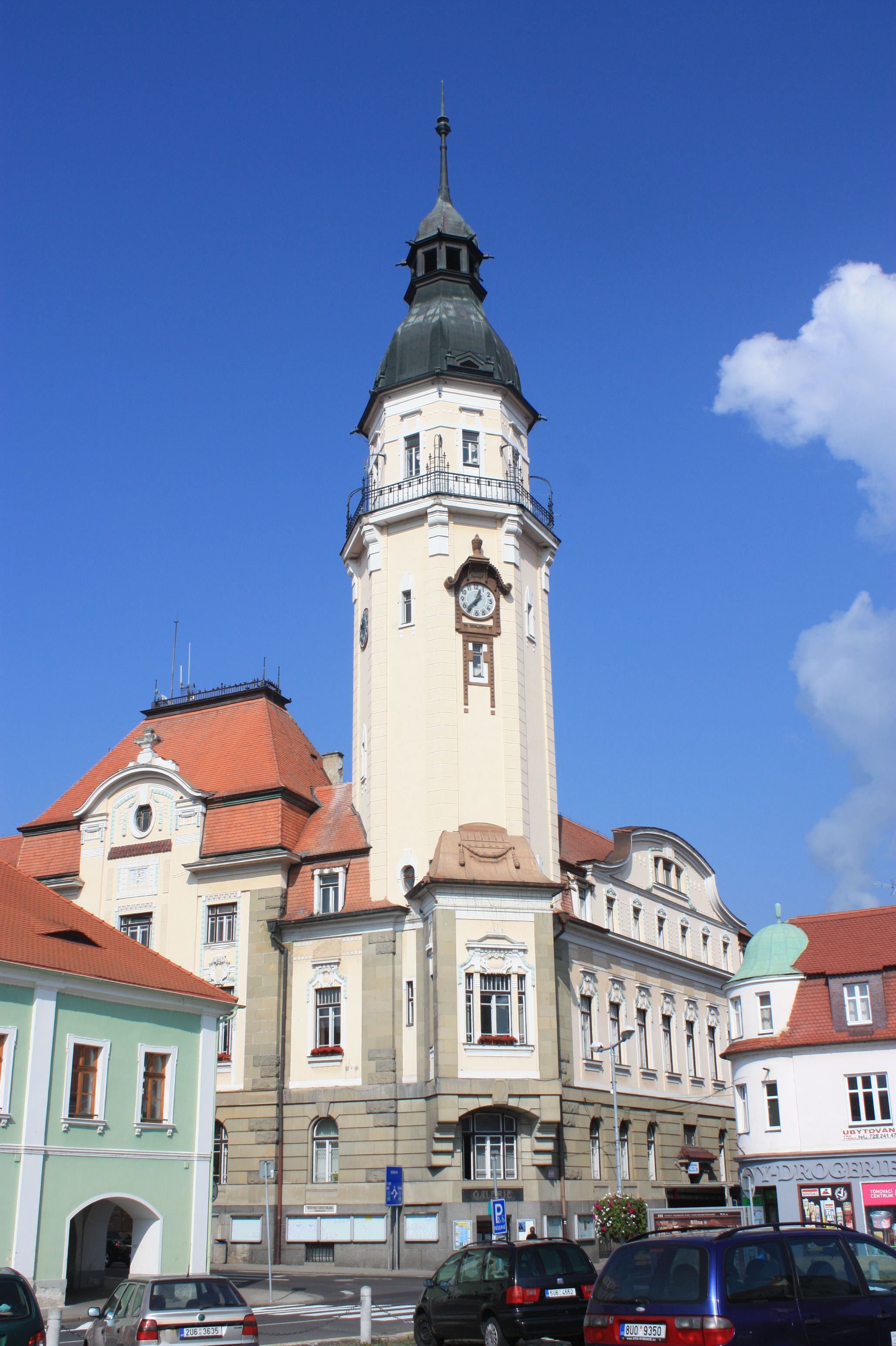
Town hall

=== 10th–15th centuries ===
In the 10th century, a gord was built here and became the new administrative centre of the area. The first written mention of Bílina is on a privilege of Pope John XV from 993, when it was mentioned as a seat of a province (Latin: provincia Belinensis). A record in Chronica Boemorum describes a battle between Duke Bretislaus I and the German Emperor Henry III near the gord in 1040–1041.

In the 1230s, Bílina ceased to be the administrative centre. In 1237, King Wenceslaus I donated Bílina to the knight Ojíř of Friedberg, who had built a new castle in the settlement, which was expanded into a medieval town with bulwarks and three gates in the second half of the 14th century. Bílina was referred to as a town for the first time in 1263.

In 1407, Bílina was purchased by lord Albrecht of Koldice, well known for his anti-Hussite attitude. Thus, Bílina was surrounded and conquered by the Hussite hejtman Jakoubek of Vřesovice who returned Bílina to the Koldice family in 1436. Lords of Koldice kept the town until 1495.

=== 16th–19th centuries ===
In 1502, Bílina was acquired by the aristocratic Lobkowicz family who later had built a new castle on the site of the Gothic castle, designed by Swiss-Italian architect Antonio della Porta. In 1568, a large fire severely damaged the town. In 1634, during the Thirty Years' War, the town was conquered and looted by the Swedish army. Due to the violent re-Catholicisation, part of the inhabitants of Bílina were murdered and others emigrated to Protestant countries. The town was then re-settled by people from Saxony and gradually became predominantly German-speaking. In the second half of the 17th century, the town recovered and began to prosper again.

The rapid development of Bílina occurred in the 19th century, when industrialisation began. A sugar factory, a porcelain factory and a glass factory were established. The town fortifications were gradually demolished and the town expanded. In 1871–1872 and 1874–1887, the two railways were built. Czech families started moving to the town for work.

=== 20th century ===
From October 1938 to May 1945, was annexed by Nazi Germany and administered as a part of the Reichsgau Sudetenland. After the liberation of Czechoslovakia, almost all Germans were expelled from the town. The decline in population was replaced after the war by immigrants of Czech origin from Volhynia and Balkans, as well as Slovaks and Romani people.

Another turning point in the history of town was a changeover in 1989, after the end of the Communist regime. Descendants of the Lobkowicz family regained a part of their original property, including the spa; the spa was sold to a private company in 1997.

=== Spa ===
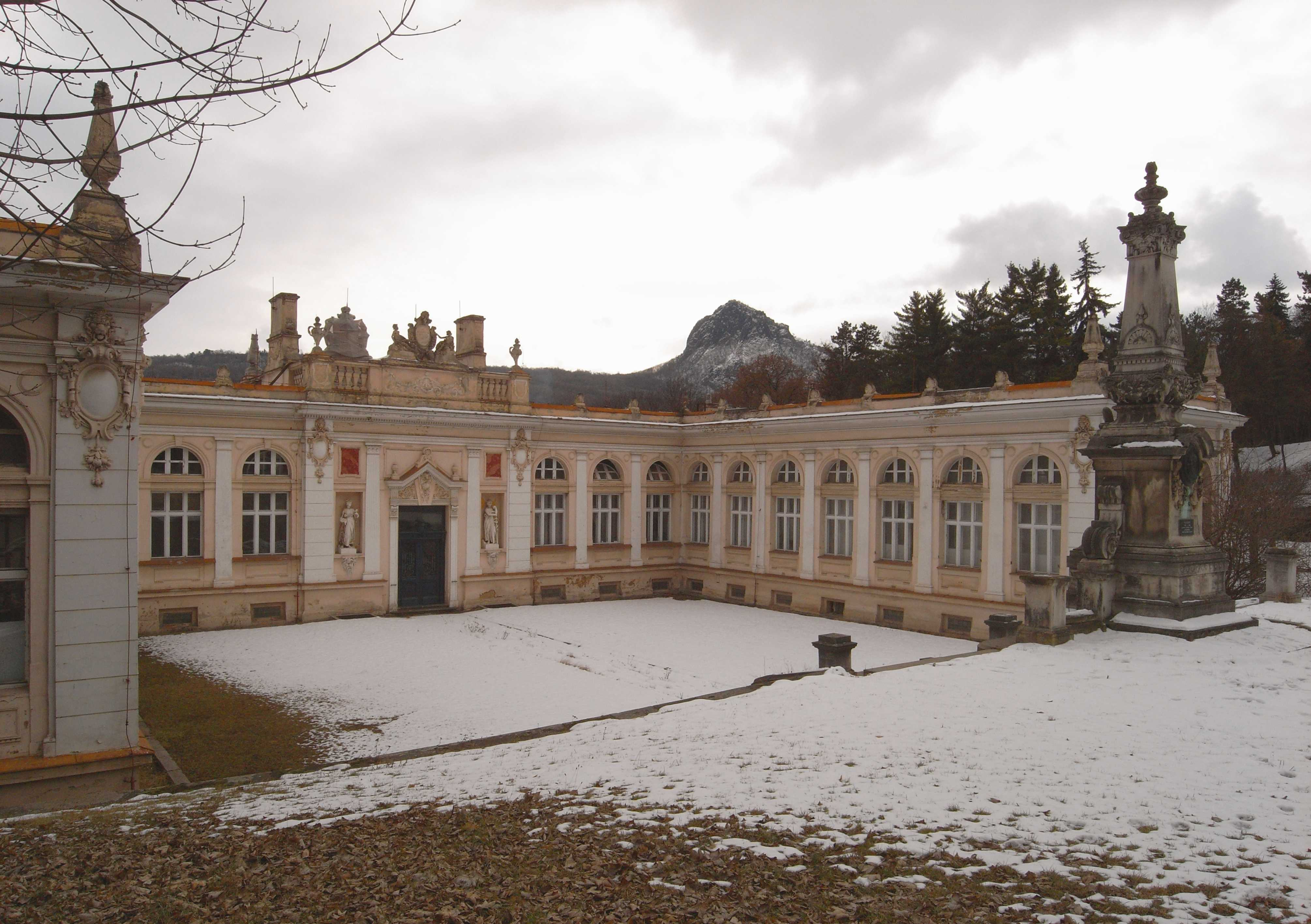
Old spa complex

Local springs of prized mineral water began to be systematically exploited in 1664. Around 1712, Princess Eleonore of Lobkowicz had the mineral spring cleaned and the very first spa guests began to visit.

Scientific descriptions of the medicinal properties of local water treatment have contributed to the works of significant balneologists, including Franz Ambros Reuss and August Emanuel von Reuss and Josef von Löschner. In 1820, mineral water began to be exported abroad. At the beginning of the 20th century, the biggest importers were the German and Russian empires. The most distant country where water was exported was Brazil (Rio de Janeiro).

In 1878, a large spa complex was built in the Neo-Renaissance style, designed by the Lobkowicz family architect and builder Franz Sablik. Above the main spring, called "Joseph's Spring", a so-called spring temple was built, which protected it from the influences of the surroundings and at the same time allowed visitors to gather water as it was common in other European spas. Another building became popular among visitors: Forest Café, built as a timber pavilion in Swiss mountainous style.

== Demographics ==
Historical population

Year	Pop.	±%
1869	5,342	—
1880	7,310	+36.8%
1890	8,952	+22.5%
1900	12,257	+36.9%
1910	14,153	+15.5%

Year	Pop.	±%
1921	14,361	+1.5%
1930	16,586	+15.5%
1950	11,862	−28.5%
1961	13,726	+15.7%
1970	16,196	+18.0%

Year	Pop.	±%
1980	18,836	+16.3%
1991	17,025	−9.6%
2001	15,890	−6.7%
2011	15,401	−3.1%
2021	14,104	−8.4%

Source: Censuses

== Economy ==
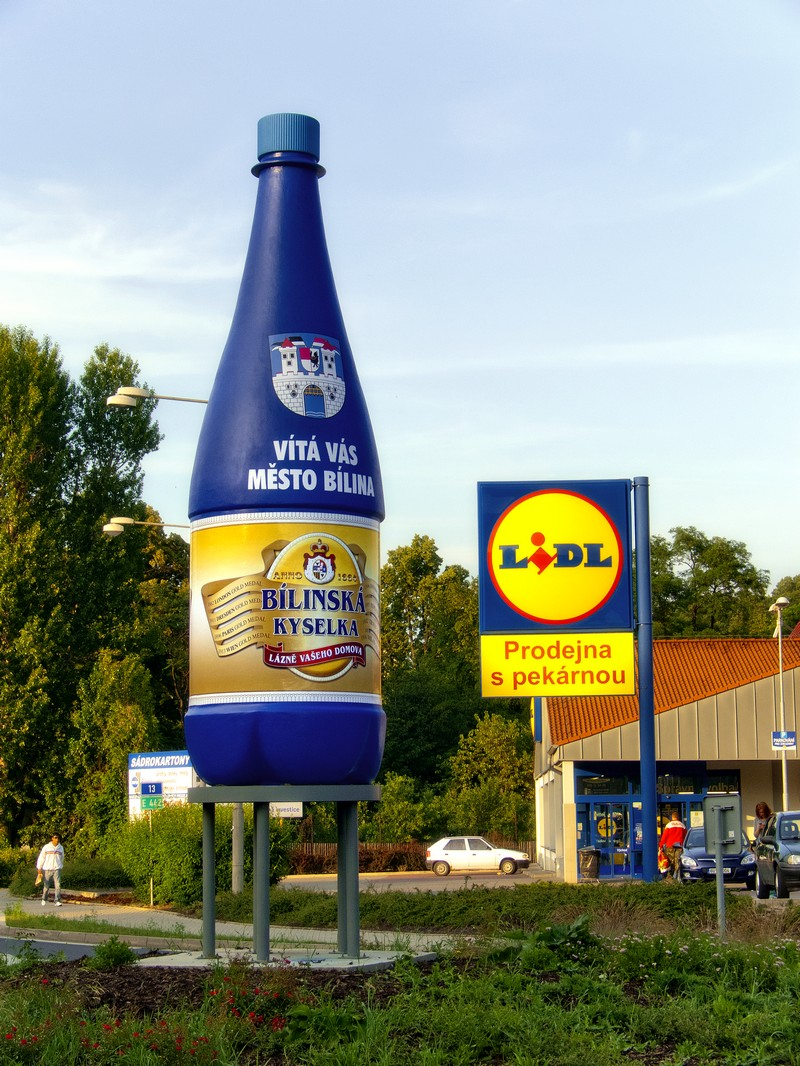
Welcome sign in the shape of a bottle of Bílinská kyselka

The largest employer based in the town is AGC Automotive Czech, engaged in shaping and processing of flat glass. It employs more than 1,500 people. Other large companies with more than 500 employees are Prodeco (manufacturer of machinery for mining and quarrying) and Revitrans (engaged in the rental and maintenance of construction and mining machinery).

Bílina is known for Bílinská kyselka, a strongly mineralised water that is bottled in the town.

== Transport ==
The I/13 road (the section from Most to Teplice, part of the European route E442) passes through the town.

Bílina is located on several important railway lines, including Prague–Cheb and Děčín–Kadaň.

== Sport ==
The town boasts a modern multipurpose stadium and a winter stadium with a capacity of 1,000 people. There is also a swimming pool.

== Sights ==
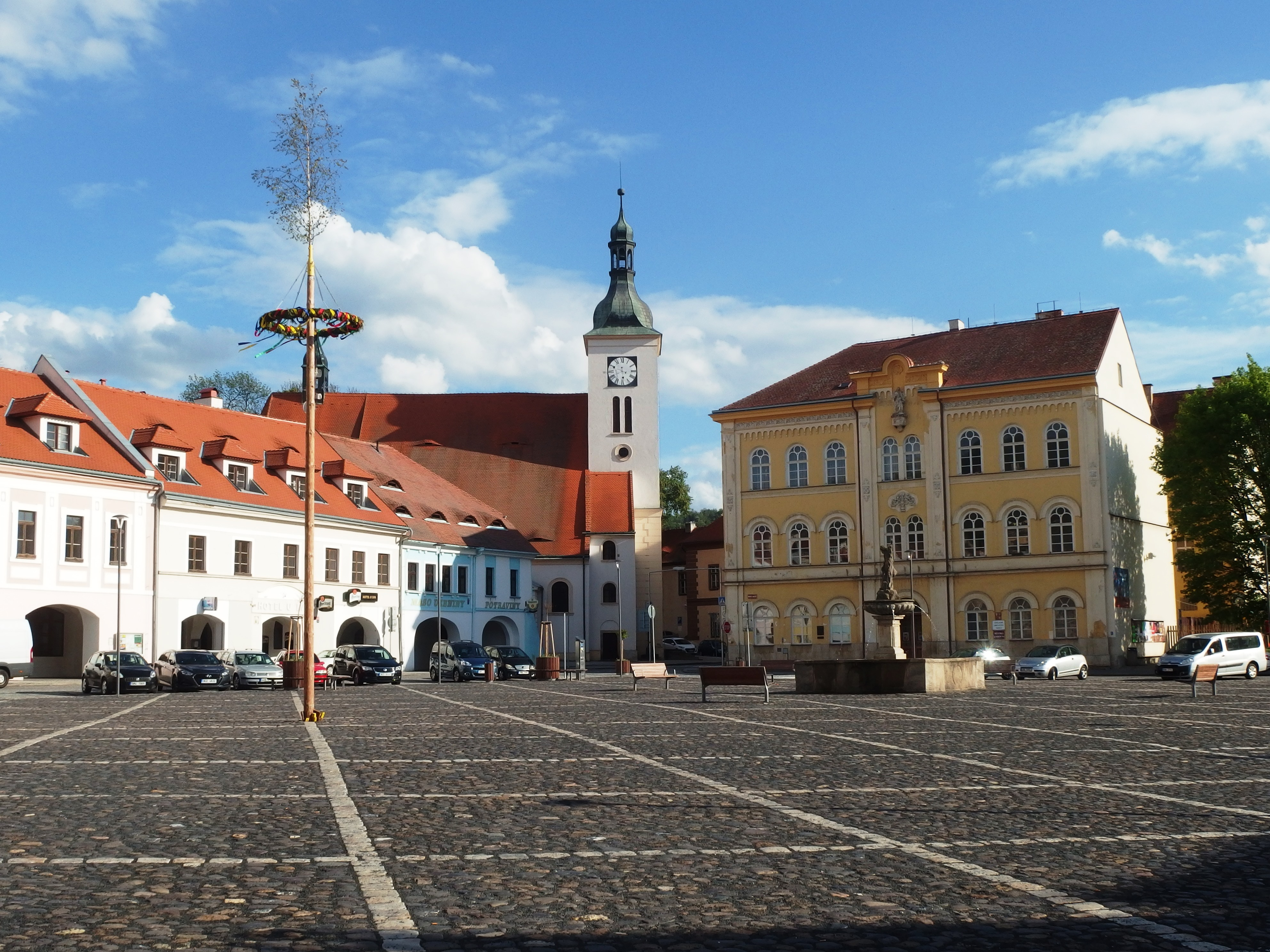
Mírové náměstí with the Church of Saints Peter and Paul

Lobkowicz Castle is a Baroque castle built in the years 1676–1682 on the site of an earlier Gothic castle. A preserved Hussite bastion as a remnant of the massive town fortifications is in the eastern part of the castle complex. The castle is privately owned.

The town hall is a main landmark of the square Mírové náměstí in the historic town centre. It is an Art Nouveau building, built in 1908–1911. The Marian column and the fountain on the square are from the second half of the 17th century.

The Church of Saints Peter and Paul is a parish church and historic monument. The original church was already built by 1061. The entire architecture blends Gothic and Renaissance elements, created during the reconstruction in 1573–1575, after the town was hit by a fire.

Kyselka spa complex includes the spring house of the mineral waters, cafes and natural amphitheatre in a forest setting. In the spa's central park is a memorial to Franz Ambros Reuss and August Emanuel von Reuss. It was created in 1898 and is protected as a cultural monument for its artistic value.

== Notable people ==
- Johann Adalbert Angermayer (1674–1740), painter
- August Emanuel von Reuss (1811–1873), Austrian geologist
- Gustav Walter (1834–1910), Austrian opera singer
- August Leopold von Reuss (1841–1924), Austrian ophthalmologist
- Heinrich Krafft (1914–1942), German flying ace
- Miloslav Stingl (1930–2020), ethnologist, traveller and writer
- Zuzana Mrázová (born 1978), politician, mayor of Bílina in 2018–2025; lives here

== Twin towns – sister cities ==
Bílina is twinned with:

- Biłgoraj, Poland
- Dippoldiswalde, Germany
- Jaraczewo, Poland
- Kobylí, Czech Republic
- Mošćenička Draga, Croatia
- Novovolynsk, Ukraine
- Stropkov, Slovakia
