= Burgstein (disambiguation) =

Burgstein is the name of the following geographical objects:

Places:

- Burgstein, a parish in the district of Vogtlandkreis, Saxony, Germany
- Burgstein (Längenfeld), hamlet in the parish of Huben, municipality of Längenfeld, Tyrol, Austria
- Burgstein (Umhausen), hamlet in the parish of Tumpen, municipality of Umhausen, Tyrol, Austria

Rocks:

- Burgstein (Dollnstein) in the Altmühl valley
- Burgstein (Thuringia) in the Ilm valley
