= Franciscan friary =

Franciscan monastery or Franciscan friary may refer to a great number of locations, including:

- Franciscan Friary, Baja, in Baja, Hungary
- Franciscan Monastery in Kadaň, in Kadaň, Czech Republic
- Mount St. Sepulchre Franciscan Monastery, in Washington, DC, United States
- Buttevant Franciscan Friary, Buttevant, Ireland

For a more complete list, see Category:Franciscan monasteries
