= Reuth =

Reuth may refer to:

== Places in Germany ==
- Reuth, Rhineland-Palatinate, in the Vulkaneifel district, Rhineland-Palatinate
- Reuth, Saxony, in the Vogtlandkreis district, Saxony
- Reuth bei Erbendorf, in the district of Tirschenreuth, Bavaria

== People ==
- Ralf Georg Reuth (born 1952), German journalist and historian

== See also ==
- Reuthe, a municipality in Bregenz, Vorarlberg, Austria
