= Franciscan Monastery in Kadaň =

Coordinates: 50°22′44″N 13°15′30″E

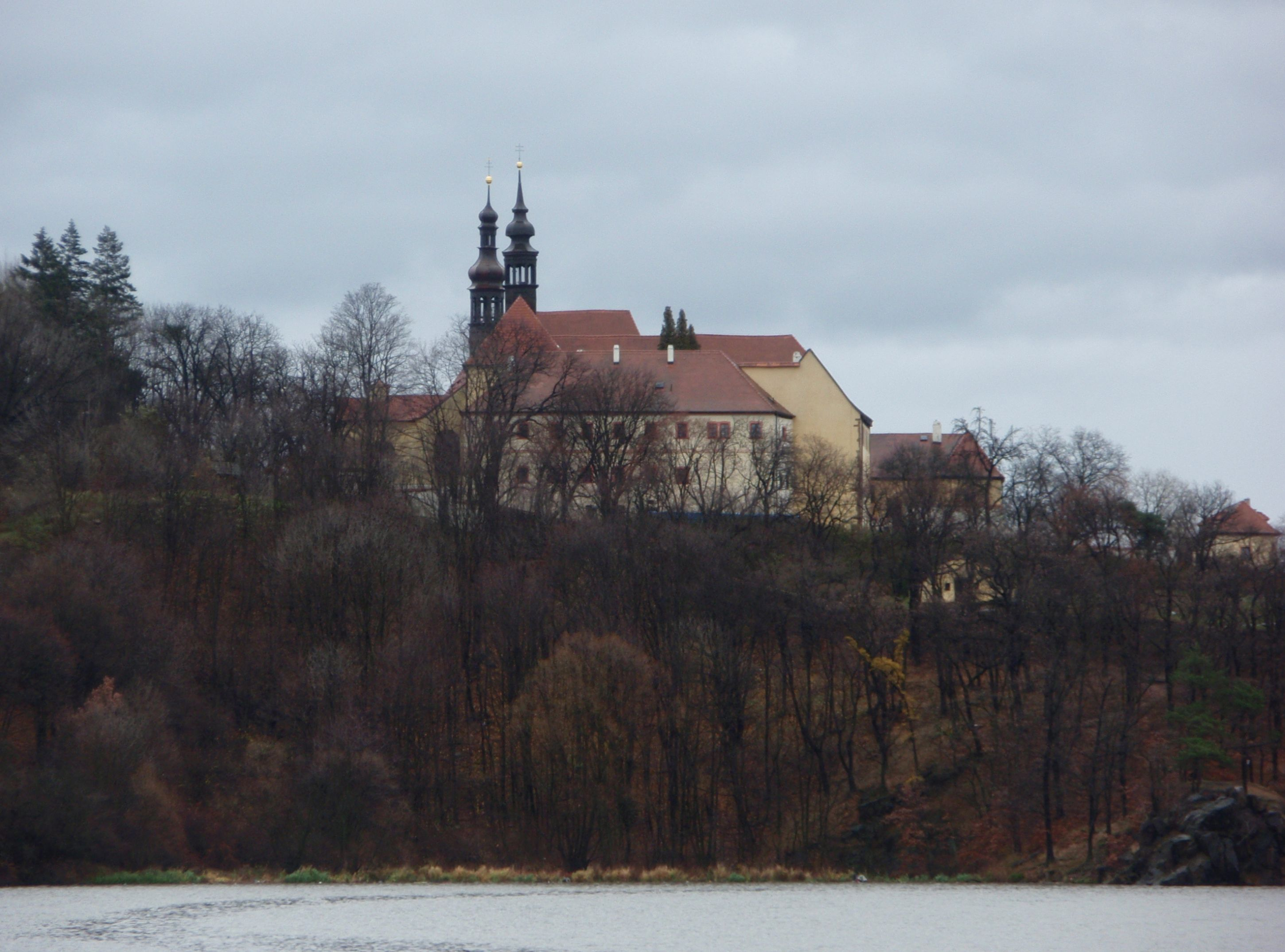
The Franciscan Monastery

The Franciscan Monastery (Czech: Františkánský klášter) lies on the edge of the town of Kadaň, Czech Republic and near the river Ohře. Its history dates back to the 15th century. It is now the seat of the Municipal Museum of Kadaň with an exposition of life in a monastery. The church's dedication to the Fourteen Holy Helpers shows the connection to then popular German shrines of the same cult. Around the building are monastery gardens with a vineyard and a French garden. The monastery was ranked among the national cultural monuments by the Ministry of Culture of the Czech Republic in 1995. The monastery faces the Úhošť hill on the opposite slope of the Ohře valley.

== History ==
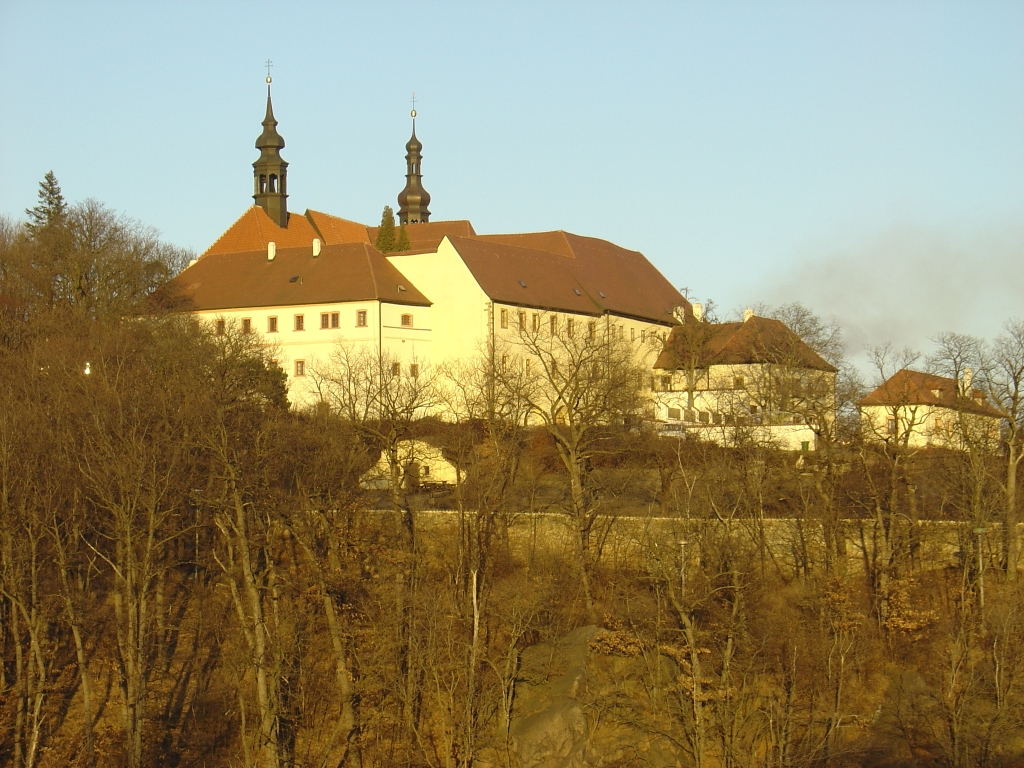
The Franciscan Monastery in early spring

The first building on the site of the present-day Franciscan Monastery in Kadaň was a holy shrine first mentioned in 1469. At Easter 1473 Franciscan Order assumed the shrine and with the support of Kadaň inhabitants and the House of Vitzhum built a temporary Convent house around it with the view of building a stone monastery. The Order experienced a bloom and expansion in Bohemia particularly after the visit of Saint John Capistran. The monastery was built in several periods between 1473 and 1500. The sanctuary of the church with the quadripartite rib vault was built first and it was dedicated by the Hierapolitan bishop and the auxiliary bishop of Regensburg, Johann Ludwig in 1480. The three-aisled nave with sexpartite rib vault was finished in 1493 and dedicated by the bishop of Kamień Pomorski, Benedikt of Valdštejn. The monastery complex was completed around 1500. The walls of the church were decorated with abundant Gothic and Renaissance paintings that are now being restored. The first presumptions show an affinity with the Lucas Cranach school.

In 1481 the monastery was handed over to Jan Hasištejnský of Lobkowicz, who continued its development and is buried there. Its development reached its peak in 1522 when the provincial Franciscan school was established. However, the monastery was abolished in 1564 in connection with the stormy spread of Lutheranism in the area. It was soon reestablished by Jiří Popel z Lobkovic, but was damaged again after the 1618 uprising.

A revival did not come until the second half of the 17th century, when the buildings were renovated and the church received new furniture and fixtures. The 18th century brought several unfavourable events. French soldiers of the anti-Habsburg coalition used the church as their shelter while withdrawing after they had been driven from Prague by the army of Maria Theresa in 1742. The church became a witness to a bloody exchange of gunfire. The riddled Baroque door still evokes those moments.

The monastery narrowly escaped abolition during Joseph II's reforms. The number of monks was, however, limited from thirty-six to twelve.

During World War II the Franciscans had to surrender half of their monastery to the Wehrmacht for Hitlerjugend needs. Communists closed the monastery in 1950 and it was used as a depository of the state district archive and Chomutov museum and got dilapidated due to insufficient maintenance. In 1991 the monastery was given back to Franciscans but they passed it over to the favour of Litoměřice diocese in 1994. The diocesan officials entered into the agreement with the Municipal Office to lease the monastery to the town of Kadaň. The municipality has been giving means to reconstruct the valuable interior and wall frescos. In 1999 the newer parts of the buildings were dedicated to the Primary Music, Dancing and Fine Arts School and a permanent exhibition of mining was opened in the cellars. The Municipal Museum was inaugurated in May 2004.

== Church ==
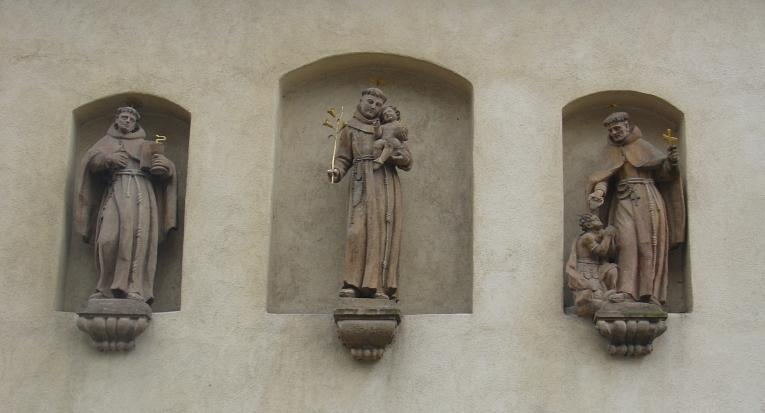
Statues on the wall of the church

The Church is dedicated to the Annunciation of the Lord and to the Fourteen Holy Helpers. It was built in the Late Gothic style with a ribbed vault and the pointed windows. The furniture and equipment is from the Baroque period.

The Franciscans are a mendicant order, which is why they did not own the church and the monastery. Therefore the king owned the buildings (at the time of its erecting Vladislaus II was on the throne) or an aristocrat. In 1481 the dynasty of Lobkowicz became the owners. They had been the baillie holders of Kadaň from 1469. In the sanctuary is their family vault. The secular founder of the monastery is Jan Hasištejnský of Lobkowicz.

The high altar is the dominant feature in the church. On the altar are two statues – on the left the statue of St. Francis of Assisi, the founder of the Franciscan order, and on the right the statue of St. Anthony of Padua, who holds the child Jesus Christ in his hands.

== Diamond vault ==
Several rooms of the monastery are decorated with late Gothic diamond vaults. Such diamond vaults are rare in Bohemia.

== Legend ==
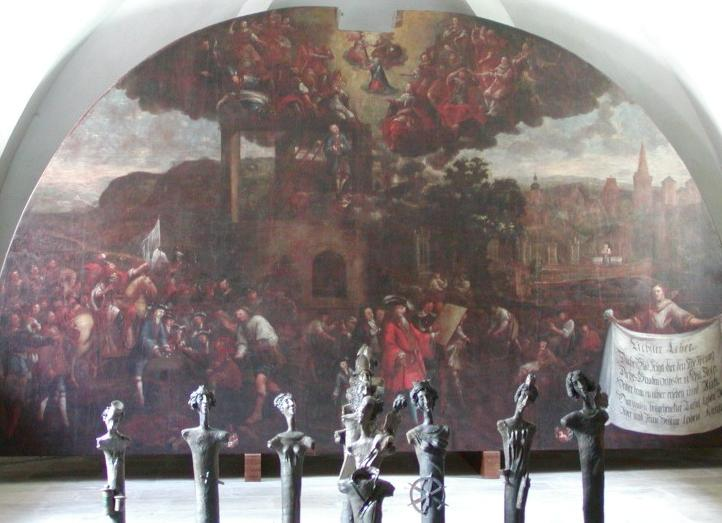
The Baroque picture of the legend

The legend of the inception tells about a noble family whose five brothers once offended the monarch. They should have been executed but the intercessions of Kadaň inhabitants made the monarch have mercy on the future of the family and symbolically punish just one of the brothers. They played at dice to decide who would hang for the others. The lot fell upon the eldest brother who was hanged straight afterwards in the place of execution that is said to have been situated in the site of the monastery. He was hanging there for three days and nights without dying. He was asked by the crowds how it was possible and he explained that he had been praying to Fourteen Holy Helpers. After having heard of the miracle the Kadaň town council came to save the penitent‘s life, take down the gallows and have a shrine to the Helpers built.

Another miracle occurred during the construction. A pregnant lady asked the masons what they were building and when she heard of the Fourteen Holy Helpers she laughed and said that she would rather give birth to fourteen babies than believe in some Holy Helpers‘ existence. After claiming that she went to the town gate (now Holy Gate) and really gave birth to eleven boys and three daughters.

== Via Crucis ==
Seven stations of the Cross lead from the Holy gate to the shrine. They are all sculptured in Baroque style. According to a tradition the journey takes the same length as the way from Pilate‘s house to the Calvary. All the stations depict the falls of Christ.

== Events ==
- Vine Harvest Festival (Saturday closest to St. Wenceslaus Day)
- Beer Festival (of Czech minibreweries)
- Franciscan Summer (all-summer weekends folk and country festival)
- Night in the Museum
- Kirwitzer Day
