= Rittergut Kürbitz =

Coordinates: 50.4617476304651°N 12.0734757184982°E

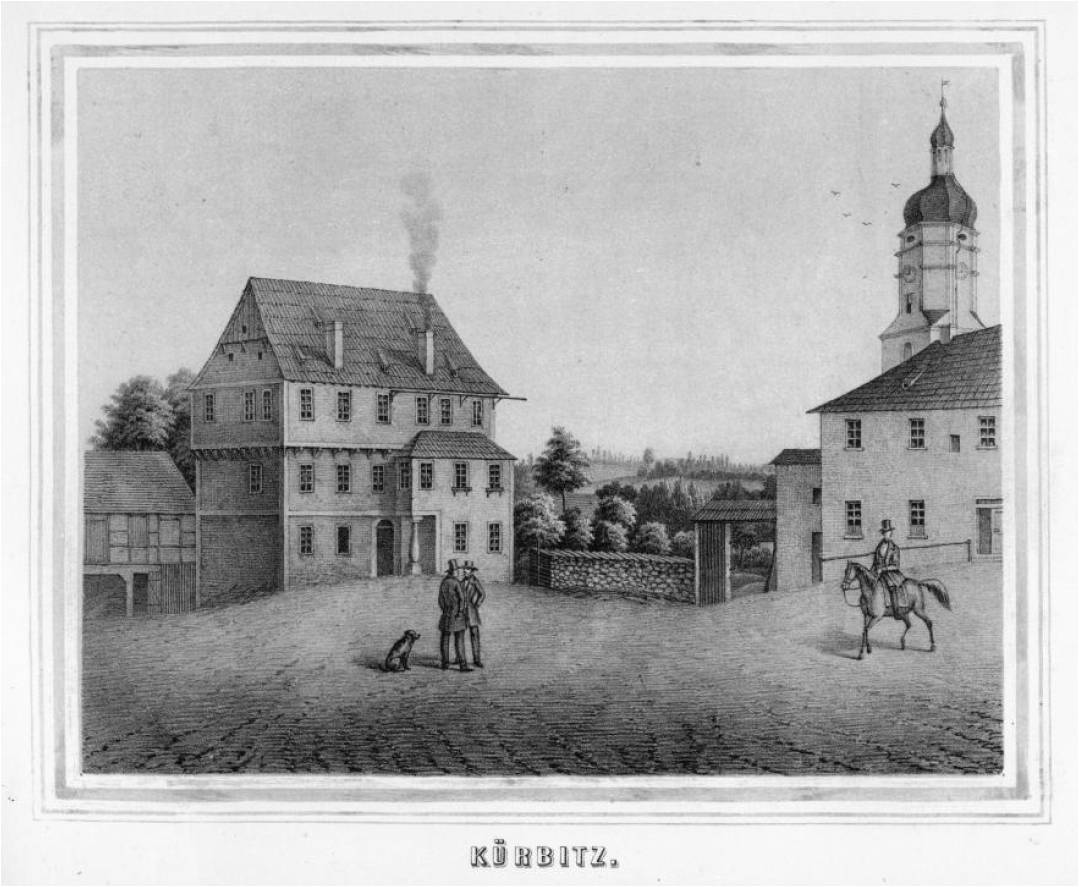
The feudal estate, around 1860

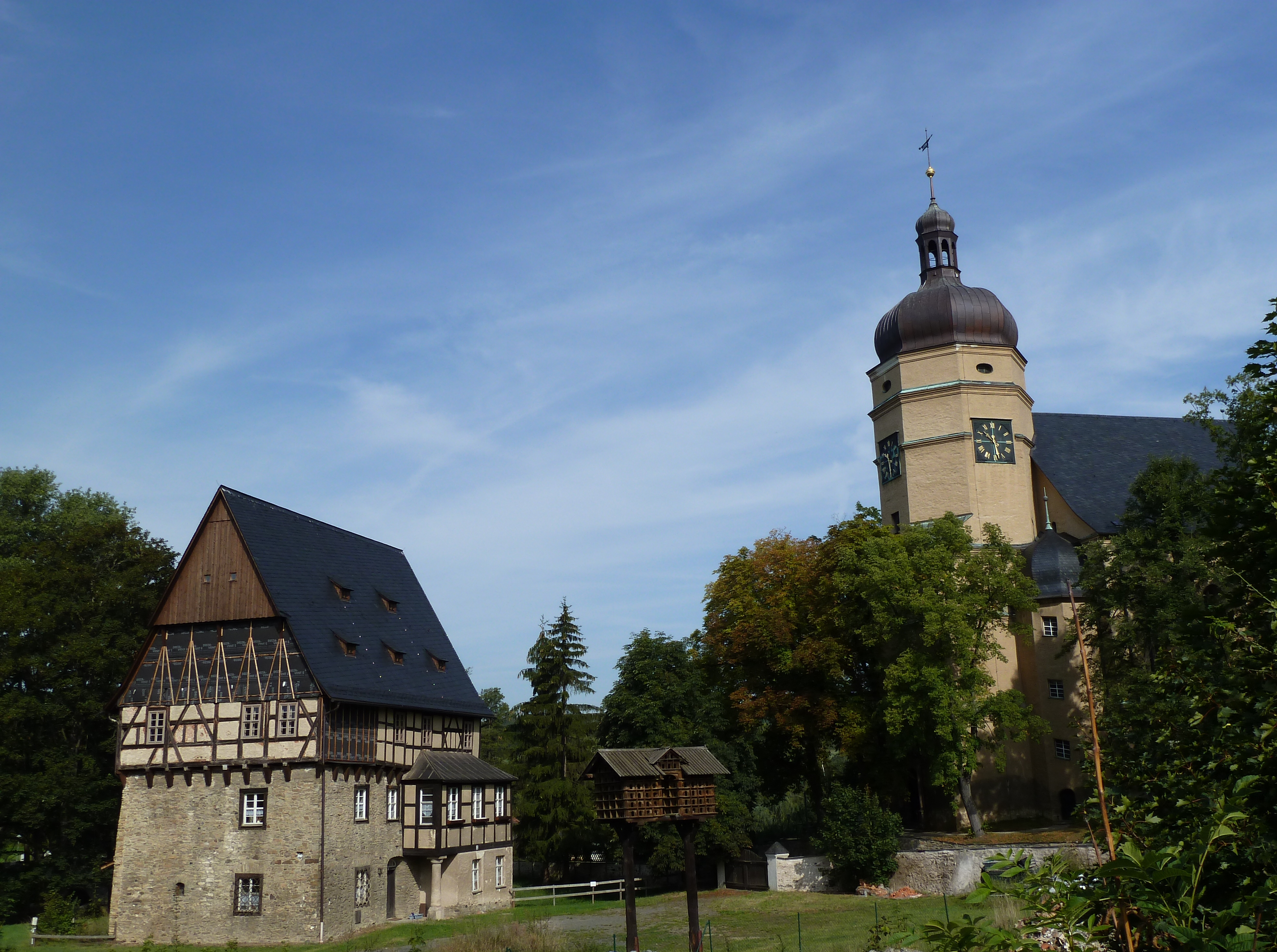
The feudal estate (summer 2011)

The Feudal Estate of Kürbitz, in Vogtland, was a manor of the family of Feilitzsch; only a part of the mansion is extant.

== History ==
Approximately 1300 AD, the Feilitzsch family, named after its ancestral seat near the town of Hof, was one of the large landowners in Kürbitz. In the late 15th century, Jobst of Feilitzsch acquired a number of local estates and founded the feudal estate of Kürbitz. A former water castle, this fortified house at a crossing of the White Elster river later became the mansion of the feudal estate. Until 1945, the estate was in the possession of the family. A prominent personality in the history of the property was Urban Caspar, Baron of Feilitzsch, Margravial Brandenburgian Privy Councillor, chancellor and fief judge. In the 17th century he permitted building alterations to turn the structure into a residential castle, establishing the building form which is still recognizable today. The original medieval residential tower bears an overhanging half-timbered superstructure with a precipitous gable roof. At the beginning of the 19th century the building was enlarged on the northern and eastern sides with hipped roof extensions. The baroque room arrangement inside the house was preserved in essentials. The building was renovated from 1936 to 1938. After the end of World War II the mansion provided housing for expellees. In 1961 the former potato distillery was destroyed by fire due to negligence. Empty economic buildings on the area of the feudal estate went to ruin and were finally torn down. The upper part of the mansion was used as habitation until 1987. The rooms on the ground floor were used as a school kitchen and a local library.

On November 11, 1987, a devastating fire ravaged the upper floor and roof. An immense effort saved the mansion from complete destruction. Soon thereafter, committed inhabitants of Kürbitz installed a temporary roof and thus protected the building from weather decay for the next 20 years.

After German reunification Joachim Baron von Feilitzsch attended to the residence of his forefathers. Since 2005 a booster club has been active to rescue and preserve it. The Förderverein Rittergut Kürbitz e.V. leased the manor house from the community of Weischlitz, owner of the real estate, and also drafted concepts for future use. Many-sided activities led to the awarding of financial grants and thus comprehensive emergency protection of the building could be realized in 2007. The roof and the attic were rebuilt, endangered parts of the masonry were stabilized, and the framework was partially refurbished.

In December 2011 the municipality of Weischlitz put up this listed building for sale by tender.
