= Kadaň =

- Town
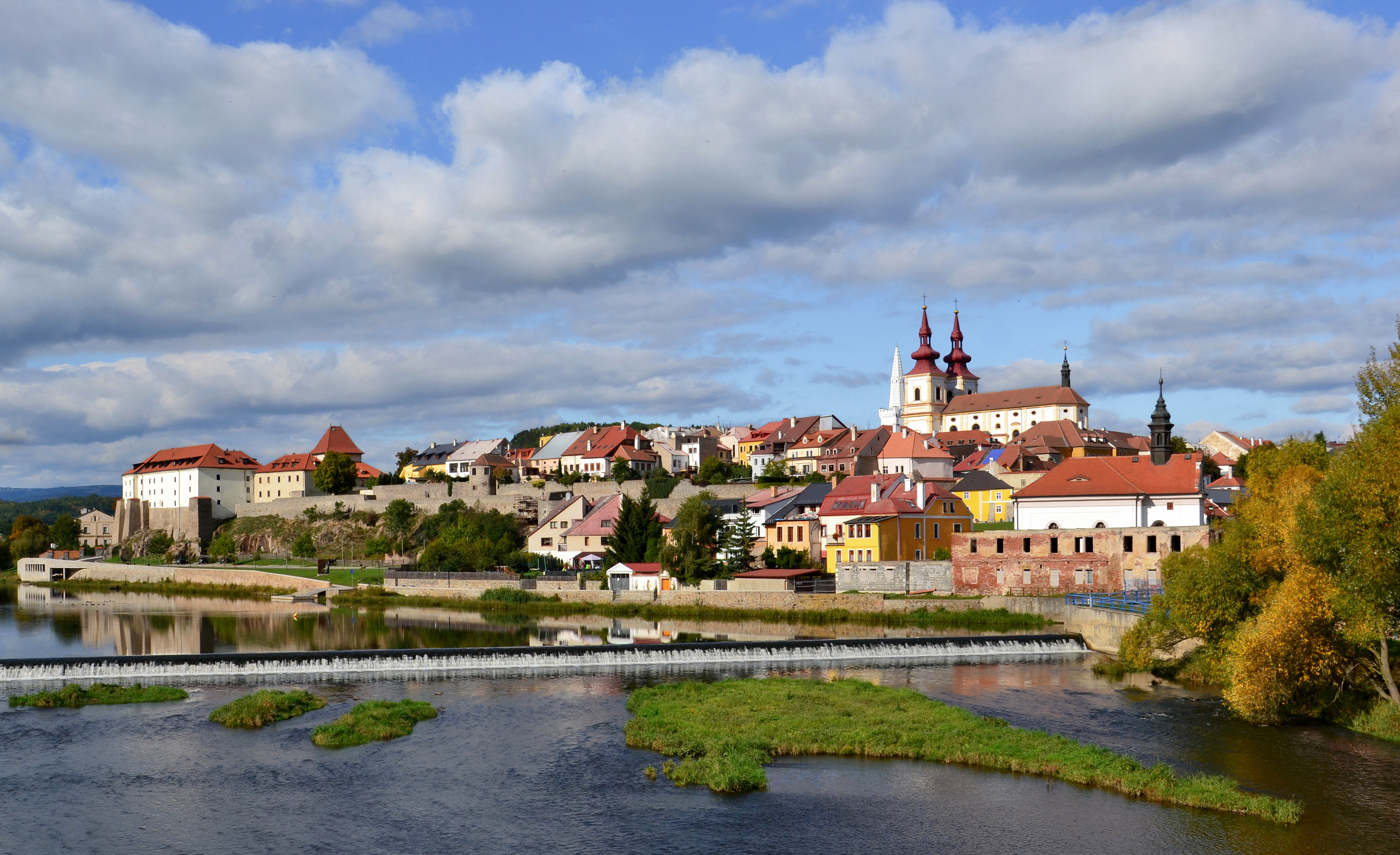
- Panorama of the town with the Ohře River

- Flag Coat of arms

- Location in the Czech Republic
- Coordinates: 50°22′34″N 13°16′17″E
- Country: Czech Republic
- Region: Ústí nad Labem
- District: Chomutov
- First mentioned: 1183

Government
  - Mayor: Jan Losenický

Area
  - Total: 65.62 km^{2} (25.34 sq mi)
- Elevation: 300 m (980 ft)

Population (2026-01-01)
  - Total: 18,088
  - Density: 275.6/km^{2} (713.9/sq mi)
- Time zone: UTC+1 (CET)
  - Summer (DST): UTC+2 (CEST)
- Postal code: 432 01
- Website: www.mesto-kadan.cz

Kadaň (Czech pronunciation: [ˈkadaɲ]; German: Kaaden) is a town in Chomutov District in the Ústí nad Labem Region of the Czech Republic. It has about 18,000 inhabitants. The town is located on the banks of the Ohře River and is known as a tourist centre.

Kadaň was probably founded at the turn of the 11th and 12th centuries and became a town around 1260. The historic town centre is well preserved and is protected as an urban monument reservation. The most important monuments, protected as national cultural monuments, are the Franciscan Monastery and the late Gothic town hall.

== Administrative division ==
Kadaň consists of ten municipal parts (in brackets population according to the 2021 census):

- Kadaň (16,478)
- Brodce (20)
- Kadaňská Jeseň (114)
- Meziříčí (7)
- Nová Víska (6)
- Pokutice (39)
- Prunéřov (252)
- Tušimice (351)
- Úhošťany (113)
- Zásada u Kadaně (6)

== Etymology ==
The name is most likely derived from the personal name Kadan, meaning "Kadan's (court)".

== Geography ==
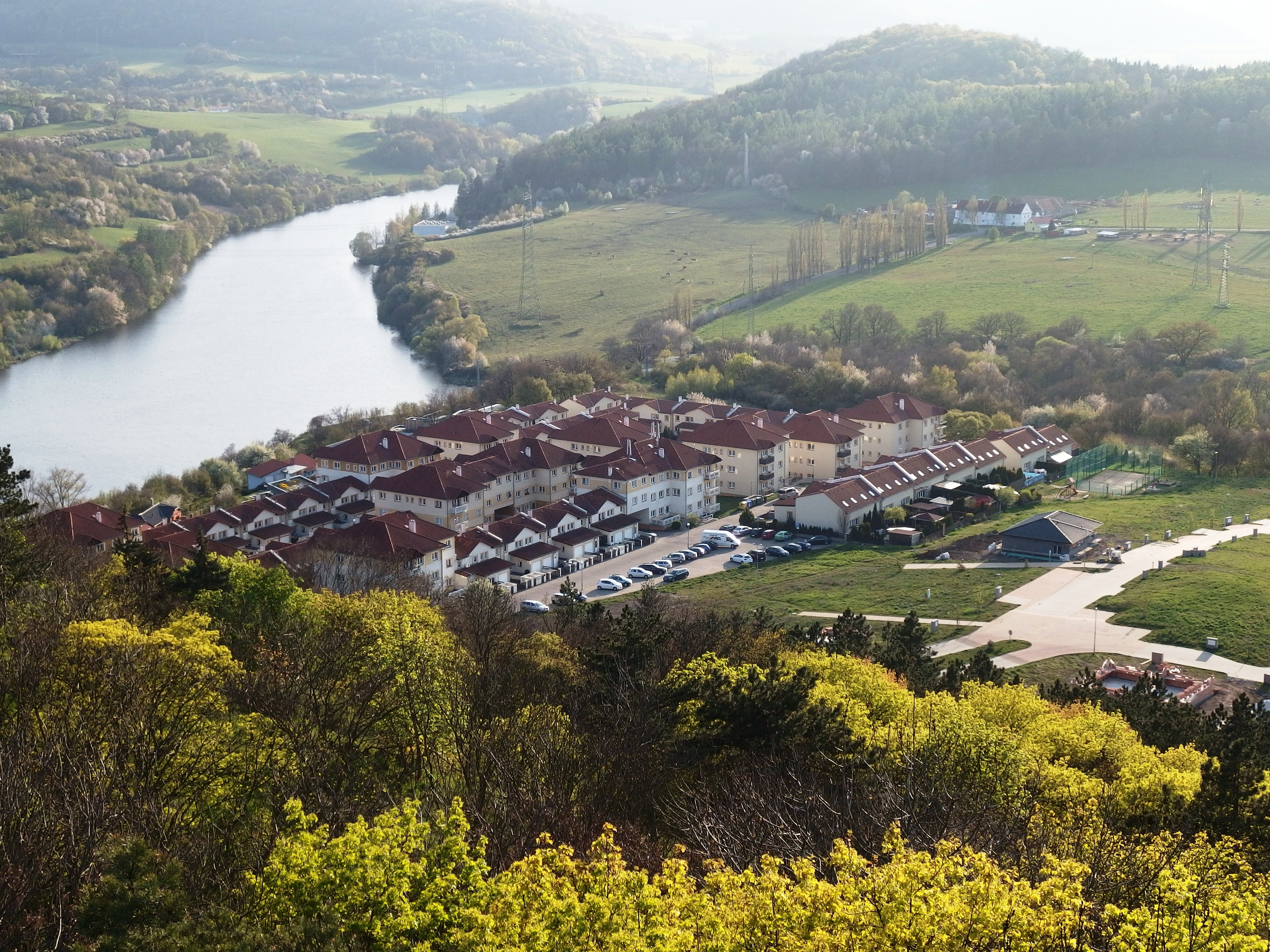
Kadaň Reservoir

Kadaň is located about 13 kilometres (8 mi) southwest of Chomutov and 31 km (19 mi) northeast of Karlovy Vary. It lies on the border between the Most Basin and Doupov Mountains. The northern tip of the municipal territory extends into the Ore Mountains. The highest point is the hill Dubový vrch at 691 m (2,267 ft) above sea level, located on the southern border of the territory. A notable feature is also the Úhošť hill, which is together with its surroundings protected as a national nature reserve.

Kadaň is situated on the banks of the Ohře River. On the Ohře is built Kadaň Reservoir with an area of 67.2 ha (166 acres). It was completed in 1972. Its main purpose is to ensure a minimum flow under the reservoir, but it also serves for the energy use and for recreation and water sports.

=== Climate ===
Climate data for Tušimice (1991–2020)
Month	Jan	Feb	Mar	Apr	May	Jun	Jul	Aug	Sep	Oct	Nov	Dec	Year
Record high °C (°F)	16.6 (61.9)	19.3 (66.7)	22.1 (71.8)	27.8 (82.0)	31.6 (88.9)	36.7 (98.1)	36.7 (98.1)	37.9 (100.2)	31.6 (88.9)	25.6 (78.1)	19.4 (66.9)	14.3 (57.7)	37.9 (100.2)
Mean daily maximum °C (°F)	2.4 (36.3)	4.4 (39.9)	9.0 (48.2)	15.1 (59.2)	19.5 (67.1)	22.8 (73.0)	25.1 (77.2)	25.0 (77.0)	19.6 (67.3)	13.1 (55.6)	6.8 (44.2)	3.1 (37.6)	13.8 (56.8)
Daily mean °C (°F)	−0.2 (31.6)	0.8 (33.4)	4.3 (39.7)	9.3 (48.7)	13.8 (56.8)	17.2 (63.0)	19.1 (66.4)	18.5 (65.3)	13.7 (56.7)	8.6 (47.5)	4.0 (39.2)	0.7 (33.3)	9.1 (48.4)
Mean daily minimum °C (°F)	−2.8 (27.0)	−2.3 (27.9)	0.5 (32.9)	3.8 (38.8)	8.1 (46.6)	11.6 (52.9)	13.5 (56.3)	13.0 (55.4)	9.2 (48.6)	5.1 (41.2)	1.5 (34.7)	−1.7 (28.9)	5.0 (41.0)
Record low °C (°F)	−19.2 (−2.6)	−17.7 (0.1)	−13.6 (7.5)	−6.9 (19.6)	−1.1 (30.0)	1.8 (35.2)	5.4 (41.7)	5.1 (41.2)	−0.2 (31.6)	−8.2 (17.2)	−10.6 (12.9)	−21.0 (−5.8)	−21.0 (−5.8)
Average precipitation mm (inches)	23.4 (0.92)	16.7 (0.66)	24.6 (0.97)	25.0 (0.98)	49.4 (1.94)	58.7 (2.31)	64.6 (2.54)	55.6 (2.19)	42.1 (1.66)	32.1 (1.26)	30.4 (1.20)	30.0 (1.18)	452.5 (17.81)
Average precipitation days (≥ 1.0 mm)	6.4	4.7	6.8	5.8	8.4	8.5	9.1	7.9	6.9	6.9	6.8	6.9	85.1
Mean monthly sunshine hours	46.9	79.7	122.0	182.6	208.3	216.1	229.2	224.4	157.8	95.0	44.3	38.5	1,644.7
Source: NOAA

== History ==
In the Bronze Age, the plateau on the Úhošť hill was inhabited, on which there was a Celtic hillfort. According to some theories, the Wogastisburg Castle stood here, which was the scene of the Battle of Wogastisburg between Franks and Slavs in 631.

=== 11th–18th centuries ===
The first written mention of Kadaň is from 1183. It was probably founded as a market settlement during the colonisation of the area at the turn of the 11th and 12th centuries. In 1186, Duke Frederick donated the settlement to the Knights Hospitaller. Around 1260, Kadaň was promoted to a free royal town and the castle was built. An extensive fire in 1362 destroyed the town and the castle, but everything was restored and supplemented with better fortifications. However, King Charles IV granted it several municipal rights (a vineyard, and an annual market) that made it flourish again.

In 1421, during the Hussite Wars, the town was conquered by the Hussites, who controlled it until the end of the wars. From the mid-15th century, the town was pledged to various creditors of the royal chamber. The most notable of them was the Lobkowicz family, who held the town from 1469 to 1519. Jan Hasištejnský of Lobkowicz founded the Franciscan Monastery and the Church of the Fourteen Holy Helpers.

In 1534, "Kadaň religious peace" was negotiated here between Württemberg Protestants and Emperor Ferdinand I for the Catholic side. After the Battle of White Mountain in 1620, violent re-Catholicisation began in Kadaň. During the Thirty Years' War, in 1631, 1635 and 1648, Kadaň suffered from fires and plundering by various armies. The Kadaň Castle remained a ruin until the second half of the 18th century, when it was rebuilt into barracks by Empress Maria Theresa.

=== 19th–20th centuries ===
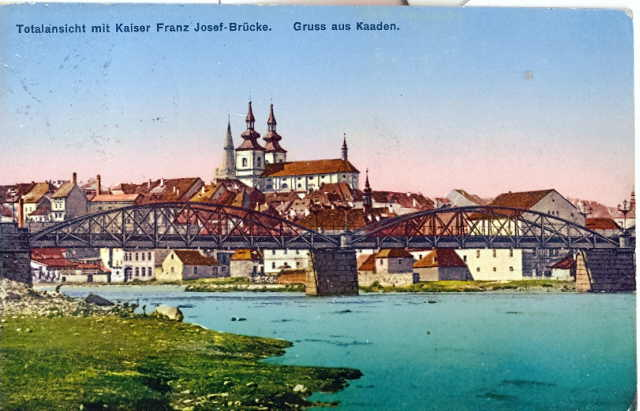
Kadaň seen from the river before 1923

The last great fire damaged the town in 1811. After the Revolution of 1848, the town became a district centre. The institute of the district town lasted in Kadaň for 110 years when it was affiliated with Chomutov District.

After Czechoslovakia was established in 1918 and Kadaň became its part, most of the Sudeten German disagreed with this decision. On 4 March 1919, they demonstrated for self determination and joining Austria. The Czechoslovak military forces were sent in and tried to control the crowd by shooting. The result of the so-called Kadaň massacre was at least 25 dead and dozens injured.

After the Munich Agreement in 1938, Kadaň was annexed by Nazi Germany and administered as part of Reichsgau Sudetenland. The local Czechs were forced to move to central Czechoslovakia and the Jewish community was sent to concentration camps in Germany. The synagogue was burned down during the Kristallnacht of 9 November 1939. According to Beneš decrees, after World War II, the German population was expelled and the area was re-settled by Czechs.

== Demographics ==
Historical population

Year	Pop.	±%
1869	8,262	—
1880	10,368	+25.5%
1890	11,081	+6.9%
1900	11,999	+8.3%
1910	13,186	+9.9%

Year	Pop.	±%
1921	12,974	−1.6%
1930	13,480	+3.9%
1950	7,908	−41.3%
1961	10,010	+26.6%
1970	15,624	+56.1%

Year	Pop.	±%
1980	18,614	+19.1%
1991	17,796	−4.4%
2001	17,579	−1.2%
2011	17,604	+0.1%
2021	17,386	−1.2%

Source: Censuses

== Economy ==
Although Kadaň is situated in an industrial part of the Czech Republic, there is no major industry within the town. Tourism and services play an important role in the town's economy. There are two large power plants in the outskirts of the town, Tušimice Power Station and Prunéřov Power Station. The largest employers based in the town are the Kadaň Hospital, Hunter Douglas (a manufacturer of window coverings) and SD – Kolejová doprava (transporter of coal by rail).

== Transport ==
Kadaň is served by four train stations and stops, located on the Kadaň–Děčín railway line.

== Culture ==
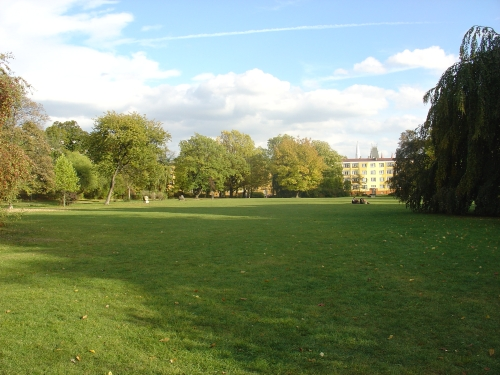
Smetanovy sady Park

The most popular annual cultural event in Kadaň is Císařský den ("Emperor's day"), which commemorates the arrival of Emperor Charles IV into the town in 1367 and 1374. The historically tuned festival is accompanied by a music and theatre program on stage, a show of crafts and period costumes, games for children and others.

Other annual events held in the town include:

- Maxipes Fík Birthday
- Kirwitzer Day
- Old Czech Carnival
- Franciscan Summer
- Vine Harvest Festival
- Vysmáté léto – Summer Music Fest
- Nativity Play
- Passion of Christ Play

== Religion ==
There are churches and chapels of four Christian denominations: Roman Catholic Church, Czechoslovak Hussite Church, Evangelical Church of Czech Brethren and Eastern Orthodox Church.

== Education ==
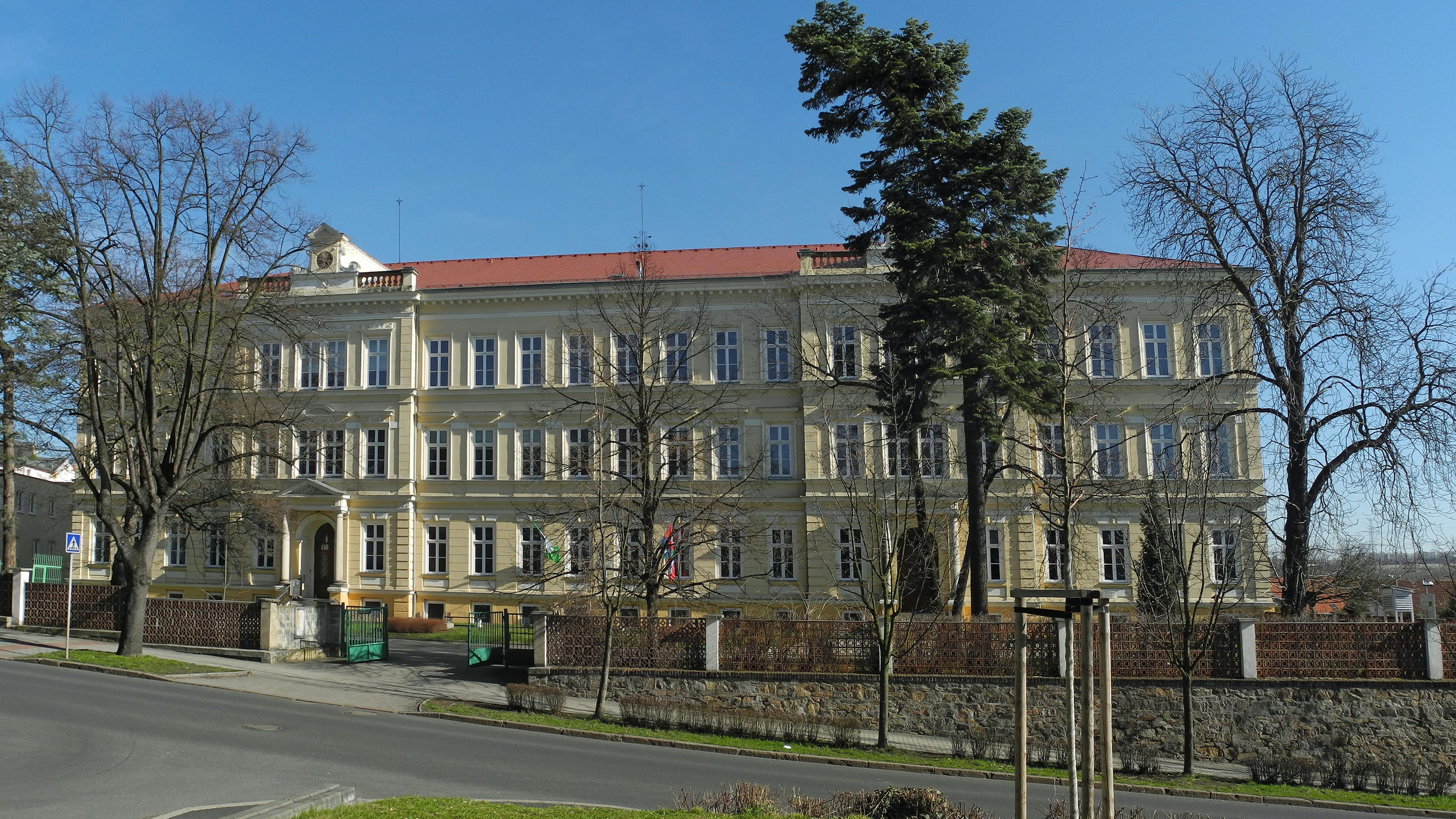
Gymnasium

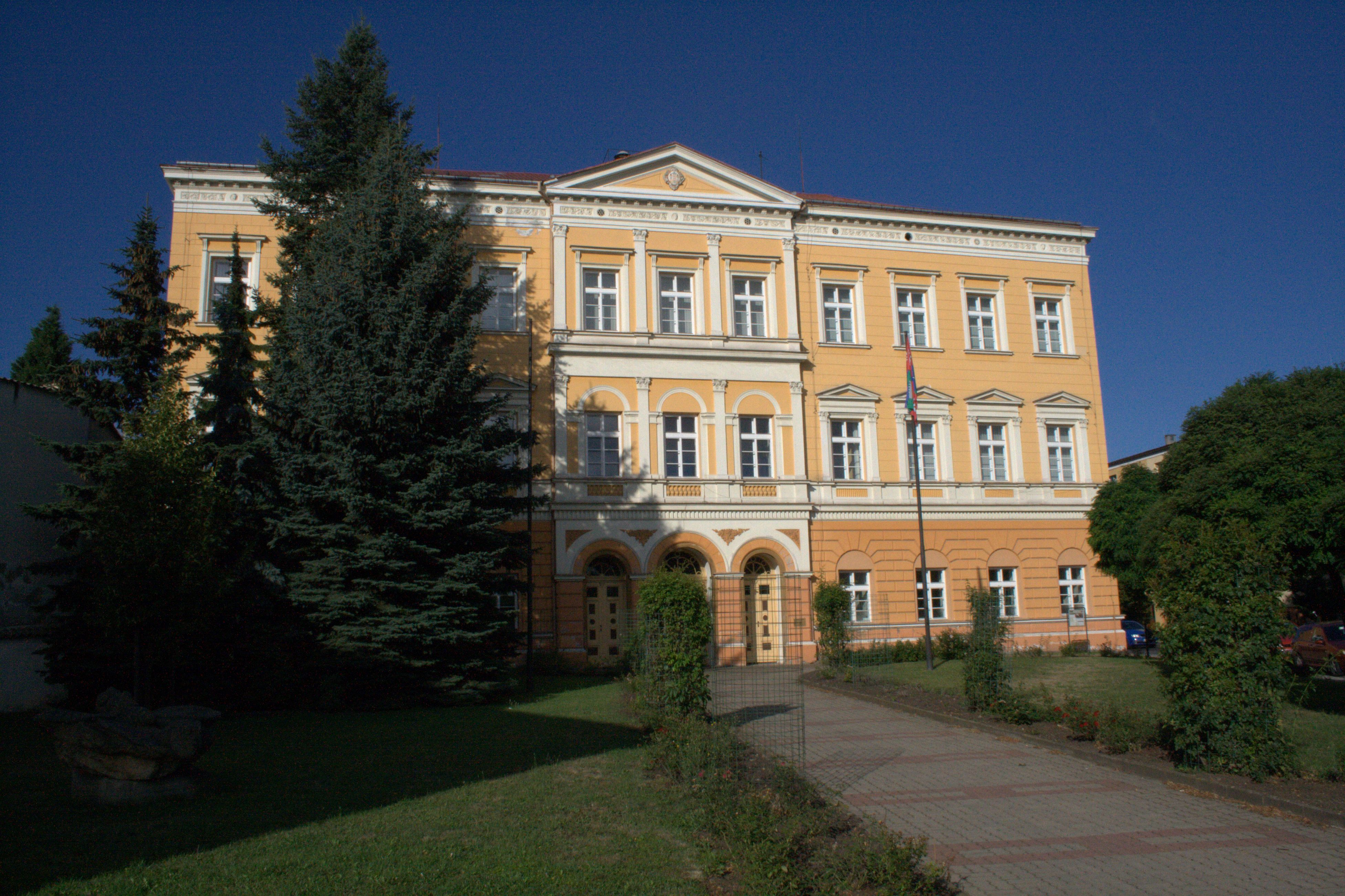
Industrial school

Kadaň is home to two secondary schools: Gymnasium Kadaň, and Secondary Industrial School of Construction and Business Academy.

The Gymnasium Kadaň was established in 1803 with 99 students and continued under the control of the Piarists until 1823. The seat of the old gymnasium was a former Minorite monastery in a building which is now the seat of the Regional Archive. The institute of gymnasium was then reestablished in 1872 in a new building. The gymnasium was closed again in 1951 and the new Industrial School moved to the building. It is still there today. A new gymnasium was established in 1968 and has remained on the same premises since 1978.

There are four primary schools and a school for handicapped children, managed by the town.

== Sport ==
The town is home to an ice hockey club SK Kadaň, which plays in the 1st Czech Republic Hockey League (2nd tier).

== Sights ==
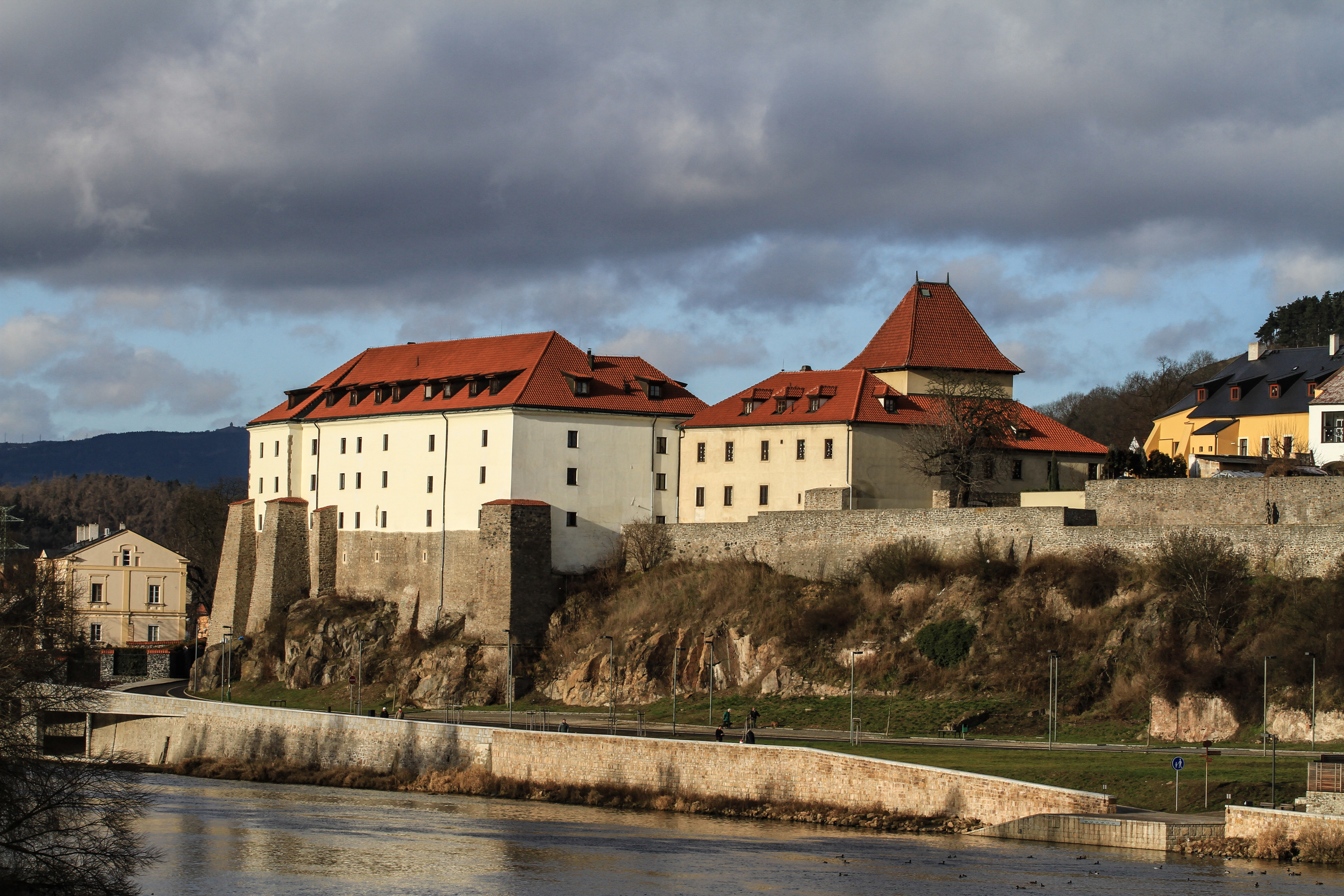
Kadaň Castle

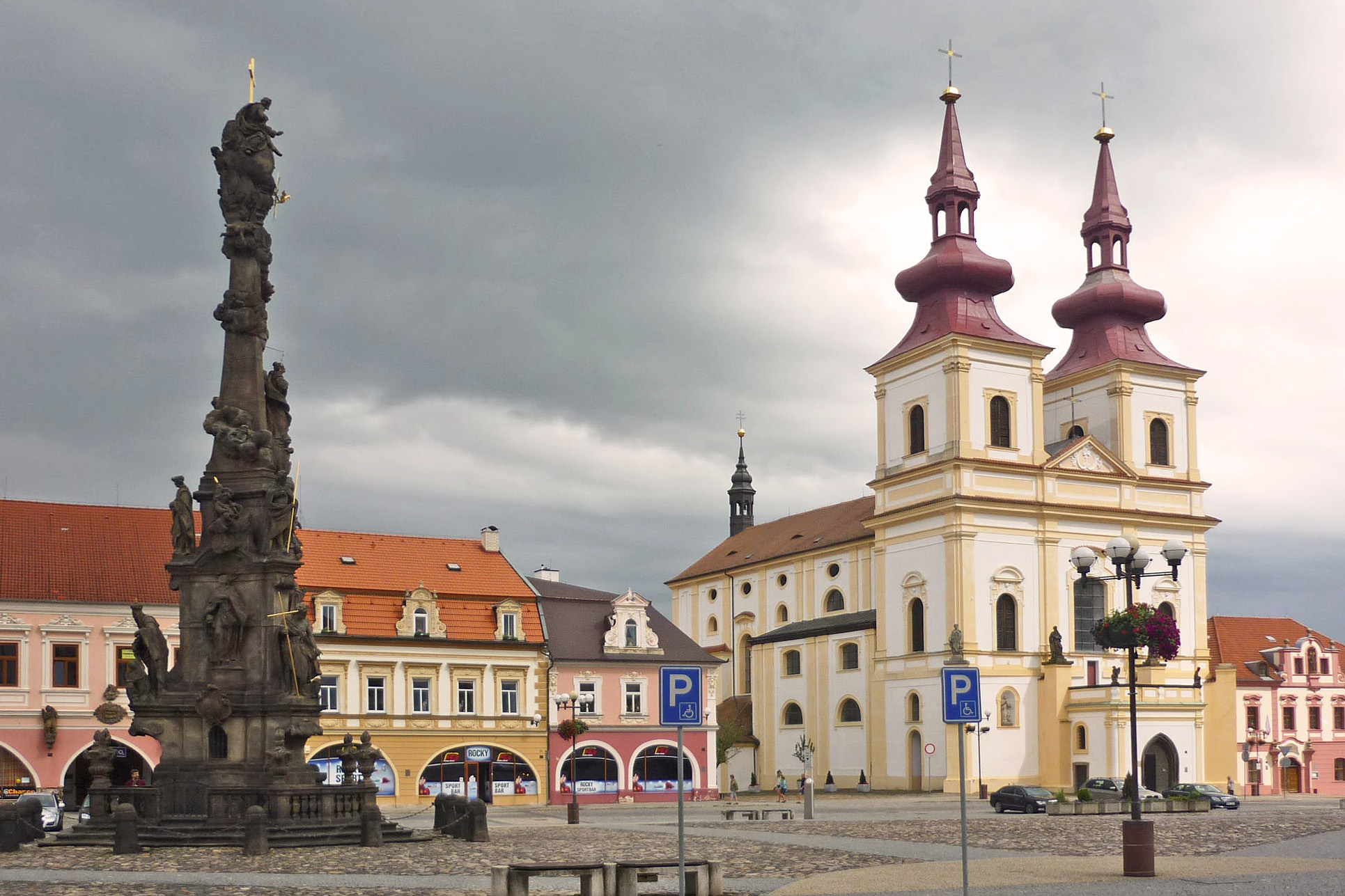
Mírové náměstí with the Church of the Exaltation of the Holy Cross

The Franciscan Monastery in Kadaň with the Church of the Fourteen Holy Helpers was founded in the 15th century by Jan Hasištejnský of Lobkowicz, who is buried there. It is a national cultural monument with unique murals and rare cellar vault. It also includes gardens with a vineyard. Due to the uniqueness of world importance, an application was submitted for its inclusion in the list of UNESCO World Heritage Sites. The monastery complex is a centre of cultural events and also serves as a museum.

Kadaň Castle is a core of the preserved town fortifications, which surrounds the entire historic centre of the town. It was an early Gothic castle founded around 1260, rebuilt into late Gothic and Renaissance styles in the 16th century. It contains an exposition about its history. Another part of the fortification is the barbican of the original Žatec Gate, one of the four main town gates. It was built in 1458 and is one of the oldest defensive structures of its kind in Central Europe.

The square Mírové náměstí and its surroundings form the historic town centre. The town hall was built in the second half of the 14th century. After 1500, it was rebuilt in the late Gothic style. In the mid-18th century, Baroque modifications were made. The building still serves its original purpose and is one of the best preserved Gothic town halls in the Lands of the Bohemian Crown. Since 2024, it has been protected as a national cultural monument.

One of the most known landmarks and symbols of the town is the Town Hall Tower. It was built in the 16th century and is the highest building in the town with 53.75 metres (176.3 ft). It is open to the public as a lookout tower. The town square also include the Church of the Exaltation of the Holy Cross, the Holy Trinity column and a Baroque fountain, which is called Šlikovský pond due to its size.

The Church of the Exaltation of the Holy Cross was founded in 1289. The originally Gothic church was rebuilt in the Baroque style in the second half of the 17th century. Its present appearance is the result of the reconstruction after the fire in 1811.

From the square leads the narrowest lane in the Czech Republic, Katova ulička (meaning 'hangman's alley'). At its narrowest point, it is only 66 centimetres (2.17 ft) wide. It is about 50 metres (160 ft) long.

== In literature ==
Benjamin Constant set a part of his famous novel Adolphe (1816) in Kadaň, referring to it as Caden, petite ville de la Bohême.

== Notable people ==
- Mikuláš of Kadaň (1350–1419), clockmaker
- Peter Nigri (1434–1481 or 1484), theologian
- Jan Hasištejnský of Lobkowicz (1450–1517), traveller, diplomat and writer
- Wenceslas Pantaleon Kirwitzer (1588–1626), astronomer
- Josef von Löschner (1809–1888), Austrian medical doctor
- Anton Graf von Wolkenstein-Trostburg (1832–1913), Austro-Hungarian diplomat
- Theodor Innitzer (1875–1955), cardinal, Archbishop of Vienna
- Edward Goll (1884–1949), pianist and music teacher
- Hans Zeisel (1905–1992), German-American sociologist
- Karel Havlíček (1907–1988), painter
- Josef Dvořák (born 1942), actor
- Petr Klíma (born 1964), ice hockey player
- Ondřej Kaše (born 1995), ice hockey player
- Dominik Feri (born 1996), politician
- Aneta Lédlová (born 1996), ice hockey player
- Jan Zabystřan (born 1998), alpine skier
- Amálie Švábíková (born 1999), pole vaulter

== Twin towns – sister cities ==
Kadaň is twinned with:

- Aue-Bad Schlema, Germany
- Halle, Belgium
- Vara, Sweden
