= Battle of Wogastisburg =

Battle in which Slavs defeated Francia

Siege of Wogastisburg
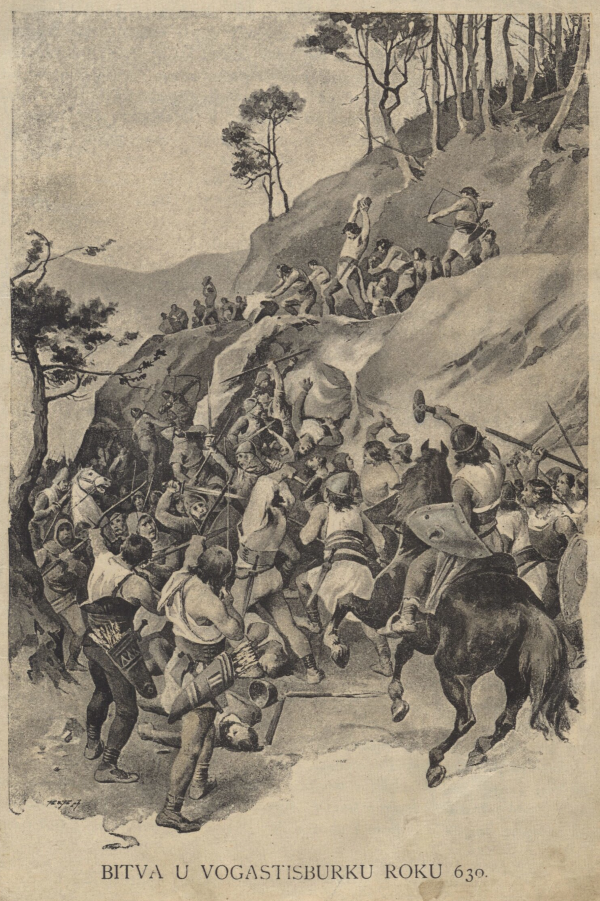
- Věnceslav Černý: Battle of Vogastisburg in 630 (Picture History of the Czech Nation, 1893)
Date	631 / 632
Location	Wogastisburg
Result	Slavic victory
Territorial changes	Enlargement of Samo's realm

Belligerents
Samo's Empire	Frankish Empire

Commanders and leaders
Samo; Dervan	Dagobert I

Casualties and losses
Unknown	Unknown, most likely larger

According to the contemporary Chronicle of Fredegar, the Battle of Wogastisburg (also called the siege of Wogastisburg) was an engagement of Slavic tribesmen (Sclav, cognomento Winidi) led by Samo fighting the Franks led by Dagobert I in 631 or 632. The Frankish armies advanced into the area of the Slavic tribal union in three groups – Alamanni, Lombards, and Austrasian Franks. The first two were successful, but the main fighting force was defeated in a three-day siege near a place referred to as Wogastisburg.

The location of the siege has not been determined because the primary source, Fredegar's chronicle, gives no geographical specifications. Several places claim to be connected with the battle (usually based on linguistic parallels and some excavations), for example Rubín hill near Podbořany (Bohemia), Úhošť hill near Kadaň (Bohemia), Bratislava (Slovakia), Trenčín (Slovakia), Beckov (Slovakia), Váh river near Voga (Slovakia), Staffelberg near Bad Staffelstein (Upper Franconia), and Burk near Forchheim (Upper Franconia), Vienna, Augustianis. (Note: Jan Cinert has several arguments for position of Wogastisburg in Roman camp Augustianis, today Traismauer. He says: So called Fredegar wrote in vulgar latin, for which shift of diphthong Au to O is very common. With the fact, that the root of the name shifted to germanic gast (guest, buyer), the name August(-ian-is) could change to *Ogast(-is)-. After adding prothetic W- and another root -burg with meaning of "raised and defended", later "fortified place" could lead to the name Wogastisburg.)

There is no conclusive evidence for any of these locations and it is even possible that the term Wogastisburg referred only to a kind of temporary encampment rather than a permanent settlement, in which case establishing a definite location would be impossible.
