= Peter Nigri =

Czech Dominican theologian and preacher

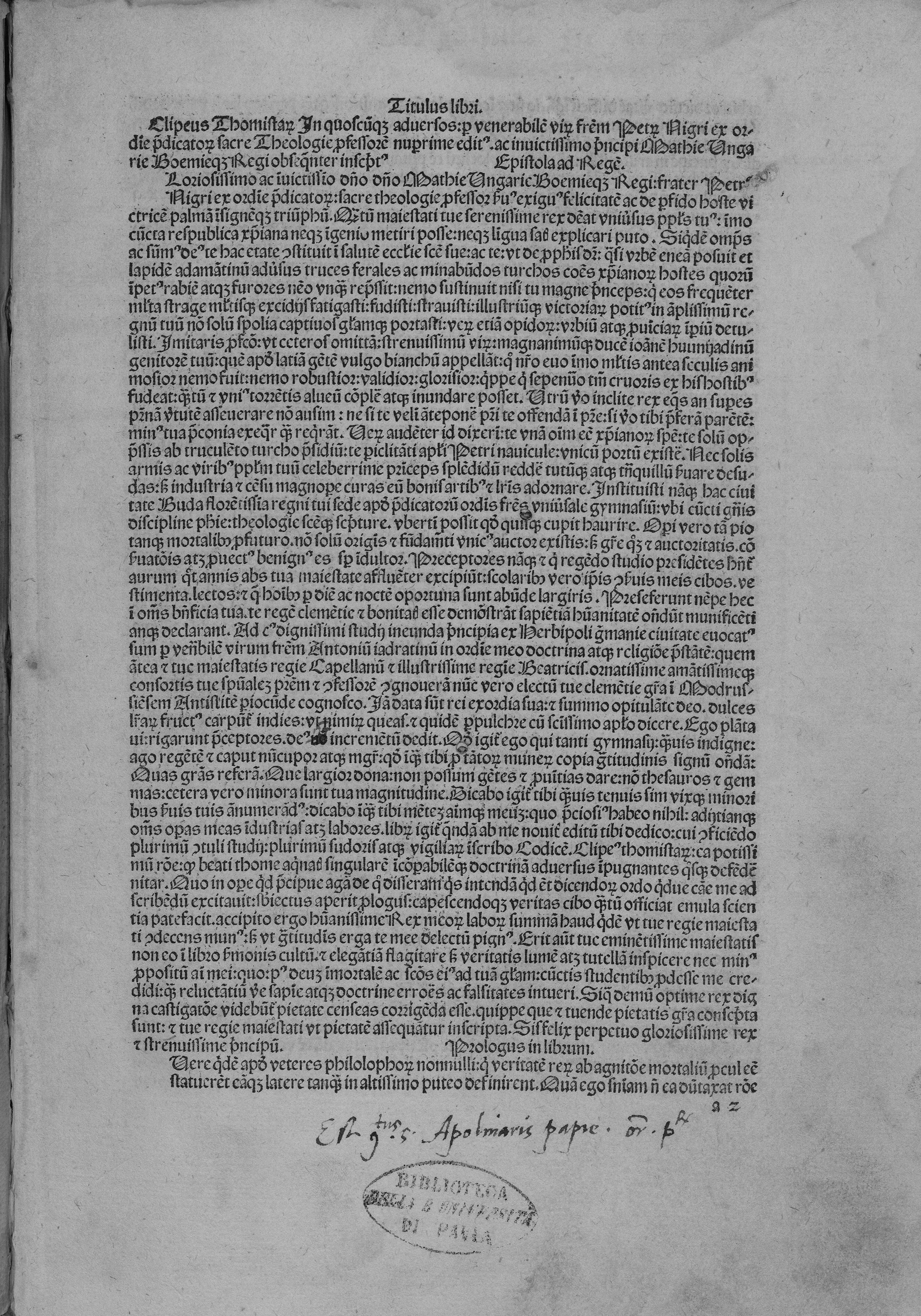
Schwartz, Clipeus thomistarum

Peter Nigri (Latinized from Schwartz), known also as Peter George Niger (1434 at Kaaden in Bohemia – between 1481 and 1484), was a Dominican theologian, preacher and controversialist.

== Life ==
He studied at different universities (Salamanca, Montpellier, Bologna, etc.) and entered the Dominican Order in 1452 at Eichstätt, Bavaria. After his religious profession he took up philosophy and theology at Leipzig, where he also produced his first literary work De modo praedicandi (1457). In 1459 he defended publicly in Freiburg a series of theses so successfully that the provincial chapter then in session there sent him to the University of Bologna for advanced courses in theology and canon law.

Recalled after two years, he was made lector of theology and engaged in teaching and preaching. In 1465 he taught philosophy and was regent of studies in Cologne; in 1467 taught theology at Ulm; in 1469 or 1470 was elected prior in Eichstätt, on 31 May 1473, the newly founded University of Ingolstadt conferred on him the degree of Doctor of Theology; in 1474 he taught theology in the convent at Ratisbon and in 1478 became professor of Old Testament exegesis in the University of Ingolstadt.

Shortly after, on the invitation of the patron of learning, Matthias Corvinus, King of Hungary, he became rector of his newly erected Academy of Philosophy, Theology, and Sacred Scripture at Buda, in gratitude for which Nigri dedicated to the king his Clypeus Thomistarum adversus omnes doctrinae doctoris angelici obtrectatores (Venice, 1481), in which he defends the teaching of Thomas Aquinas against the Scotists and Nominalists.

== Works ==
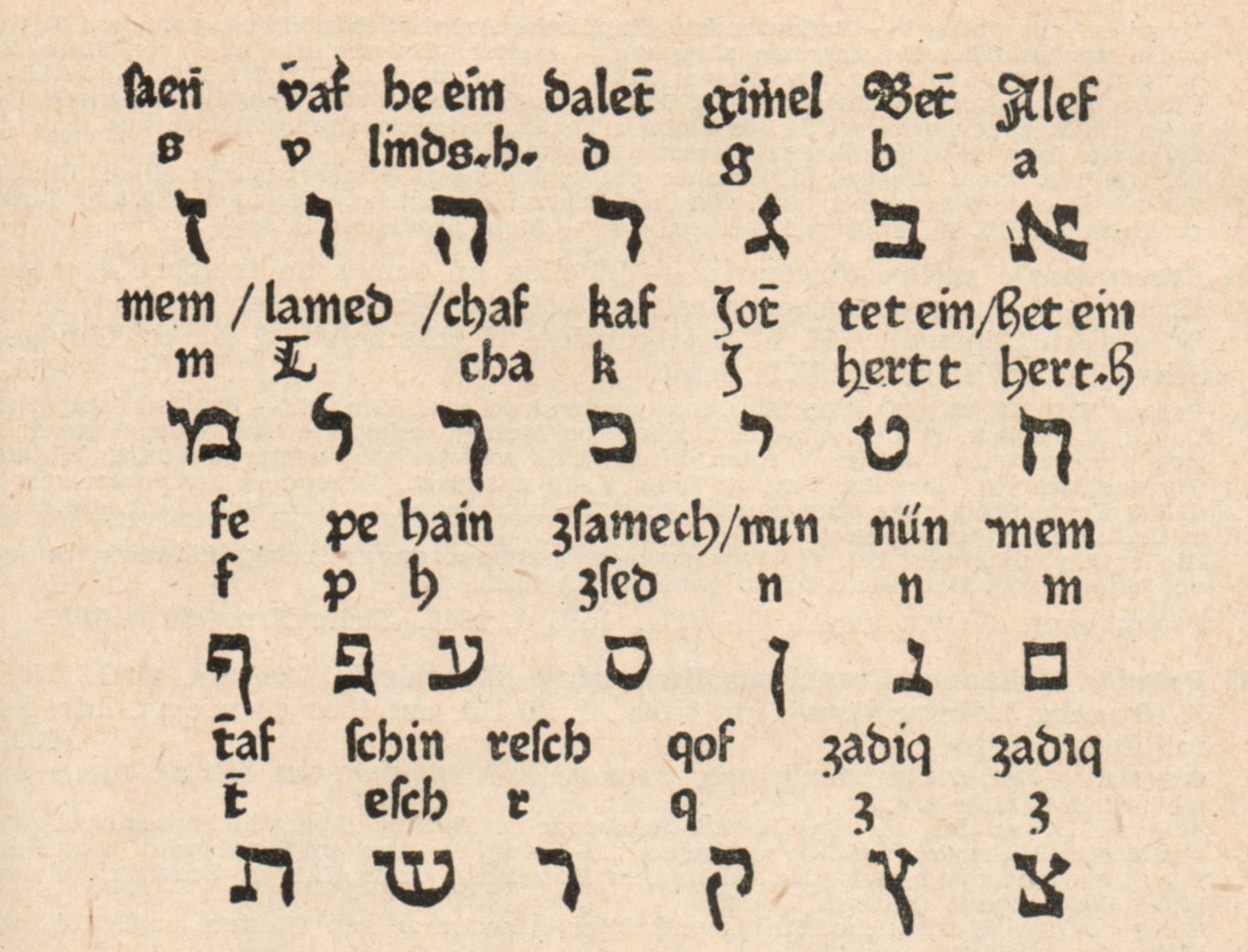
Hebrew alphabet. From Peter Niger's Stern des Meschiah, 1477, 1646

Niger was an eminent theologian and preacher, and an orthodox disciple of Aquinas. In his theological works he mainly limits himself to the discussion of questions of logic and psychology.

He devoted most of his time to preaching to the Jews. He had learned their language and become familiar with their literature at Salamanca and Montpellier by associating with Jewish children and attending the lectures of the rabbis. At Ratisbon, Worms, and Frankfort-on-the-Main he preached in German, Latin, and Hebrew, frequently challenging the rabbis to a disputation.

He wrote two anti-Semitic works, one in Latin, Tractatus contra Perfidos Judaeos (Esslingen, 1475), in which he severely attacked the Jews and the Talmud. The other, written in German, is entitled Stern des Messias (star of the Messiah)(Esslingen, 1477). Reuchlin in his Augenspiegel declared them absurd.

Both works have appendices giving the Hebrew alphabet in Hebrew and Latin type, rules of grammar and for reading Hebrew, the Decalogue in Hebrew, and some Messianic texts from the Old Testament. They are among the earliest specimens of Hebrew printing in Germany, and the first attempt at Hebrew grammar in that country by a Christian scholar. They were later published separately as Commentatio de primis linguae Hebraicae elementis (Altdorf, 1764).

Peter Teuto, O. P. (Quétif, I, 855) and Peter Eystettensis (Eck, "Chrysopassus Cent.", XLIX) are most probably to be identified with this Peter Nigri.
