= Wenceslas Pantaleon Kirwitzer =

Bohemian Jesuit missionary and astronomer in China (1588 – 1626)

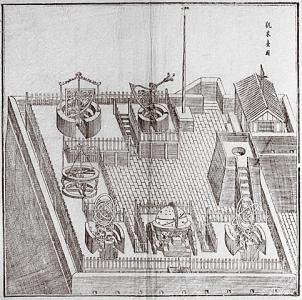
Imperial Observatory in Beijing

Wenceslas Pantaleon Kirwitzer (1588, in Kadaň – 1626, in Macau) was an astronomer and a Jesuit missionary. His name in China was Qi Weicai (祁維材).

== Life ==
Kirwitzer was born in Kadaň (Germ. Kaaden), Bohemia (present-day Czech Republic) to a protestant family descended from the village of Krbice (Germ. Kürbitz) so his surname was derived from "Kürbitzer". He converted to Catholicism as a youth and started studying Jesuit Academy in Olomouc (after Charles University in Prague the second oldest university in the Czech lands established by Bishop Vilém Prusinovský z Víckova). He attracted attention of his professors for his talent especially for natural science. In 1606 he became a novice at Jesuits in Brno. After a short time he was called up to Rome to be embodied in the Collegium Romanum. He was a member of this College in the time when Galileo Galilei was in Rome (1611) to state his case in the question of Heliocentric and Ptolemaic systems. The Roman College was then open to the Copernican opinion held by Galileo. After a short career as a Professor of Mathematics in Graz and later in Coimbra, Portugal Kirwitzer left with other brothers (among them Nicolas Trigault) for China as a missionary. Their ship San Carlos or Bom Jesus arrived in Goa, India, in October 1618. Only 8 brothers out of 22 survived the journey, among them Johann Adam Schall von Bell aus Köln and Johann Schreck. After some time in Goa he moved on to China and finally to Macau where he died on May 22, 1626 (other sources consider Kyoto /then called Meaco/ as the place of his death). He didn't stop being interested in astronomy, he kept in touch with Johann Adam Schall von Bell, a German Jesuit that was preparing the reform of the Chinese calendar and later became president of the Astronomical Office in Beijing. His observations of comets were published in Observationes cometarum anni 1618 factæ in India Orientali a quibusdam S. J. mathematicis in Sinense regnum navigantibus in Aschaffenburg in 1620. Other works include Literae de Martyrio p. Joannis Bapt. Machadi soc. Jesu, qui anno 1617 in Japonia passus est (1622) and Annuae litterae e Sinis datae Macao 28. Nov. et 27. Oct. 1625.

== Heliocentric opinion ==
The exact opinions of Wenceslas Pantaleon Kirwitzer on the topic of heliocentric system are dubious. He never wrote about it in China. He was considered Copernican by his contemporaries, though. For further reading on this topic: Copernicus in China

== Kirwitzer Day ==
In honour of W.P. Kirwitzer there are annual Kirwitzer Days organized in Kadaň, the astronomer's birthplace. The event is dedicated to the dialogue between natural sciences and theological and philosophical systems.

== See also ==
- Manuel Dias Jr.
- St. Paul's College, Macao
- List of Jesuit scientists
- List of Roman Catholic scientist-clerics
