= Manuel Dias the Younger =

Portuguese Jesuit missionary in China (1574 – 1659)

Manuel Dias
- Born: 1574; Castelo Branco, Kingdom of Portugal
- Died: 4 March 1659 (aged 84–85); China
- Occupation: Jesuit missionary
- Known for: Introduction of the telescope in China

Manuel Dias the Younger (1574 – 4 March 1659) was a Portuguese Jesuit missionary.

== Name ==
Manuel Dias the Younger (Latin: Junior) acquired his epithet to distinguish him from Manuel Dias the Elder (c. 1561–1639). He is also known as Emanuel or Emmanuel Diaz. His name was sinified as Yang Manuo (陽瑪諾), and he was also referred to by his courtesy name Yanxi (演西).

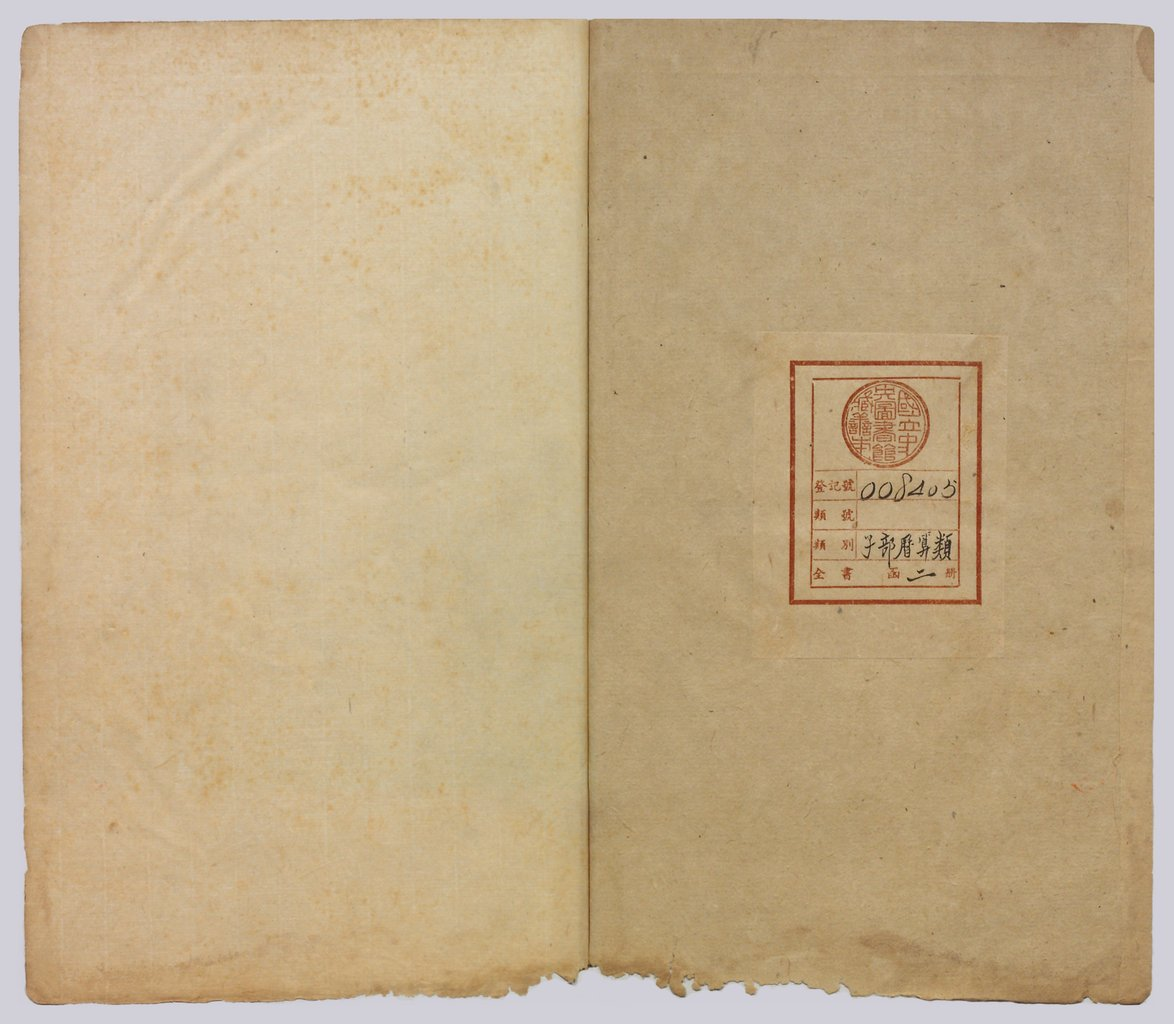
Summary of Astronomy, first edition

== Life ==
Dias arrived in China in 1610, reaching Beijing in 1613. He introduced the telescope into China just a few years after it had been developed in the Netherlands (1608). The telescope was first mentioned in his Tian Wen Lüe (Explicatio Sphaerae Coelestis in Latin or Summary of Astronomy in English) in 1615. In the Tian Wen Lüe he presented the latest European astronomical knowledge in the form of questions and answers. The book was studied and published until the 19th century.

== See also ==
- Wenceslas Pantaleon Kirwitzer
