= Karel Havlíček (artist) =

Czech painter (1907–1988)

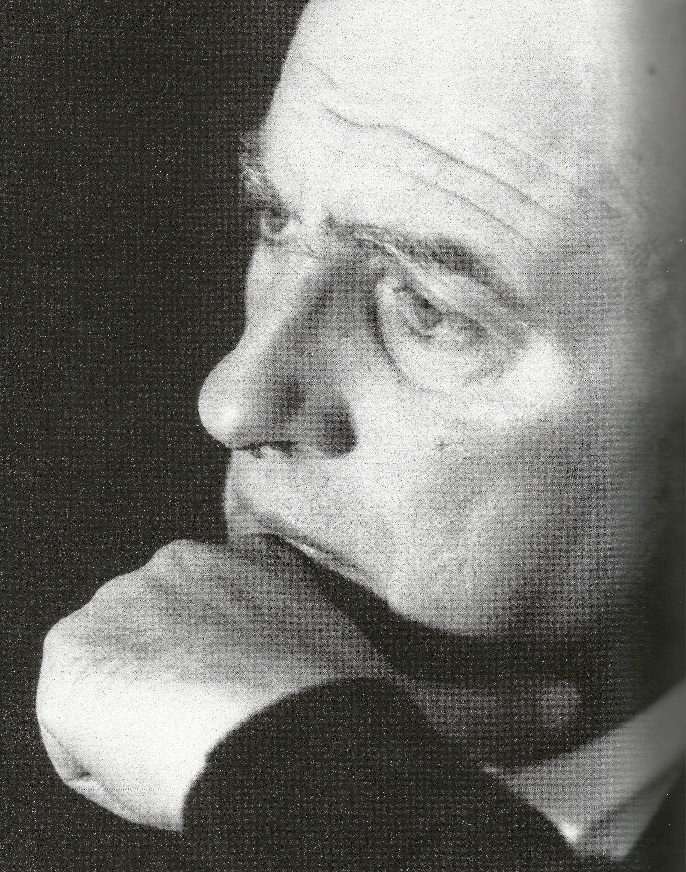
Karel Havlíček

Karel Havlíček (31 October 1907 – 25 December 1988) was a Czech painter and designer.

== Biography ==
He was born on 31 October 1907 in Berlin where his parents had moved from Vienna in 1903 because his father Karel started to work in the state theatres as a scene designer. They moved to Czechoslovakia in 1923 and his father entered the National Theatre in Prague as a stage setter. Karel Havlíček junior studied in Berlin and Prague gymnasiums and influenced by his father and his friends (Cesar Klein, Pankok, Emil Pirchan, and Aravantinos) he was interested in art. However his father persuaded him to study law at Charles University and after graduation he started a career of an official. In 1946, he moved to Kadaň and started to work in the Thun porcelain factory in Klášterec nad Ohří. Since 1955 he changed various hard manual jobs. He found fulfillment in visiting natural museums, reading his favourite Kant and Schopenhauer and especially in drawing. He drew a picture every day for tens of years. The communist regime did not allow to display his work and so he was recognized only by a few artists and writers, e.g. Karel Teige, Vratislav Effenberger or Ivo Pondělíček. Several exhibitions took place in Germany and Austria thanks to his friend Gotthard Schwinge. He died on 25 December 1988 in Kadaň. The municipal gallery in Kadaň is named after him.
