= Gymnasium Kadaň =

Coordinates: 50.3802894°N 13.2721725°E

- Gymnasium Caadanense
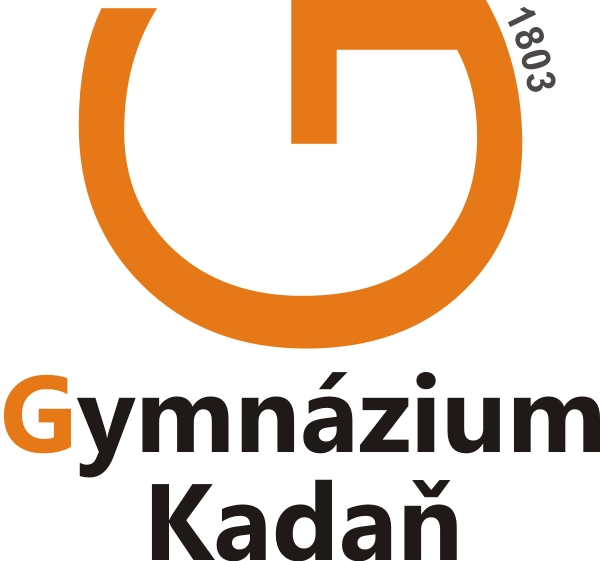

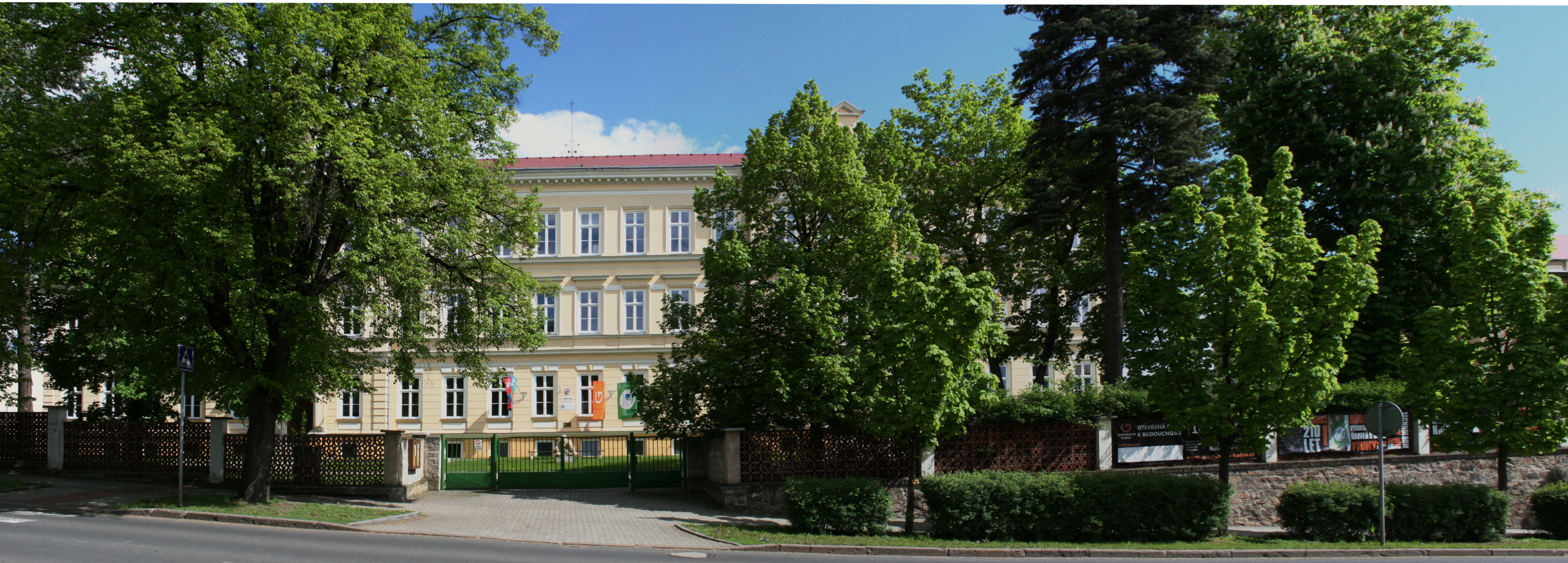
- Kadaň, Ústí nad Labem Region, 43201; Czech Republic

Information
- School type: Gymnasium
- Motto: Consultum bene iuventae est (Youth in good hands)
- Established: 1803
- Status: open
- Headmaster: Mgr. Tomáš Oršulák, Ph.D.
- Teaching staff: 36 (2022/23)
- Enrollment: 361 (2022/23)
- Classes: 14
- Language: Czech
- Website: Official website

Gymnasium Kadaň (Czech: Gymnázium Kadaň) is a Czech regional gymnasium in the Ústí nad Labem Region of Kadaň. It is the oldest school in Kadaň and fifth oldest in Ústí nad Labem Region. The school was established in 1803 with 99 students and continued under the control of the Piarists until 1823. The institute of Gymnasium was then reestablished in 1872 in a new building. The Gymnasium was again closed in 1951 by communist education reform. A new Gymnasium was established in 1958.

== Notable alumni and teacher ==
- Howorka Franciscus Wenzel – (1851–1913) educator, naturalist, author fishery textbook
- P. Virgil Grimmich – (1861–1903) philosopher, theologian, professor at the University of Vienna and Prague
- Karl Wilhelm Gawalowski – (1861–1945) writer, librarian
- Karl Prodinger – (1875–1948) educator
- Carl Furtmüller – (1880–1951) educator,
- Victor Hadwiger – (1878–1911) poet, writer
- Josef Heinrich – (1879–1943) forest engineer and writer
- Petr Hlaváček – (1974) historian
- Theodor Innitzer – (1875–1955) Archbishop of Vienna and a cardinal
- Alfred Kleinberg – (1881–1939) professor
- Miroslava Kopicová – (1951) Czech politician
- Vojtěch Kraus – (1944) professor and painter
- Josef von Löschner – (1809–1888) pioneer of modern European balneologie
- Johann Nepomuk Oettl – (1801–1866) founder of Czech modern beekeeping
- Robert Anton Pöpl – (1812–1866) Franciscan priest, father of orphans
- Josef Chaim Sagher – (1875–1946) Zionist, last Rabbi's Kadaň
- Walter Serner – (1889–1942) writer, essayist and co-qfounder of dada
- Heribert Sturm – (1879–1981) historian, archivist
- Hugo Karl Tippmann – (1875–1942) American poet and journalist
