= Burgstein =

- Ortsteil of Weischlitz
- Coat of arms
- Interactive map of Burgstein
- Location within Germany Location within Saxony
- Coordinates: 50°25′N 12°1′E
- Country: Germany
- State: Saxony
- District: Vogtlandkreis
- Municipality: Weischlitz

Area
  - Total: 57.90 km^{2} (22.36 sq mi)
- Elevation: 549 m (1,801 ft)

Population (2009-12-31)
  - Total: 1,954
  - Density: 33.75/km^{2} (87.41/sq mi)
- Time zone: UTC+01:00 (CET)
  - Summer (DST): UTC+02:00 (CEST)
- Postal codes: 08538
- Dialling codes: 037433
- Vehicle registration: V
- Website: www.burgstein.de

Burgstein is a village and a former municipality in the Vogtlandkreis district, in Saxony, Germany. Since 1 January 2011, it is part of the municipality Weischlitz.
