= Reuth, Saxony =

Reuth
- Ortsteil of Weischlitz
- Interactive map of Reuth
- Location within Germany Location within Saxony
- Coordinates: 50°28′N 11°58′E
- Country: Germany
- State: Saxony
- District: Vogtlandkreis
- Municipality: Weischlitz

Area
  - Total: 30.66 km^{2} (11.84 sq mi)
- Elevation: 600 m (2,000 ft)

Population (2015-12-31)
  - Total: 985
  - Density: 32.1/km^{2} (83.2/sq mi)
- Time zone: UTC+01:00 (CET)
  - Summer (DST): UTC+02:00 (CEST)
- Postal codes: 08538
- Dialling codes: 037435
- Vehicle registration: V
- Website: www.reuth-vogtland.de

Reuth (German pronunciation: [ˈʁɔʏt]) is a village and a former municipality in the Vogtlandkreis district, in Saxony, Germany. Since 1 January 2017, it is part of the municipality Weischlitz.
