= Úhošť =

- IUCN category IV (habitat/species management area)
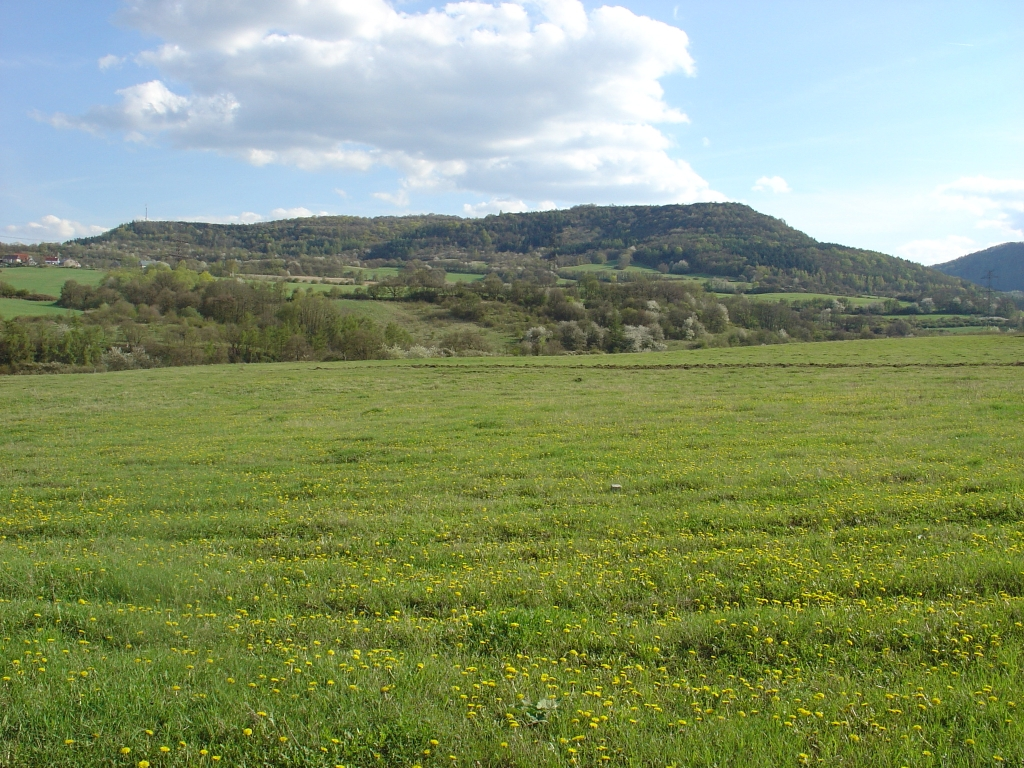
- Úhošť from the north

- Location within Czech Republic
- Location: Ústí nad Labem Region, Czech Republic
- Nearest town: Kadaň
- Coordinates: 50°21′32″N 13°14′18″E
- Area: 344.912 ha (852.30 acres)
- Max. elevation: 593 m (1,946 ft)
- Min. elevation: 320 m (1,050 ft)
- Established: 17 July 1974
- Operator: AOPK ČR

Úhošť (German: Burberg) is a hill and a national nature reserve in the Ústí nad Labem Region of the Czech Republic. It lies in the Doupov Mountains. The hill reaches the elevation of 593 metres (1,946 ft). It is also a place where might have occurred the Battle of Wogastisburg in 631 AD.

== Geography ==
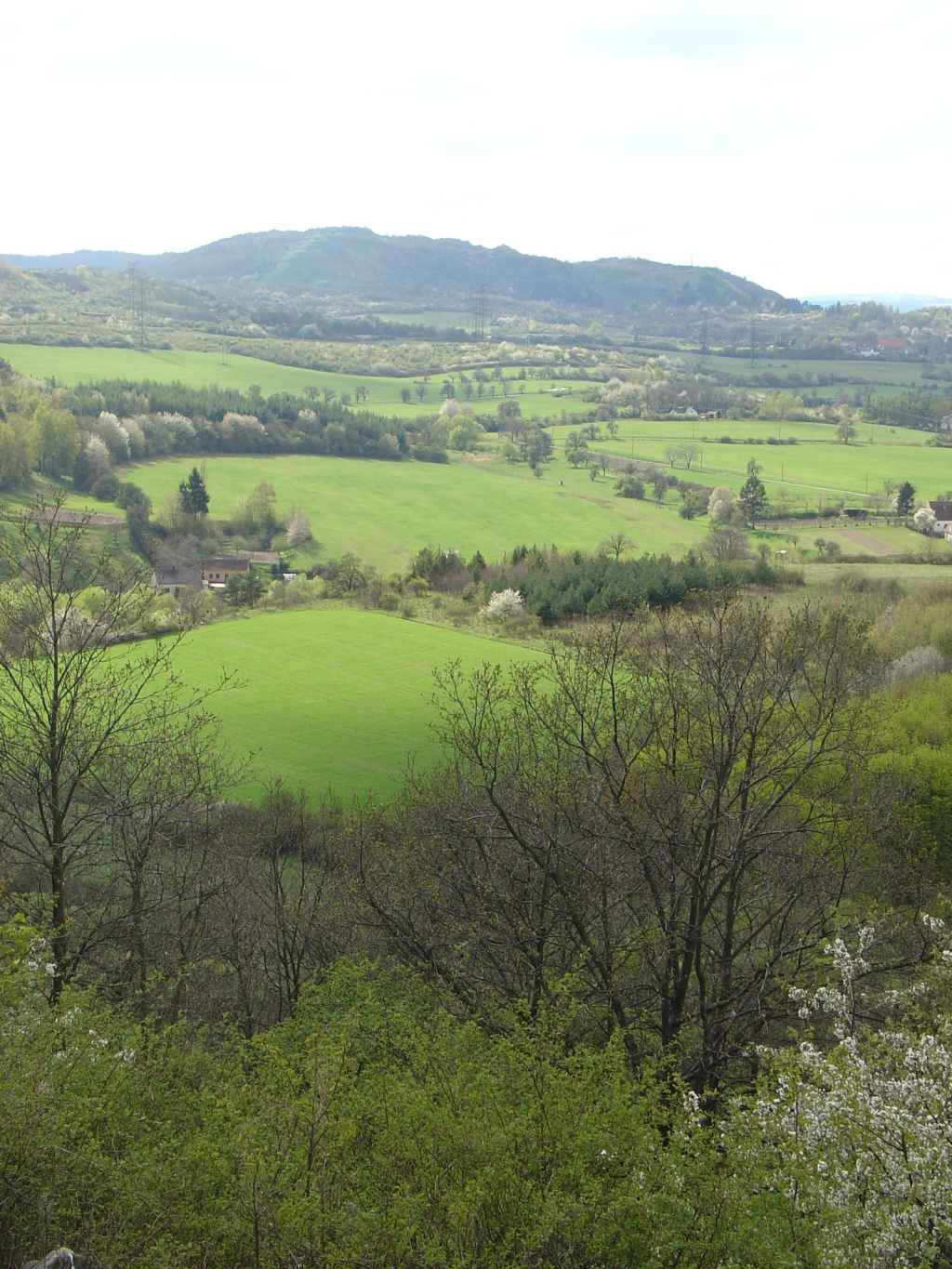
Úhošť from the east

Úhošť is located in the Doupov Mountains in the municipal territory of Kadaň, between the villages Brodce and Pokutice (parts of Kadaň). The hill is a mesa with an area of 114.5 ha (283 acres); the plateau at the top has an area of 80.5 ha (199 acres). It has been protected as a national nature reserve since 1974. The national nature reserve has an area of 344.9 ha (852 acres) and a negligible area of the reserve lies also in the territory of Klášterec nad Ohří.

== Nature ==
The hill arose in connection with the volcanic activity thad created all the Doupov Mountains. It is thus mainly formed by basalt.

In terms of plants, the area is very diverse. There are 1,000 plant species out of 3,000 recorded in the Czech Republic in the nature reserve. The slopes are covered with natural forest and steppe phytocoenose with such plants as hepaticas, orchis, pasqueflowers and others.

There is also a rich bird colony (owls, bee-eaters etc.).

== Settlement ==
There used to be a village Úhošť on the top of the hill. It probably existed in Prehistory and some cultures from the Bronze Age (Knovíz culture) have been approved by excavations. The first written record of the village comes from 1401 when it was sold to a Kadaň townsman. It changed the holders coming usually from the nearby noble families. It remained in the property of the Thun family since the confiscations after the Battle of White Mountain till 1850 when it became an independent municipality and had a steady population of about 50 people. The population started to decline after World War II, and the village was officially dissolved in 1963. Nowadays there are just scrubby ruins of several houses.

== Tourism ==
There is an educational trail leading through the nature reserve.
