= Burgstein (Dollnstein) =

Mountain in Germany

Coordinates: 48°56′N 12°54′E

Geography
- Location: Bavaria, Germany

Burgstein (Dollnstein) is a rock formation in Bavaria, Germany.
