= Kürbitz =

- Ortsteil of Weischlitz
- Interactive map of Kürbitz
- Location within Germany Location within Saxony
- Coordinates: 50°27′41″N 12°4′31″E
- Country: Germany
- State: Saxony
- District: Vogtlandkreis
- Municipality: Weischlitz

Area
  - Total: 6.93 km^{2} (2.68 sq mi)
- Elevation: 358 m (1,175 ft)

Population (2011)
  - Total: 600
  - Density: 87/km^{2} (220/sq mi)
- Time zone: UTC+01:00 (CET)
  - Summer (DST): UTC+02:00 (CEST)
- Postal codes: 08538
- Dialling codes: 037436
- Vehicle registration: V
- Website: www.kuerbitz-vogtland.de

Kürbitz is a former municipality in the district of Vogtlandkreis in Saxony in Germany located near Plauen. On 1 January 1999, the village was merged into the municipality Weischlitz.

== History ==
The first documentary mention of Kürbitz dates from 1225.

== See also ==
- Rittergut Kürbitz
