= Jan Hasištejnský of Lobkowicz =

Czech traveller, humanist, politician, writer and nobleman

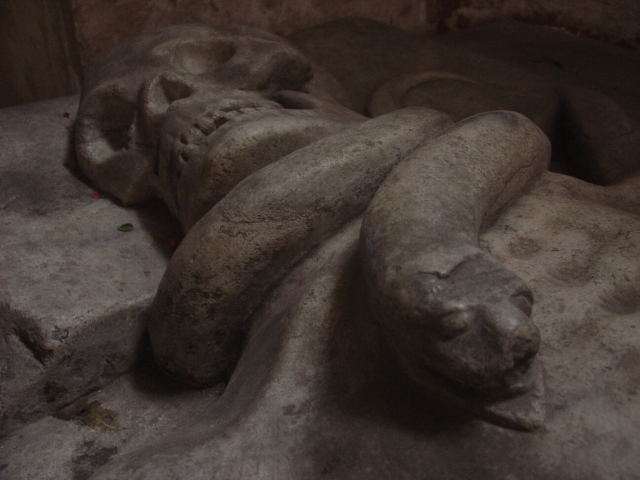
Tomb of Jan Hasištejnský by Ulrich Creutz (detail) in the Franciscan Monastery in Kadaň

Jan Hasištejnský of Lobkowicz (Czech: Jan Hasištejnský z Lobkovic, Czech pronunciation: [ˈjan ˈɦasɪʃtɛjnskiː ˈzlopkovɪts]; 1450–1517) was a Bohemian diplomat of the House of Lobkowicz.

In 1482 he became a Doctor of Canon Law. He undertook diplomatic missions to Luxembourg (in 1477) and Rome (in 1487) in the time of King Vladislaus II. The king sent him to negotiate a marriage with Mary of Burgundy, which was ultimately unsuccessful. He made a journey to Palestine in 1493 and wrote a travel book about it, titled Pilgrimage to the Holy Grave in Jerusalem (first published in 1505). He also edited Advice and Precept to the Son Jaroslav, What to Do and What to Beware. He founded the Franciscan monastery in Kadaň. He died on or around 28 January 1517 and was buried in the monastery. He was the elder brother of the so-called "Czech Ulysses" Bohuslav Hasištejnský z Lobkovic.
