= Burgstein (Thuringia) =

Coordinates: 50°40′37″N 10°57′15″E

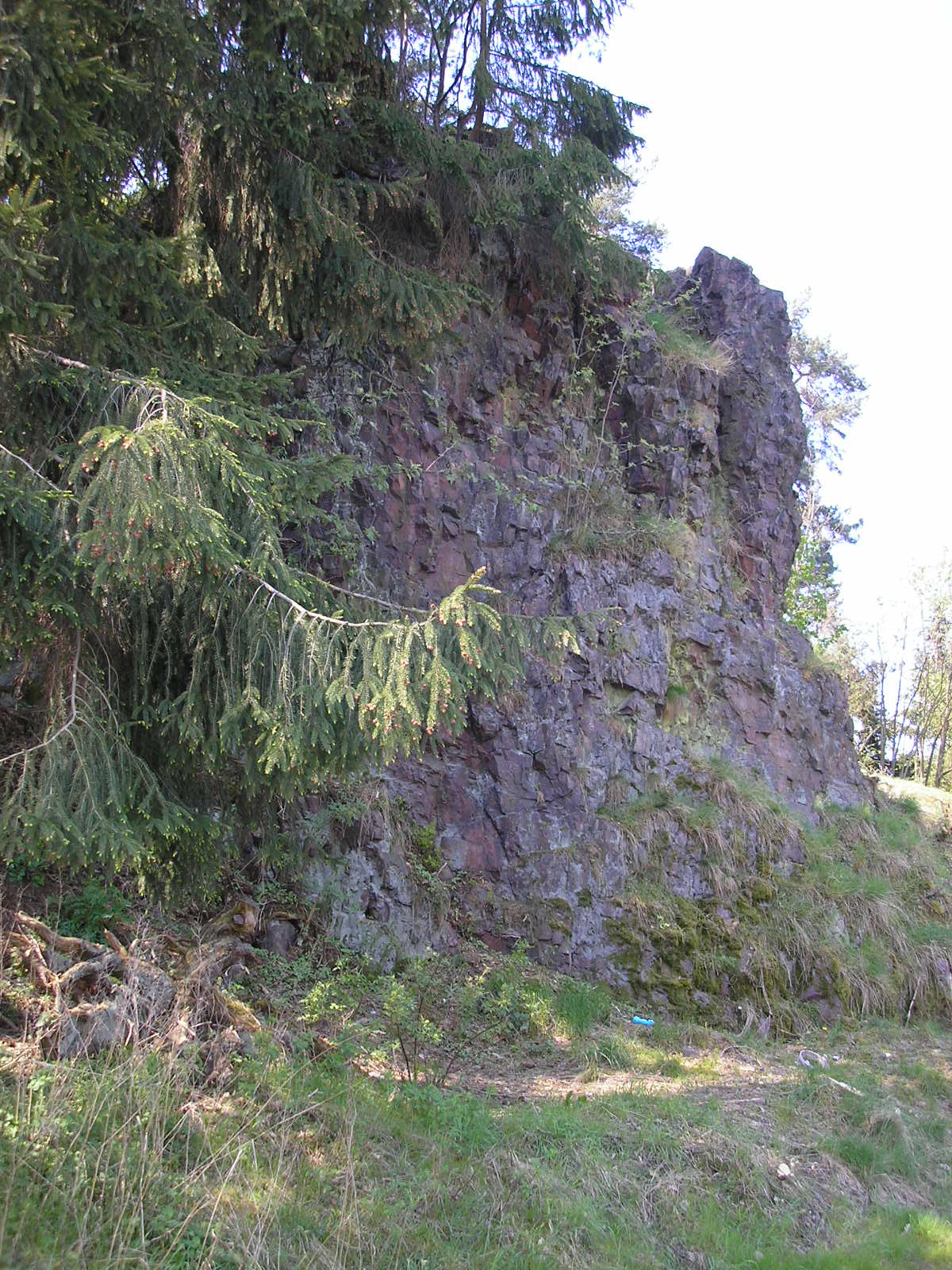
The Burgstein

The Burgstein is a rock formation, about 10 metres (33 ft) high, in the valley of the Ilm in Langewiesen in the central German state of Thuringia. It is made from quartz porphyry and has been a geological natural monument since 1939, the same year a nearby allotment garden association was founded and named after the rock.

It was formed when the Ilm carved out its valley and washed away the surrounding rock. When the Ilmenau–Großbreitenbach railway was built in 1881 it was exposed again because rock at its foot was removed in order to lay the railway track. The rock dates to the Pennsylvanian sub-period and belongs to the Möhrenbach Formation.

The origin of its name is not clear (Burgstein literally means "castle rock"). In Langewiesen, the road of Burgstein is named after the rock. The municipality of Langewiesen mentions it as a landmark for cross-country skiing.
