= Weischlitz =

- Municipality
- Coat of arms

- Location of Weischlitz within Vogtlandkreis district
- Interactive map of Weischlitz
- Location within Germany Location within Saxony
- Coordinates: 50°26′50″N 12°3′35″E
- Country: Germany
- State: Saxony
- District: Vogtlandkreis

Government
  - Mayor (2023–30): Steffen Raab

Area
  - Total: 121.63 km^{2} (46.96 sq mi)
- Elevation: 400 m (1,300 ft)

Population (2025-12-31)
  - Total: 5,551
  - Density: 45.64/km^{2} (118.2/sq mi)
- Time zone: UTC+01:00 (CET)
  - Summer (DST): UTC+02:00 (CEST)
- Postal codes: 08538
- Dialling codes: 037436
- Vehicle registration: V, AE, OVL, PL, RC
- Website: www.weischlitz.de

Weischlitz is a municipality in the Vogtlandkreis district, in Saxony, Germany. It absorbed the former municipalities Kloschwitz and Kürbitz in 1999, Burgstein in 2011, and Reuth in 2017.

Weischlitz station is on the Plauen–Cheb line and the Gera Süd–Weischlitz railway. It is located in the eastern part of the municipality. Gutenfürst station is located in the western part of Weischlitz municipality at Leipzig–Hof railway.

Bundesautobahn 72, a federal motorway between Hof and Chemnitz, crosses the municipality. The Elster viaduct, one of its largest bridges, is located within Weischlitz municipality, close to the village of Pirk.
