= Bílina (river) =

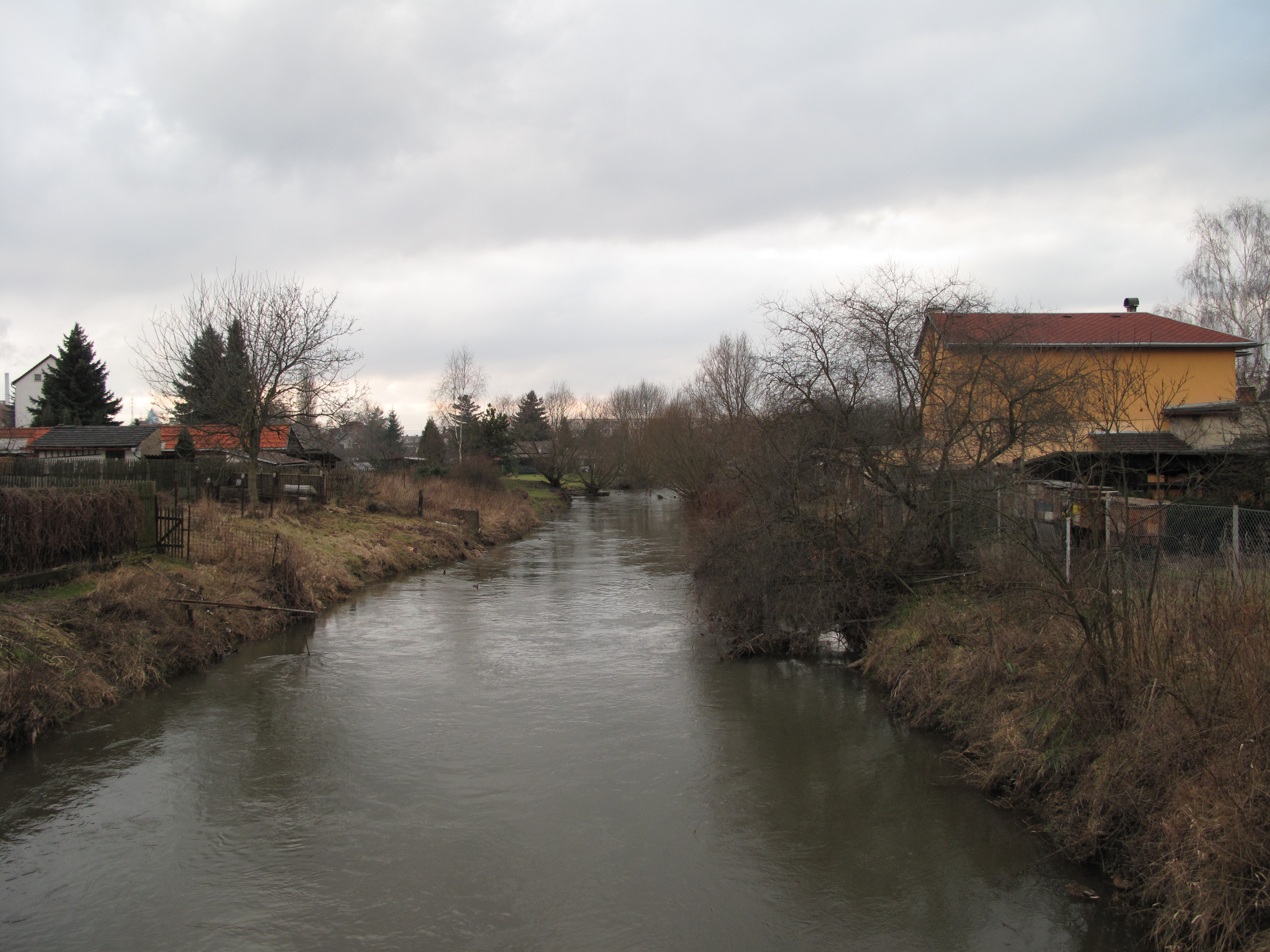
- The Bílina in Hostomice

Location
- Country: Czech Republic
- Region: Ústí nad Labem

Physical characteristics
- Source
  - location: Blatno, Ore Mountains
  - coordinates: 50°32′40″N 13°19′6″E
  - elevation: 823 m (2,700 ft)
- Mouth
  - location: Elbe
  - coordinates: 50°39′28″N 14°2′37″E
  - elevation: 133 m (436 ft)
- Length: 82.0 km (51.0 mi)
- Basin size: 1,082.5 km^{2} (418.0 sq mi)
- Discharge
  - average: 5.9 m^{3}/s (210 cu ft/s) near mouth

Basin features
- Progression: Elbe→ North Sea

The Bílina (Czech pronunciation: [ˈbiːlɪna]; German: Biela) is a river in the Czech Republic, a left tributary of the Elbe River. It flows through the Ústí nad Labem Region. It is 82.0 km (51.0 mi) long. The river flows through a densely populated area with a high concentration of industry. It is infamously known as the dirtiest Czech river, even though water quality has improved significantly in the 21st century.

== Etymology ==
The name of the river is derived from the Czech word bílá (i.e. 'white'). Names of rivers with this colour in the name often referred to the stony or pebbly nature of the river bed.

== Characteristic ==
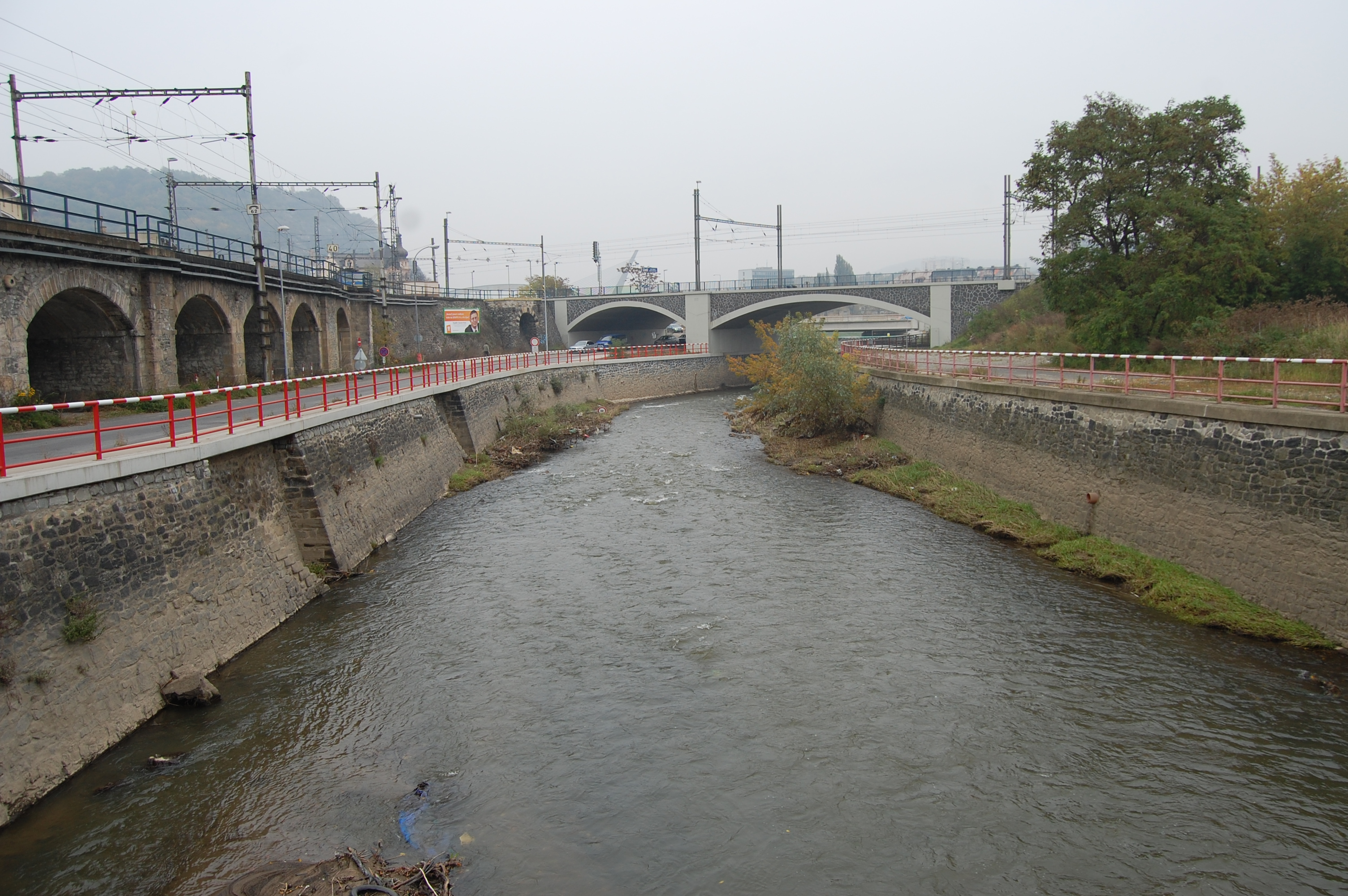
The Bílina in Ústí nad Labem

The Bílina originates in the territory of Blatno in the Ore Mountains at an elevation of 823 m (2,700 ft) and flows to Ústí nad Labem, where it enters the Elbe River at an elevation of 133 m (436 ft). It is 82.0 km (51.0 mi) long. Its drainage basin has an area of 1,082.5 km^{2} (418.0 sq mi).

The longest tributaries of the Bílina are:

Tributary	Length (km)	River km	Side
Srpina	28.2	45.7	left
Bystřice	19.9	20.1	left
Bouřlivec	18.6	30.6	left
Bílý potok	15.8	55.2	left
Ždírnický potok	14.5	2.8	left
Loupnice	13.1	55.9	left
Lužec	13.1	68.1	left
Luční potok	8.8	25.3	right

== Course ==
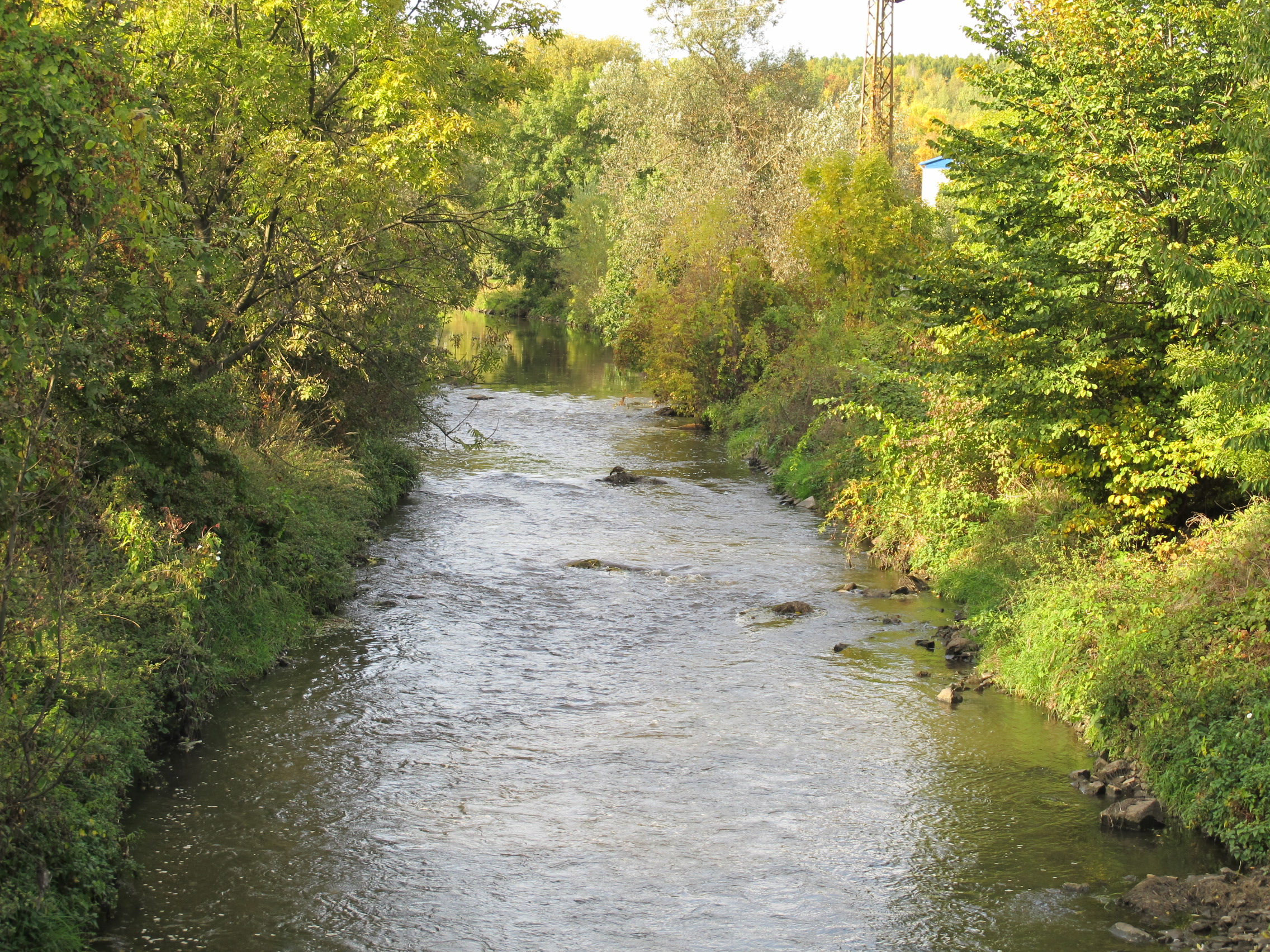
The Bílina in Most-Rudolice

The river flows through the densely populated area of the Most Basin. The most notable settlements on the river are the cities of Ústí nad Labem and Most. The river flows through the municipal territories of Blatno, Boleboř, Jirkov, Vrskmaň, Horní Jiřetín, Litvínov, Most, Obrnice, Želenice, Bílina, Světec, Hostomice, Ohníč, Bžany, Bystřany, Rtyně nad Bílinou, Řehlovice, Trmice and Ústí nad Labem.

== Bodies of water ==
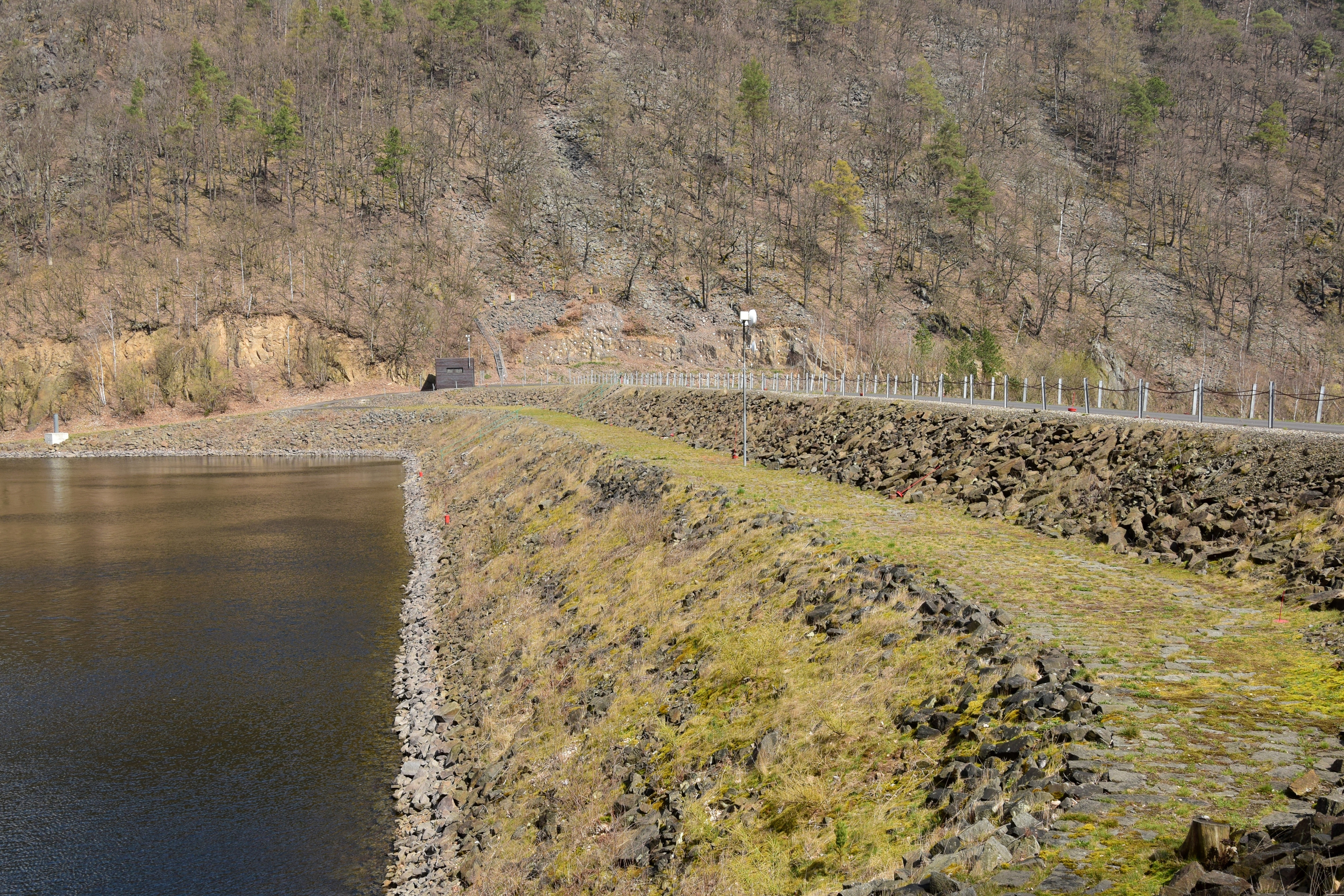
Dam of Jirkov Reservoir

Two reservoirs are built on the upper course of the Bílina. There are 180 bodies of water larger than 1 ha in the basin area. The largest of them is Lake Milada with an area of 252 ha (620 acres).

== Environmental issues ==
The big problem of the river is water pollution. In 2006, it was declared the dirtiest river in the Czech Republic. The river passes through the most industrial area of the country and, in addition to wastewater from industry, it also receives wastewater from surface mining of lignite and from households. Mercury, arsenic, organic substances and other pollutants appeared here. The main problem was the pollution that had accumulated from past decades. Paradoxically, in the upper course of the river, before it reaches the populated area, the water quality is at such a high level that it is suitable even for infants.

Although it has been considered the dirtiest Czech river for decades, the state of pollution improved significantly in the 2010s. The main source of pollution is the chemical factory Orlen Unipetrol in Litvínov. The occurrence of Enterococcus bacteria, indicating the discharge of faeces into the river, is also a problem. Mercury remains present in the sediments.

Coal mining has changed the course of the river, which was partially channeled by a long pipeline in the 1980s. In 2016, a section of the pipeline was replaced by a new riverbed. The rest of the pipeline, which is the Ervěnice Corridor with a length of 4.7 km (2.9 mi), is planned to be replaced in 2025–2027. The plan is to construct meanders and pools, extend the flow path and reduce the slope of the bottom.

== Fauna ==
The improvement of water purity led to the return of fish, and already in 2006 most of the species typical of Czech rivers were found in it, e.g. Eurasian carp, perch and common bream. New fish are introduced into the river twice a year.

== Tourism ==
The Bílina is suitable for river tourism. About 50 km (31 mi) of the river is navigable. There are only few weirs on the river and the lower course is suitable even for less experienced paddlers.

== See also ==
- List of rivers of the Czech Republic
