= Hostomice =

Hostomice may refer to places in the Czech Republic:

- Hostomice (Beroun District), a town in the Central Bohemian Region
- Hostomice (Teplice District), a market town in the Ústí nad Labem Region
