= Emmy Loose =

Austrian opera singer

Emmy Loose (22 January 1914 in Chabařovice – 14 October 1987 in Vienna) was an Austrian operatic soprano particularly associated with soubrette roles.

After vocal studies in Prague Conservatory, she made her stage debut in Hanover as Blonchen in Die Entführung aus dem Serail, in 1939. She first appeared at the Vienna State Opera in 1941, as Annchen in Der Freischütz, and remained with this theatre some 25 years, establishing herself in Mozart soubrette roles (Susanna, Zerlina, Despina).

She made guest appearances at the festivals of Salzburg, Aix-en-Provence, and Glyndebourne, at La Scala in Milan, the Royal Opera House in London, the Liceu in Barcelona, the San Carlo in Naples, the Munich State Opera, etc.

She took part in the creation of Gottfried von Einem's Der Besuch der alten Dame at the Vienna State Opera in 1971. She retired from the stage in 1979, and began teaching at the Vienna Music Academy and at the Sommerakademie in Salzburg.

== Sources ==
- Operissimo.com
