= Vojtěch Preissig =

Czech designer and typographer (1873–1944)

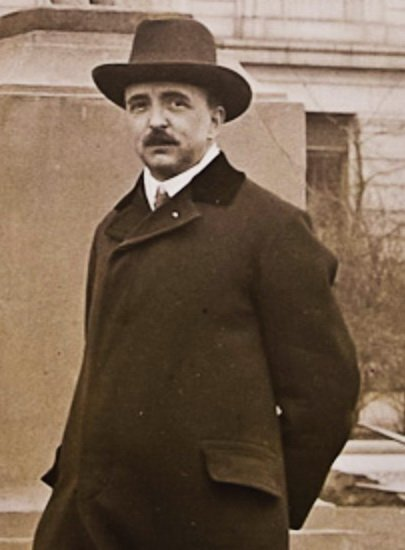
- Preissig in 1931
- Born: 31 July 1873; Světec, Bohemia, Austria-Hungary
- Died: 11 June 1944 (aged 70); Dachau, Nazi Germany
- Known for: Painting
- Children: Irena Bernášková

Vojtěch Preissig (31 July 1873 – 11 June 1944) was a Czech typographer, printmaker, designer, illustrator, painter and teacher. He studied in Prague at the School of Applied Industrial Art (in Friedrich Ohmann's Decorative Architecture workshop) from 1892 to 1896 and at the School of Decorative Architecture from 1897 to 1898.

== Life ==
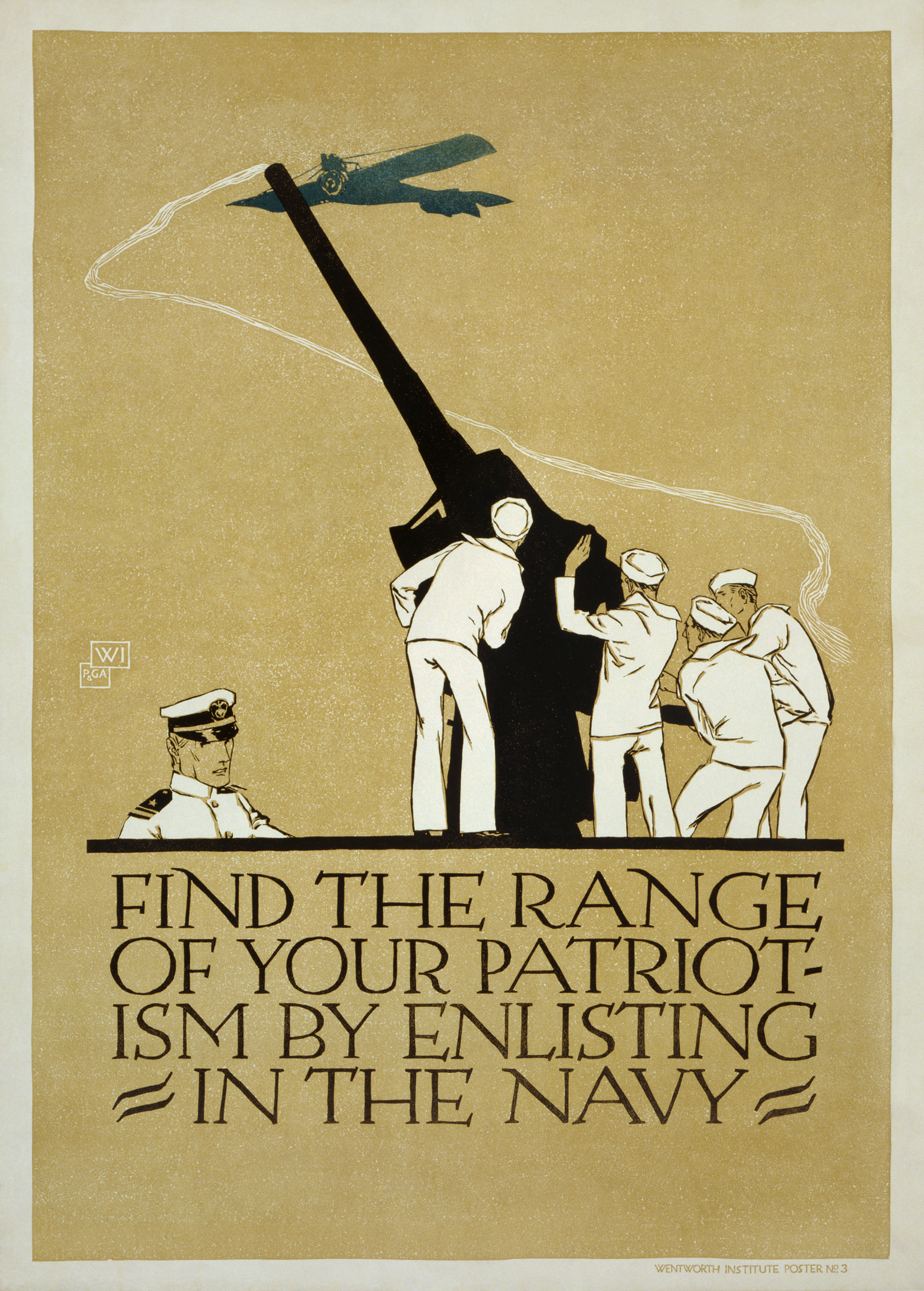
United States Navy recruitment poster by Vojtěch Preissig, 1918 (digitally restored)

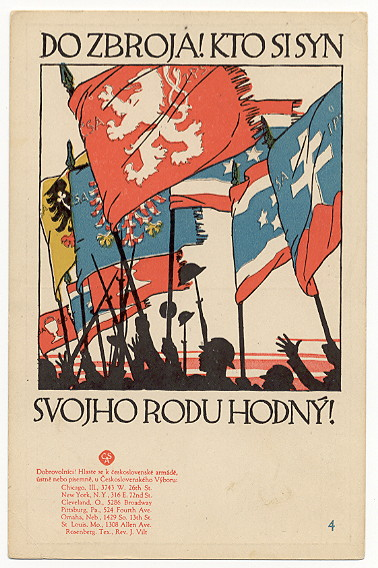
Military postcard, recruitment poster for the Czechoslovak Legion, designed by Preissig (1915)

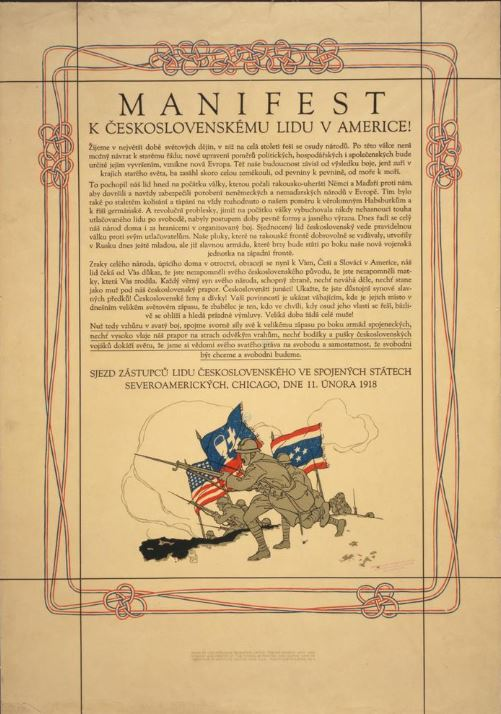
Manifesto to the Czechoslovak people in America (1918), another example of Preissig's recruitment posters for the Czechoslovak Legion

Vojtěch Preissig was born on 31 July 1873 in Světec in Bohemia, Austria-Hungary (now in the Czech Republic). His father was a mining engineer. In 1884 he moved to Prague where he studied at the School of Applied Industrial Art from 1892 to 1896, then at the School of Decorative Architecture from 1897 to 1898. In 1897 he moved to Paris and worked for two years with the Czech Art Nouveau artist, Alphonse Mucha. His early, Secessionist, work was influenced by Japanese art and Symbolism. He returned to Prague in 1903 where he founded the periodical Česká grafika ("Czech Graphics"), published the book Barevný lept a barevná rytina ("Color Etchings and Color Engravings") in 1909 and opened his own graphics studio in 1905. Unfortunately, the graphics studio was not a financial success so he moved to the United States in 1910 and worked as an art instructor. Preissig remained in the United States until 1930. He taught at Columbia University and the Art Students League of New York starting in 1912, then moved to Boston by 1916 and taught a course in graphic arts for the Wentworth Institute. He became the director of the School of Printing and Graphic Arts, until 1926. During his time with the Wentworth Institute he designed recruitment posters for the United States armed forces of World War I, which were principally aimed at Czech immigrants.

=== Membership in Czechoslovak resistance ===
Preissig, along with his daughter Irena Bernášková, supported the Czechoslovak resistance during both World Wars and was arrested in 1940 for doing graphic design work for one of the most important magazines of the resistance, called V boj ("Into Combat"), that had been outlawed by German authorities. He died on 11 June 1944 in Dachau concentration camp.

== Work ==
During World War I he designed recruitment posters for the United States armed forces, which were mainly directed at Czech immigrants. Preissig's work with book design and font design originated from a need for better printing type in Czech. Czech printers had traditionally used German typefaces and added additional diacritical marks as needed.

=== Preissig Antiqua ===
Preissig's work with typefaces began by creating the Preissig Antiqua typeface. Preissig created 'Preissig Antiqua' roughly around the early 20th Century that would influence the style of print and type designs not only in Czechoslovakia, but also all over Europe in general.

== Tributes and awards ==
- The Czech government has commemorated Vojtěch Preissig by issuing stamps that feature his work in 1988, 1994 and 1998.
- In 1992, after Preissig's death, he was awarded the Order of Tomáš Garrigue Masaryk, class II.
- In 2008 the United States embassy in Prague held an exhibit of Preissig's work.
