= Trmice =

- Town
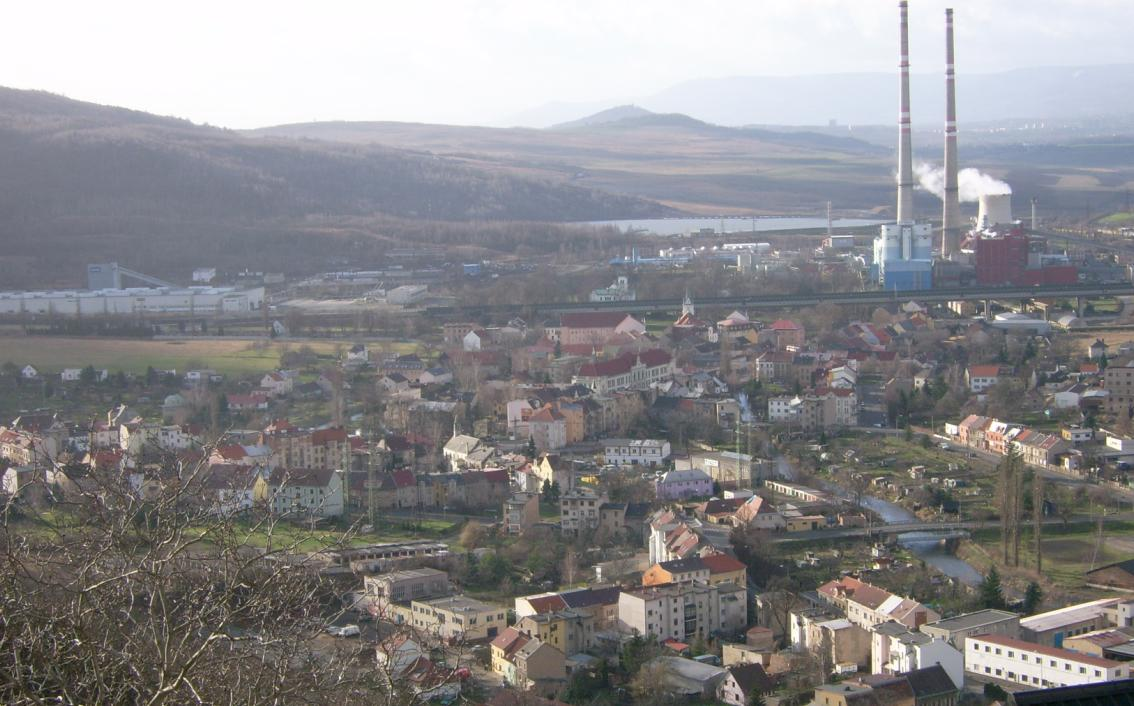
- General view

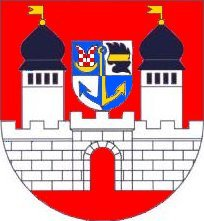
- Flag Coat of arms

- Location in the Czech Republic
- Coordinates: 50°38′36″N 13°59′57″E
- Country: Czech Republic
- Region: Ústí nad Labem
- District: Ústí nad Labem
- First mentioned: 1264

Government
  - Mayor: Jana Oubrechtová

Area
  - Total: 6.66 km^{2} (2.57 sq mi)
- Elevation: 148 m (486 ft)

Population (2026-01-01)
  - Total: 3,372
  - Density: 506/km^{2} (1,310/sq mi)
- Time zone: UTC+1 (CET)
  - Summer (DST): UTC+2 (CEST)
- Postal codes: 400 02, 400 04
- Website: www.mestotrmice.cz

Trmice (Czech pronunciation: [ˈtr̩mɪtsɛ]; German: Türmitz) is a town in Ústí nad Labem District in the Ústí nad Labem Region of the Czech Republic. It has about 3,400 inhabitants. The town is located on the Bílina River, next to the city of Ústí nad Labem.

The most notable feudal owners of Trmice were the Nostitz family, who were responsible for the development of the town in the 17th century. Due to the mining of lignite, which began here in the 18th century, the town acquired an industrial character. The main landmark of the town is the neo-Gothic castle Nový zámek.

== Administrative division ==
Trmice consists of three municipal parts (in brackets population according to the 2021 census):

- Trmice (2,645)
- Koštov (369)
- Újezd (83)

== Etymology ==
The name is derived from the personal name Trma, meaning "the village of Trma's people".

== Geography ==
Trmice is located southwest of Ústí nad Labem, in its immediate vicinity. It lies on the border between the Most Basin and Central Bohemian Uplands. The highest point is the hill Jizerský vrch at 454 m (1,490 ft) above sea level. The Bílina River flows through the town. A small part of Lake Milada extends into the territory of Trmice.

== History ==
The first written mention of Trmice is from 1264. The greatest development of the settlement occurred during the rule of the Nostitz family. As a result of the development, Trmice was promoted to a market town in 1664. There was a Gothic-Renaissance fortress in Trmice, rebuilt into a Baroque castle in 1662 that served as a summer residence of the Nostitz family. This so-called Starý zámek (lit. 'old castle') was repaired in 1926, but it was demolished in 1965 due to considerable dilapidation.

From 1742, lignite was mined in the Trmice area. Between 1950 and 1993, Trmice was a municipal part of Ústí nad Labem. Since 1 January 1994, it has been again a separate municipality. In 1996, Trmice was promoted to a town.

== Demographics ==
Historical population

Year	Pop.	±%
1869	2,212	—
1880	2,892	+30.7%
1890	3,756	+29.9%
1900	5,119	+36.3%
1910	6,659	+30.1%

Year	Pop.	±%
1921	7,969	+19.7%
1930	8,522	+6.9%
1950	5,945	−30.2%
1961	5,982	+0.6%
1970	4,950	−17.3%

Year	Pop.	±%
1980	3,957	−20.1%
1991	1,824	−53.9%
2001	2,691	+47.5%
2011	2,967	+10.3%
2021	3,097	+4.4%

Source: Censuses

== Transport ==
The D8 motorway, which connects Prague with Ústí nad Labem, runs through the town.

Trmice is located on the railway line Ústí nad Labem–Bílina. The town is served by two train stations: Trmice and Koštov.

== Sights ==
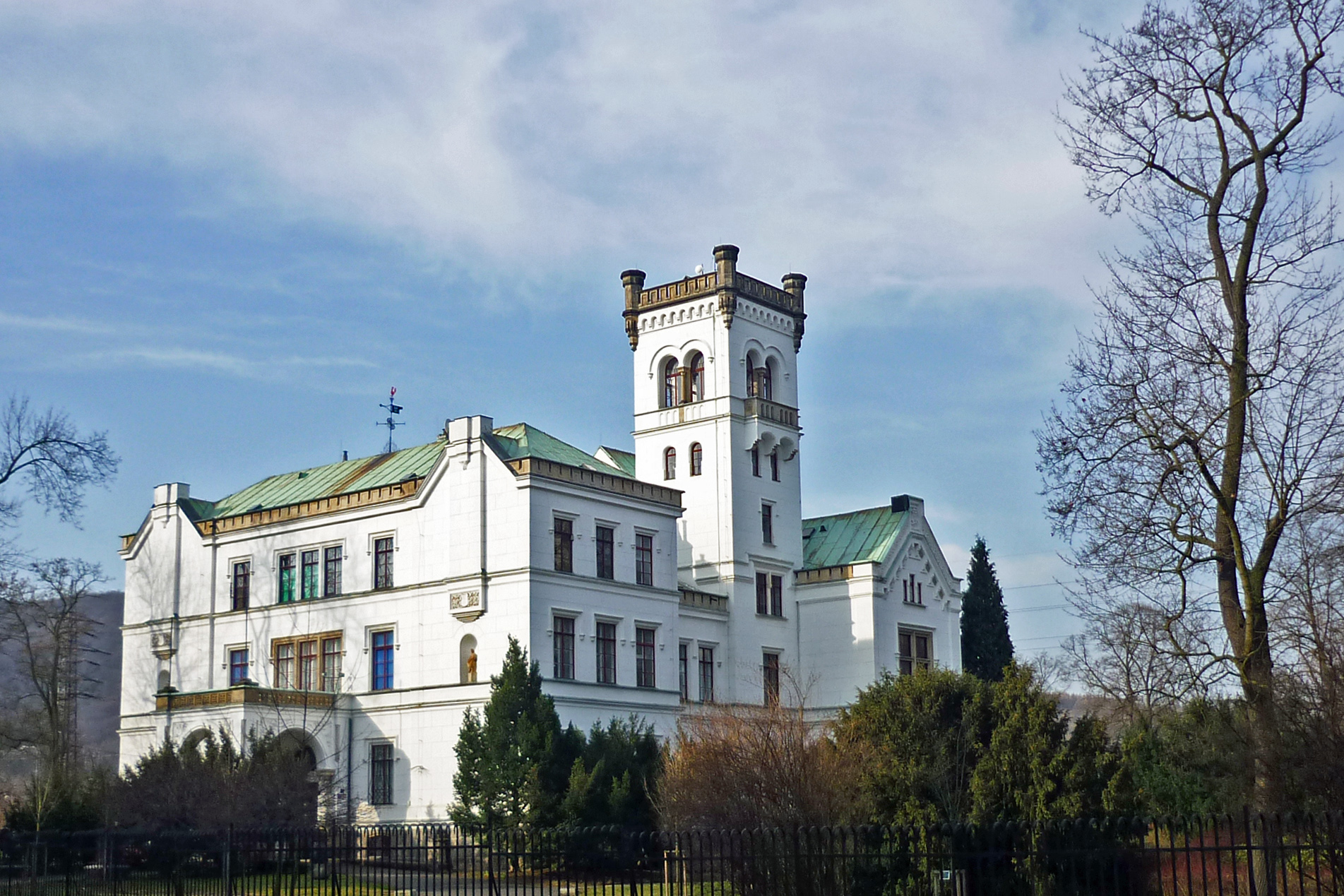
The castle Nový zámek

The castle Nový zámek (lit. 'new castle'), also called Trmice Castle, is among the most important landmarks of the town. It was designed by Heinrich von Ferstel and built in the neo-Gothic style in 1856–1863. Today it serves as a cultural centre. It also houses a museum with permanent exhibitions on the history of mining and industry in the region, and a model railway museum.

The main landmark of the town centre is the Church of the Nativity of the Virgin Mary. It was originally a Baroque church from the 18th century, which replaced a pilgrimage church from 1645. In 1898, it was rebuilt in the Neo-Renaissance style.

The evangelical Church of the Lord the Jesus was built in the neo-Gothic style in 1905–1907. Today the building is owned by the town and is unused.

== Notable people ==
- Hermann Burghart (1834–1901), scenic designer and set decorator
- Oto Neubauer (1931–2026), politician; mayor of Trmice in 1994–2006

== Twin towns – sister cities ==
Trmice is twinned with:

- Königstein, Germany
