= Ehrenfried Patzel =

Czech footballer (1914–2004)

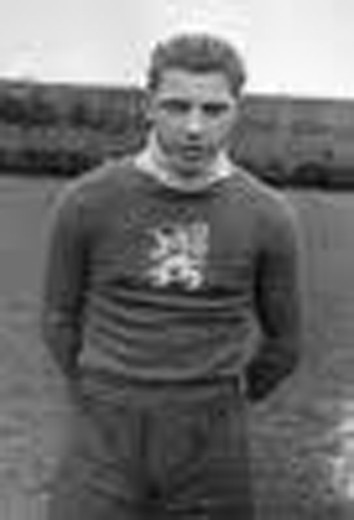

Personal information
- Full name: Ehrenfried Patzel
- Date of birth: 2 December 1914
- Place of birth: Chabařovice, Bohemia, Austria-Hungary
- Date of death: 8 March 2004 (aged 89)
- Place of death: Büdingen, Germany
- Position: Goalkeeper

Senior career*
| Years | Team | Apps | (Gls) |
| 1932–1939 | Teplitzer FK | | |
| 1939–1942 | 1. SV Jena | | |
| 1942–1948 | Offenbacher Kickers | | |

International career
| 1934–1935 | Czechoslovakia | 4 | (0) |
Medal record
Representing Czechoslovakia
Men's Football
FIFA World Cup
| Runner-up | 1934 Italy |
- * Club domestic league appearances and goals

Ehrenfried Patzel (Czech: Čestmír Patzel; 2 December 1914 – 8 March 2004 in Büdingen) was an Ethnic German football player from Czechoslovakia.

Patzel was born in Chabařovice. His mother Františka was Czech, his father Ferdinand was German.

He played for Teplitzer FK from 1932 to 1939. In 1939 Teplitzer team was dissolved by the Nazis and Patzel went to play for 1. SV Jena from 1939 to 1942 and for Offenbacher Kickers from 1942 to 1948.

He also played four matches for the Czechoslovak national team and was a participant at the 1934 FIFA World Cup.
