= Oto Neubauer =

Czech politician (1931–2026)

Member of the Senate of the Czech Republic for Ústí nad Labem
- In office 23 November 1996 – 23 November 1998
- Preceded by: Position established
- Succeeded by: Jaroslav Doubrava

Mayor of Trmice
- In office 1994–2006
- Succeeded by: Jana Oubrechtová

Personal details
- Born: 8 June 1931 Trmice, Czechoslovakia
- Died: 8 June 2026 (aged 95)
- Party: ČSSD
- Occupation: Electrical engineer

Oto Neubauer (8 June 1931 – 8 June 2026) was a Czech politician. A member of the Czech Social Democratic Party, he served in the Senate from 1996 to 1998 and as mayor of Trmice from 1994 to 2006.

Neubauer died on 8 June 2026, his 95th birthday.
