= Chabařovice =

- Town
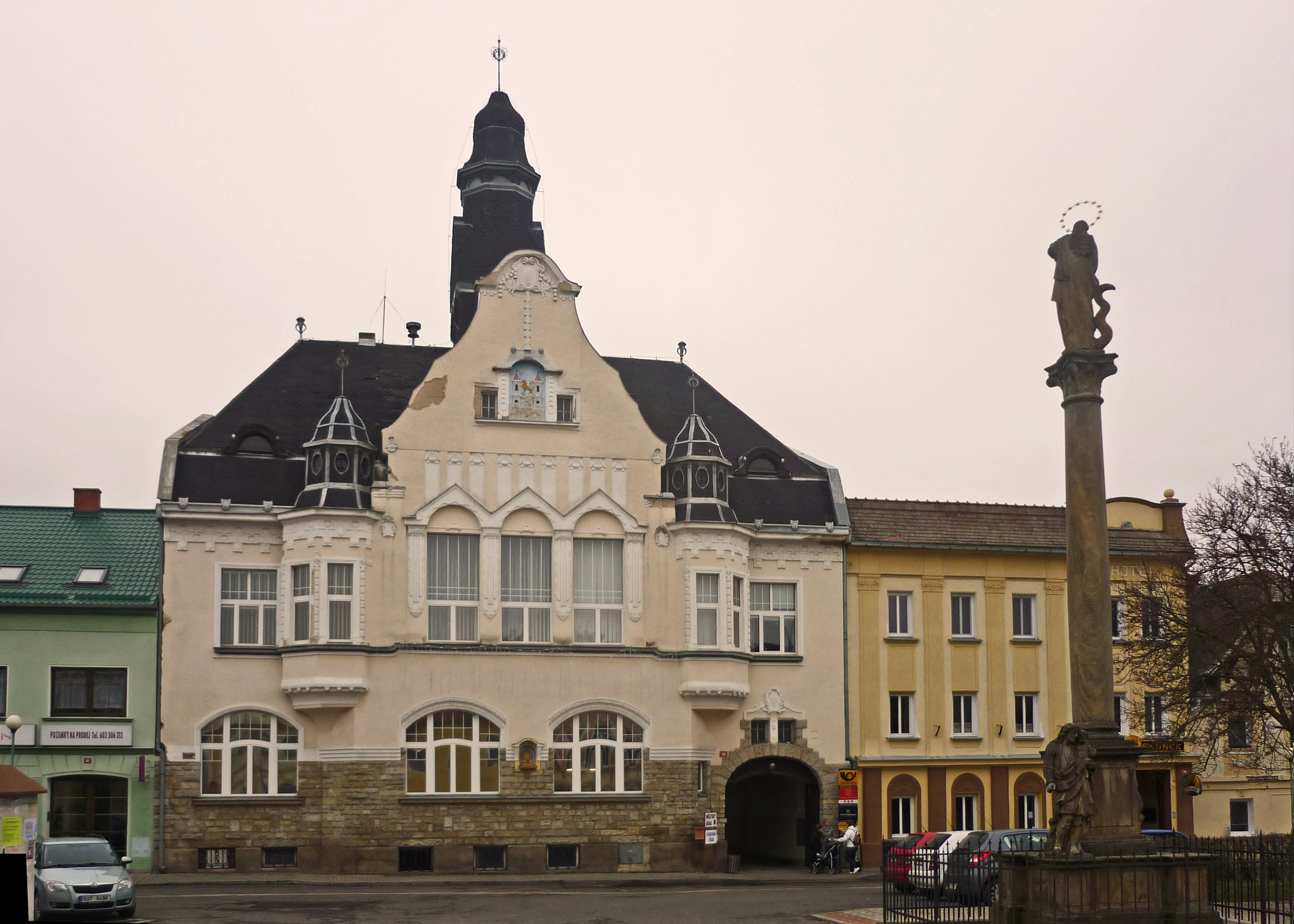
- Town hall

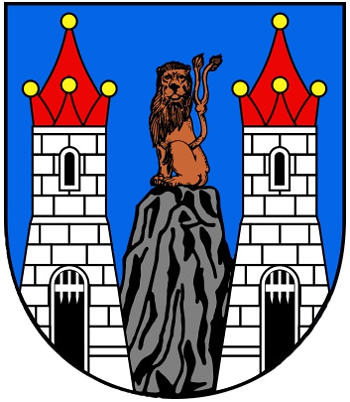
- Coat of arms

- Location in the Czech Republic
- Coordinates: 50°40′18″N 13°56′16″E
- Country: Czech Republic
- Region: Ústí nad Labem
- District: Ústí nad Labem
- First mentioned: 1352

Government
  - Mayor: Miroslav Vacek (SPD)

Area
  - Total: 16.90 km^{2} (6.53 sq mi)
- Elevation: 175 m (574 ft)

Population (2026-01-01)
  - Total: 2,564
  - Density: 151.7/km^{2} (392.9/sq mi)
- Time zone: UTC+1 (CET)
  - Summer (DST): UTC+2 (CEST)
- Postal code: 403 17
- Website: www.chabarovice.cz

Chabařovice (Czech pronunciation: [ˈxabar̝ovitsɛ]; German: Karbitz) is a town in Ústí nad Labem District in the Ústí nad Labem Region of the Czech Republic. It has about 2,600 inhabitants. The town is located on the stream Ždírnický potok in the Most Basin.

Chabařovice became a town in the first quarter of the 16th century. The historic town centre is well preserved and is protected as an urban monument zone.

== Administrative division ==
Chabařovice consists of two municipal parts (in brackets population according to the 2021 census):

- Chabařovice (2,166)
- Roudníky (294)

== Etymology ==
The initial name of Chabařovice was Chrabrovice and was derived from the personal name Chrabra, meaning "the village of Chrabra's people". Various distorted names were used in the 14th and 15th centuries. The form Chabařovice has been used since the end of the 15th century.

== Geography ==
Chabařovice is located west of Ústí nad Labem, in its immediate vicinity. It lies in the eastern tip of the Most Basin. The municipal territory is rich in fishponds, supplied mostly by the stream Ždírnický potok. There is also half of the artificial Lake Milada in the territory of Chabařovice, which is a frequent tourist destination.

== History ==
The first written mention of Chabařovice is in the list of parish churches of the Archdiocese of Prague from 1352, where the village was listed as a part of the Rýzmburk estate. During the Hussite Wars in 1426, the village was the battlefield of the Battle of Aussig between the Crusaders and the Hussites, which is considered the bloodiest battle of the Hussite Wars. In 1520, Chabařovice was mentioned as a town with the rights to brew beer and produce malt.

Until World War II, ethnic Germans made up about two thirds of the town's population. After World War II, the German-speaking population was expelled.

Coal was discovered around the town in 1774. Initially it helped the town's prosperity, but in the last quarter of the 20th century, the abolition of Chabařovice was planned for 1997 due to coal mining. In 1991, however, a government decision revoked this plan. In 1986, Chabařovice was annexed to Ústí nad Labem, but in 1990, it became again a separate town.

== Demographics ==
Historical population

Year	Pop.	±%
1869	4,211	—
1880	5,693	+35.2%
1890	6,736	+18.3%
1900	8,359	+24.1%
1910	9,566	+14.4%

Year	Pop.	±%
1921	9,107	−4.8%
1930	9,620	+5.6%
1950	5,428	−43.6%
1961	5,274	−2.8%
1970	4,811	−8.8%

Year	Pop.	±%
1980	4,002	−16.8%
1991	2,068	−48.3%
2001	2,234	+8.0%
2011	2,578	+15.4%
2021	2,460	−4.6%

Source: Censuses

== Transport ==
The D8 motorway (part of the European route E55) from Ústí nad Labem to the Czech–German border runs next to the town.

The railway line Děčín–Kadaň runs through the territory of Chabařovice, but there is no train station.

== Sport ==
Chabařovice has a motorcycle speedway stadium known as Moto Areál Chabařovice.

== Sights ==
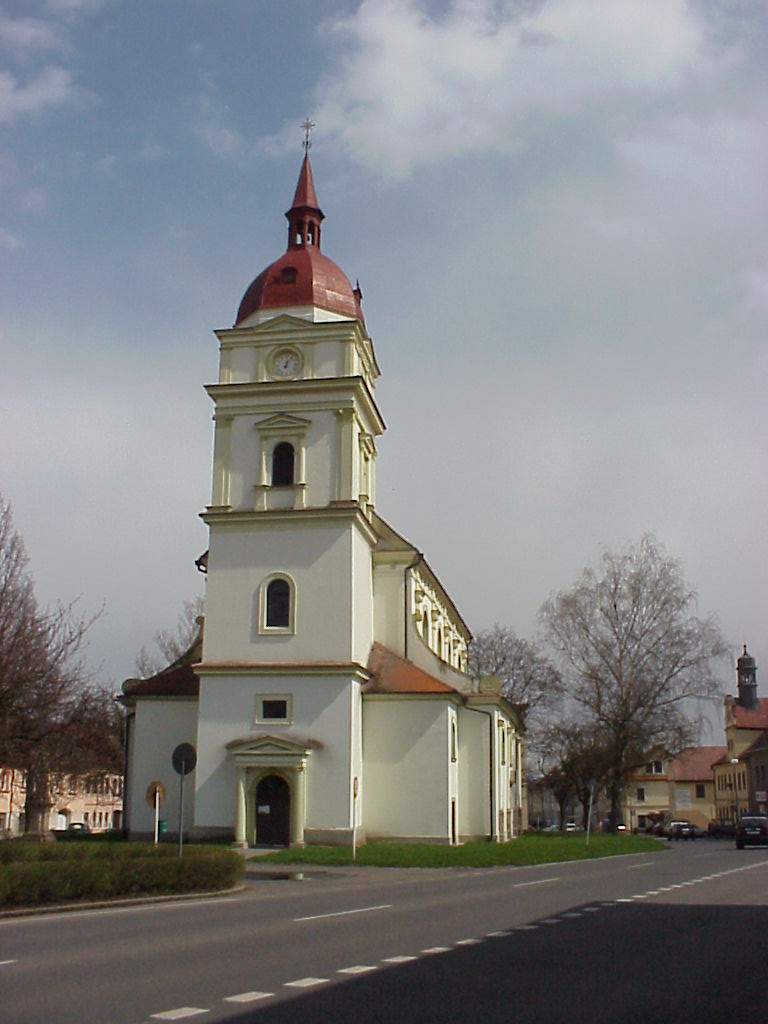
Church of the Nativity of the Virgin Mary

The main landmark of Chabařovice is the Church of the Nativity of the Virgin Mary. The original church was as old as the town. After it was severely damaged by a fire, the new church was built in 1699.

The Old Town Hall is an architecturally interesting building from 1609, which divides both town's squares. Today it serves as a cultural and social centre, and houses the Chabařovice Town Museum.

Na Běhání battlefield area, where the Battle of Aussig took place, is now a reverent area. A memorial to the battle was erected in 1953, but due to coal mining it was later dismantled. The current memorial is a copy of it and dates from 2000.

== Notable people ==
- Emmy Loose (1914–1987), Austrian operatic singer
- Ehrenfried Patzel (1914–2004), German-Czech footballer
- Michael Lüftner (born 1994), footballer

== Twin towns – sister cities ==
Chabařovice is twinned with:

- Drebach, Germany
- Ždiar, Slovakia
