= Hostomice (Teplice District) =

- Market town
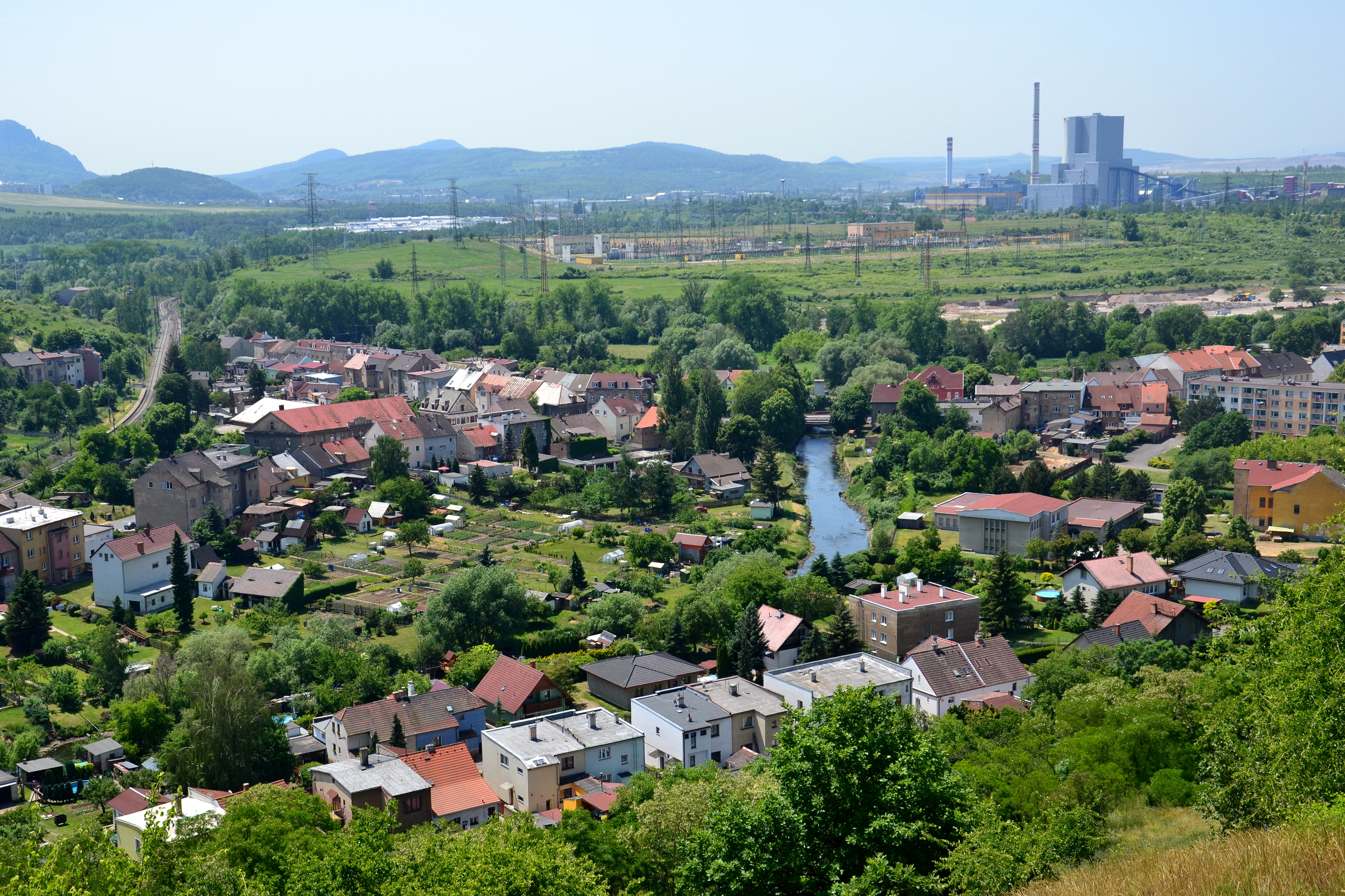
- Panorama of Hostomice

- Flag Coat of arms

- Location in the Czech Republic
- Coordinates: 50°35′16″N 13°48′29″E
- Country: Czech Republic
- Region: Ústí nad Labem
- District: Teplice
- First mentioned: 1225

Area
  - Total: 3.00 km^{2} (1.16 sq mi)
- Elevation: 193 m (633 ft)

Population (2026-01-01)
  - Total: 1,203
  - Density: 401/km^{2} (1,040/sq mi)
- Time zone: UTC+1 (CET)
  - Summer (DST): UTC+2 (CEST)
- Postal code: 417 52
- Website: www.hostomice.eu

Hostomice (Czech pronunciation: [ˈɦostomɪtsɛ]; German: Hostomitz) is a market town in Teplice District in the Ústí nad Labem Region of the Czech Republic. It has about 1,200 inhabitants.

== Etymology ==
The name is derived from the personal name Hostoma, meaning "the village of Hostoma's people".

== Geography ==
Hostomice is located about 5 kilometres (3 mi) south of Teplice and 17 km (11 mi) southwest of Ústí nad Labem. It lies no the border between the Most Basin and Central Bohemian Uplands. The highest point is at 284 m (932 ft) above sea level. The Bílina River flows through the market town. The Bouřlivec Stream joins the Bílina in Hostomice.

A notable feature of the market town's panorama is the hill Husův vrch at 266 m (873 ft) above sea level. The hill is protected as a nature monument with an area of 4.7 ha (12 acres).

== History ==
The first written mention of Hostomice is from 1225, when the village was donated to the newly established monastery in Světec.

Until the mid-19th century, Hostomice was an agricultural village. In the second half of the 19th century, glassworks and brickworks were established, and the village was industrialised. Coal was mined in the vicinity of Hostomice and a railway line was built, which led to an influx of population. In 1905, Hostomice was promoted to a market town by Emperor Franz Joseph I.

== Demographics ==
Historical population

| Year | Pop. | ±% |
|---|---|---|
| 1869 | 294 | — |
| 1880 | 794 | +170.1% |
| 1890 | 1,704 | +114.6% |
| 1900 | 3,028 | +77.7% |
| 1910 | 4,153 | +37.2% |

| Year | Pop. | ±% |
|---|---|---|
| 1921 | 3,787 | −8.8% |
| 1930 | 3,892 | +2.8% |
| 1950 | 2,323 | −40.3% |
| 1961 | 2,293 | −1.3% |
| 1970 | 1,815 | −20.8% |

| Year | Pop. | ±% |
|---|---|---|
| 1980 | 1,440 | −20.7% |
| 1991 | 1,107 | −23.1% |
| 2001 | 1,242 | +12.2% |
| 2011 | 1,178 | −5.2% |
| 2021 | 1,173 | −0.4% |

Source: Censuses

== Transport ==
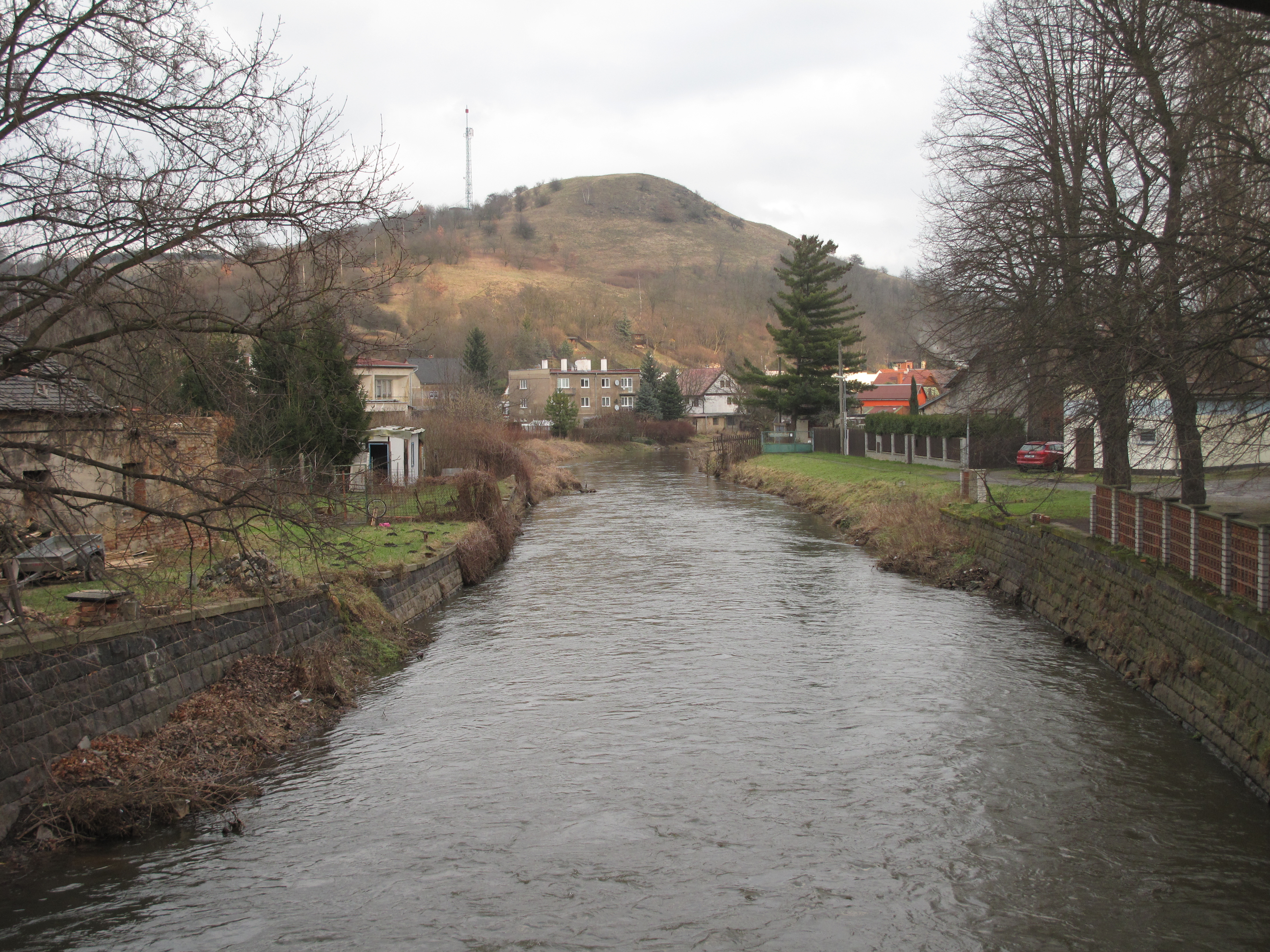
Bílina River and the hill Husův vrch

The I/13 road (the section from Most to Teplice, part of the European route E442) runs through the market town.

Hostomice is located on the railway line Ústí nad Labem–Bílina.

== Sights ==
There are no protected cultural monuments in the municipality.

== Notable people ==
- Čestmír Císař (1920–2013), politician and diplomat
