= Vera Salvequart =

Czech concentration camp personnel (1919–1947)

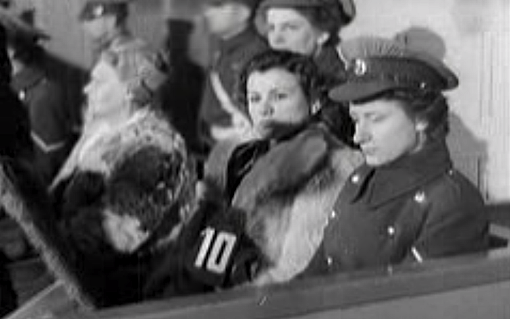
- Vera Salvequart (Number 10) at the 1st Ravensbrück Trial 1947
- Born: November 26, 1919; Ohníč, Czechoslovakia
- Died: May 3, 1947 (aged 27); Hamelin Prison, Allied-occupied Germany
- Occupation: Kapo
- Status: Executed by hanging
- Conviction: War crimes
- Trial: Hamburg Ravensbrück trials
- Penalty: Death

Vera Salvequart (26 November 1919 – 26 June 1947) was a Sudeten German nurse and kapo at Ravensbrück concentration camp from December 1944 to 1945. In 1947, she was executed for war crimes during the Holocaust following the Ravensbrück Trials.

== Nazi concentration camps ==
Born in Ohníč in Czechoslovakia in 1919, she moved to Germany sometime afterwards. She was first arrested in 1941 for having a relationship with a Jewish man and for refusing to divulge his whereabouts to the Gestapo.

She served 10 months in a prison in Flossenbürg concentration camp for that, and then in 1942, she was again arrested for another relationship with a Jew and served another two years in prison.

On 6 December 1944 she was arrested on charges of helping five detained officers escape, and was then sent to Ravensbrück, which had become a death camp for female prisoners at that point in the war.

She served in the camp's medical wing as a nurse during her stay, and oversaw the gassing of thousands of women.

Her job was to fill out death certificates for the dead and inspect their dead bodies for gold teeth.

By February 1945, she was reportedly taking a more active role in the killings; now she was poisoning the sickly in the medical wing to avoid the effort of having to transport them to the gas chambers. Although former prisoners testified about this active role, Salvequart herself would only confess to her earlier duties filling out death certificates at her trial.

== Trial and execution ==
After Ravensbrück was liberated by the Soviet Union in April 1945, she was captured, as well as the others who had served there, and held for military trials dubbed the Ravensbrück Trials. The trials described her position at Ravensbrück as that of a kapo.

At the trials, she went on record stating:

I remember that the sick had no trust in the beginning because they thought that I took part in the mass murdering. I must say that in their place, I would have had the same impression. I was locked up without interruption, couldn't go anywhere alone, and all they knew about me was that I lived there where they murdered so many people. Additionally, the prisoners saw when I entered the washroom in the case of Schikovsky; they heard the woman scream and therefore assumed that I was part of the murder.

In her own defense, she claimed that she had acted in a benevolent fashion towards the prisoners, and described how she saved some women and children from death by substituting their camp identification number with that of those already dead.

She claimed to have kept one infant hidden and had male prisoners bring food and milk for him. For suspected insubordination, she claimed, the SS had threatened to send her to the gas chambers herself, until several male prisoners who appreciated what she did, disguised her as a male prisoner; a guise she kept up until the end of the war at which point the allies found her en route to a camp for released prisoners.

Salvequart also claimed that one of her lovers was a British spy. She appealed for clemency on the basis of having stolen schematics for the V-2 rockets being produced at the camp prior to 1944, hoping to smuggle it to the British; she was granted a temporary reprieve while this was taken into consideration.

However, clemency was denied, and on 26 June 1947, Salvequart was hanged by Albert Pierrepoint at Hamelin Prison. Shortly afterwards, her body was buried with the other executed war criminals at Wehl Cemetery in Hameln.
