= Blatno (Chomutov District) =

- Municipality
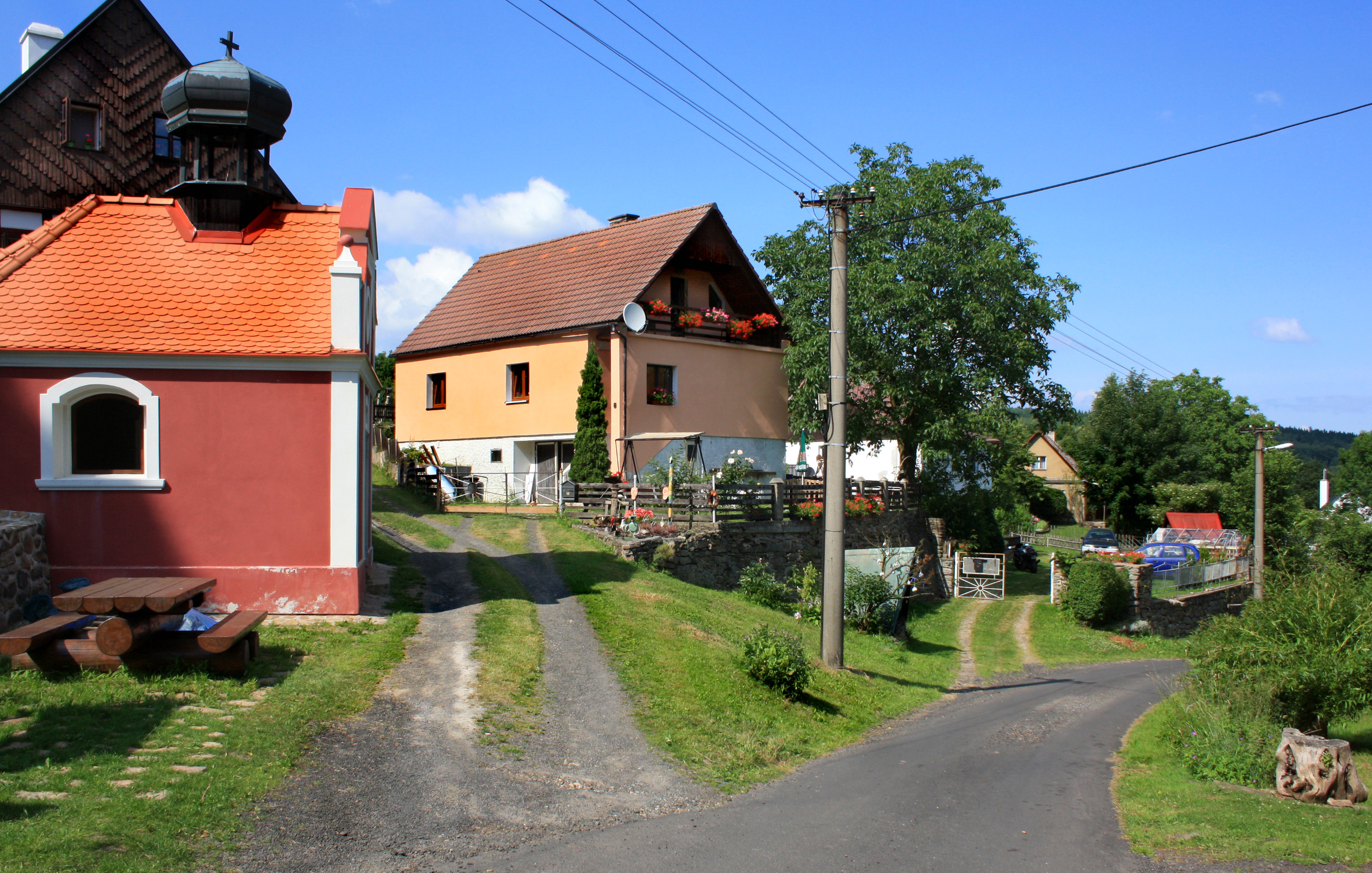
- Hrádečná, a part of Blatno

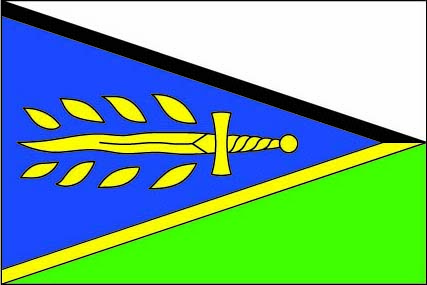
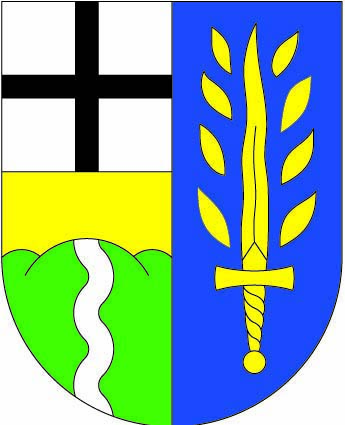
- Flag Coat of arms

- Location in the Czech Republic
- Coordinates: 50°30′42″N 13°21′29″E
- Country: Czech Republic
- Region: Ústí nad Labem
- District: Chomutov
- First mentioned: 1352

Area
  - Total: 45.34 km^{2} (17.51 sq mi)
- Elevation: 660 m (2,170 ft)

Population (2026-01-01)
  - Total: 627
  - Density: 13.8/km^{2} (35.8/sq mi)
- Time zone: UTC+1 (CET)
  - Summer (DST): UTC+2 (CEST)
- Postal code: 430 01
- Website: www.obec-blatno.cz

Blatno (German: Platten) is a municipality and village in Chomutov District in the Ústí nad Labem Region of the Czech Republic. It has about 600 inhabitants.

Blatno lies approximately 6 kilometres (4 mi) north-west of Chomutov, 52 km (32 mi) west of Ústí nad Labem, and 90 km (56 mi) north-west of Prague. The Bílina River originates in the municipal territory.

== Administrative division ==
Blatno consists of eight municipal parts (in brackets population according to the 2021 census):

- Blatno (249)
- Bečov (62)
- Hrádečná (64)
- Květnov (23)
- Mezihoří (49)
- Radenov (33)
- Šerchov (51)
- Zákoutí (64)

== Demographics ==
Historical population
Year	Pop.	±%
1869	1,870	—
1880	1,808	−3.3%
1890	1,740	−3.8%
1900	1,926	+10.7%
1910	1,664	−13.6%
1921	1,651	−0.8%
1930	1,524	−7.7%
1950	422	−72.3%
1961	452	+7.1%
1970	304	−32.7%
1980	305	+0.3%
1991	224	−26.6%
2001	315	+40.6%
2011	437	+38.7%
2021	595	+36.2%
Source: Censuses
