= Irena Bernášková =

Czechoslovak journalist and resistance member (1904–1942)

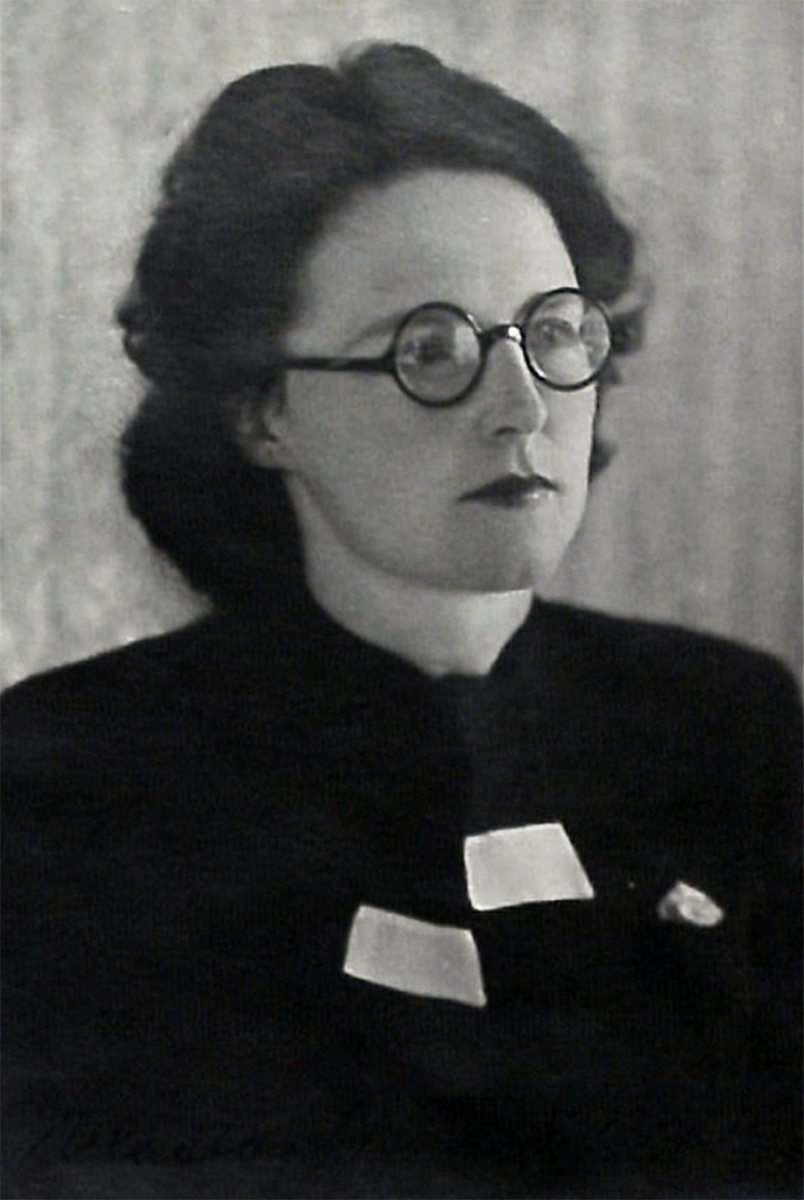
- Born: Irena Preissigová; 7 February 1904; Prague, Austria-Hungary
- Died: 26 August 1942 (aged 38); Plötzensee Prison, Berlin, Nazi Germany
- Cause of death: Execution by guillotine
- Known for: resistance activities

Irena "Inka" Bernášková (7 February 1904 – 26 August 1942) was a Czechoslovak journalist and resistance member who was active in the fight against the German occupation during World War II. She was the first Czech woman sentenced to death by the People's Court in Berlin.

== Childhood and youth ==
Bernášková was born in Prague as the second of three daughters of painter Vojtěch Preissig. During World War I, the family resided in Boston, United States. Their villa in Boston became an important center of meetings of politicians and statesmen fighting for Czechoslovak independence. Personalities such as Tomáš Garrigue Masaryk, Edvard Beneš and Milan Rastislav Štefánik visited their house. Irena returned to Czechoslovakia along with her sisters in 1921. In 1925, in Prague, she married her cousin, František Bernášek. Her parents did not approve of the marriage and her father even cut off all contact with her for four years. The couple settled in a villa in the Spořilov area of Prague. During the Munich crisis mobilization, Bernášková volunteered as a Red Cross nurse and helped refugees from the occupied Czechoslovak border area.

== Resistance and death ==
During the occupation of Czechoslovakia by German troops she started to distribute leaflets and began collaborating with her father on publishing the illegal magazine V boj ("Into Combat") in 1939. She also helped to organize illegal transfers across the border with Slovakia. Although the Gestapo searched for her, she managed to avoid arrest and continued to publish the magazine.

She was arrested on 21 September 1940 in Prague, Poříčí Street, with false documents. During the interrogation, she tried to accept all the blame herself and saved a number of other resistance members. Still, members of her family were arrested – her husband died in the Buchenwald concentration camp, her father in the concentration camp in Dachau. Bernášková was the first Czech woman convicted and sentenced to death by the Nazis. She was sentenced on 5 March 1942, and then guillotined at the end of August 1942 in Plötzensee Prison, Berlin.

== Aftermath ==
In 1946, she was awarded the Czechoslovak War Cross, in memoriam. In 1998 she was posthumously awarded the Medal for Heroism by President Václav Havel.

== See also ==
- Marie Kudeříková
- Anna Letenská
