= Lake Milada =

Lake in Ústí nad Labem Region, Czech Republic

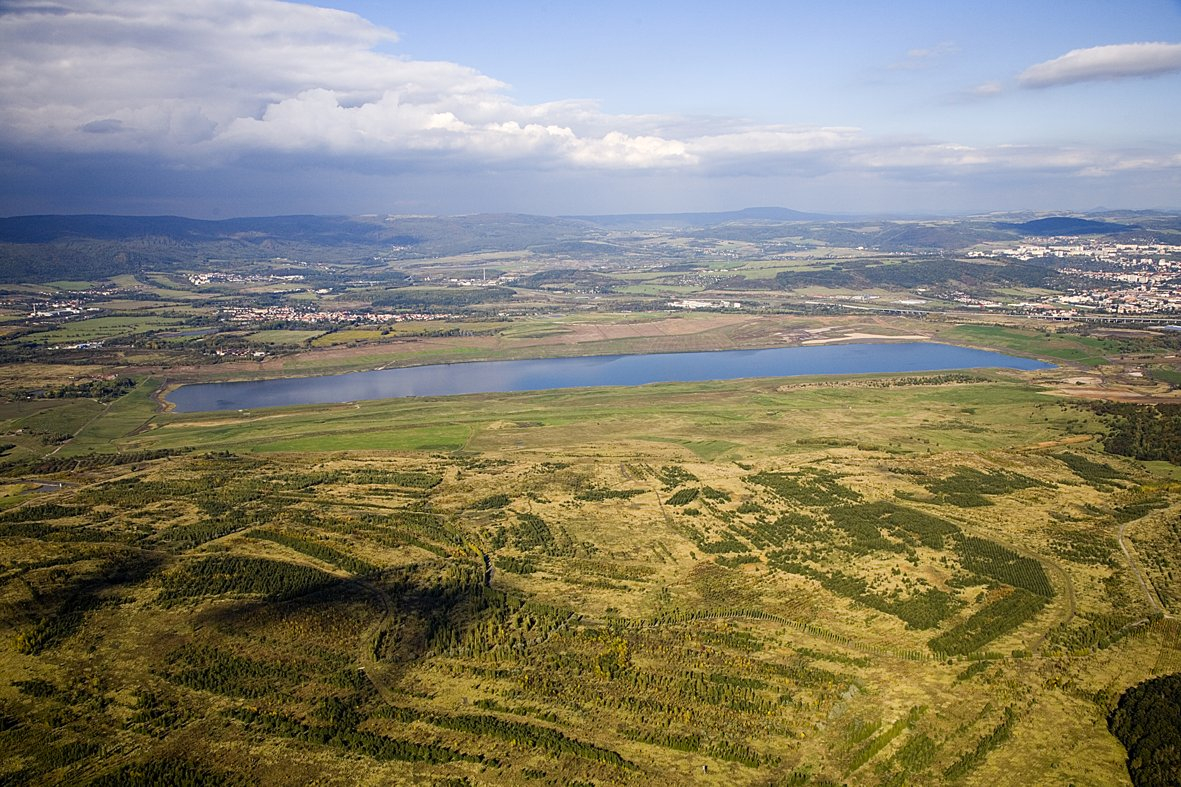
- The reservoir in September 2007

- Location within Czech Republic
- Coordinates: 50°39′13″N 13°56′40″E
- Lake type: Artificial
- Basin countries: Czech Republic
- Surface area: 2.52 km^{2} (0.97 sq mi)
- Average depth: 15.5 m (51 ft)
- Max. depth: 24.7 m (81 ft)
- Water volume: 35,000,000 m^{3} (1.2×10^{9} cu ft)
- Surface elevation: 137 m (449 ft)
- Settlements: Chabařovice, Ústí nad Labem

Lake Milada (Czech: Jezero Milada; formerly also known as Lake Chabařovice) is an artificial lake near Ústí nad Labem in the Czech Republic. It originated from excavation by an old coal mine and flooded former villages, Hrbovice, Tuchomyšl and Vyklice. The lake has an area of 252 ha (620 acres). Its maximum depth is 24.7 m (81 ft).

== Location ==
Lake Milada lies in the Most Basin lowland. It is located in the Ústí nad Labem Region, in the municipal territories of Chabařovice and Ústí nad Labem. A negligible part also extends into the territory of Trmice.

== Water mode ==
In 1998, the mining of brown coal in Chabařovice ceased and the quarry was closed. Recultivation work started subsequently. The former Chabařovice quarry was the first of large surface mines within the Czech Republic in which redevelopment and reclamation works, after termination of mining, came to the stage when the remnant den was filled with water. It became a model for other localities.

The watering started on 15 June 2001. The reservoir is the second largest reclaimed lake within northern Czech Republic. The recultivation is based on the hydric system, concretely the watering. The maximum watering speed is 700 L/s and is processed by a water relief from the Kateřina reservoir. At the present time some land is being prepared for investment and the area is being opened to the public. Mild local climate change is expected in the direct surroundings following the creation of the lake, such as an increase in fogs, less dustiness and temperature stabilization.

The water quality is one of the key criteria, which is monitored and will be helpful for projection of the hydric recultivation in another region.

== Utilization ==
The lake is partly used for recreational purposes – for bathing, swimming, sailing, cycling, roller skating, jogging, horse riding etc. Fishing is forbidden.

In 2006 originated the Association of five communes called Jezero Milada (Lake Milada). These five communes are Ústí nad Labem, Chabařovice, Trmice, Řehlovice and Modlany. The financial resources of the Association and the city of Ústí nad Labem were used on setting out the cycling path 3009. Cycling path with marking 3009 was opened in 2006 and it goes through the territory of outside dump of the mine with line up to Habří and Řehlovice. In Chabařovice it connects the already built cycling path of the Czech Tourist Club with the same marking, then it goes around lake, diverges across paths in the area and finally it leads to Stadice.

In July 2022 this lake was used to take water with two Canadair aircraft for aerial firefighting at Bohemian Switzerland National Park.
