= Ohníč =

- Municipality
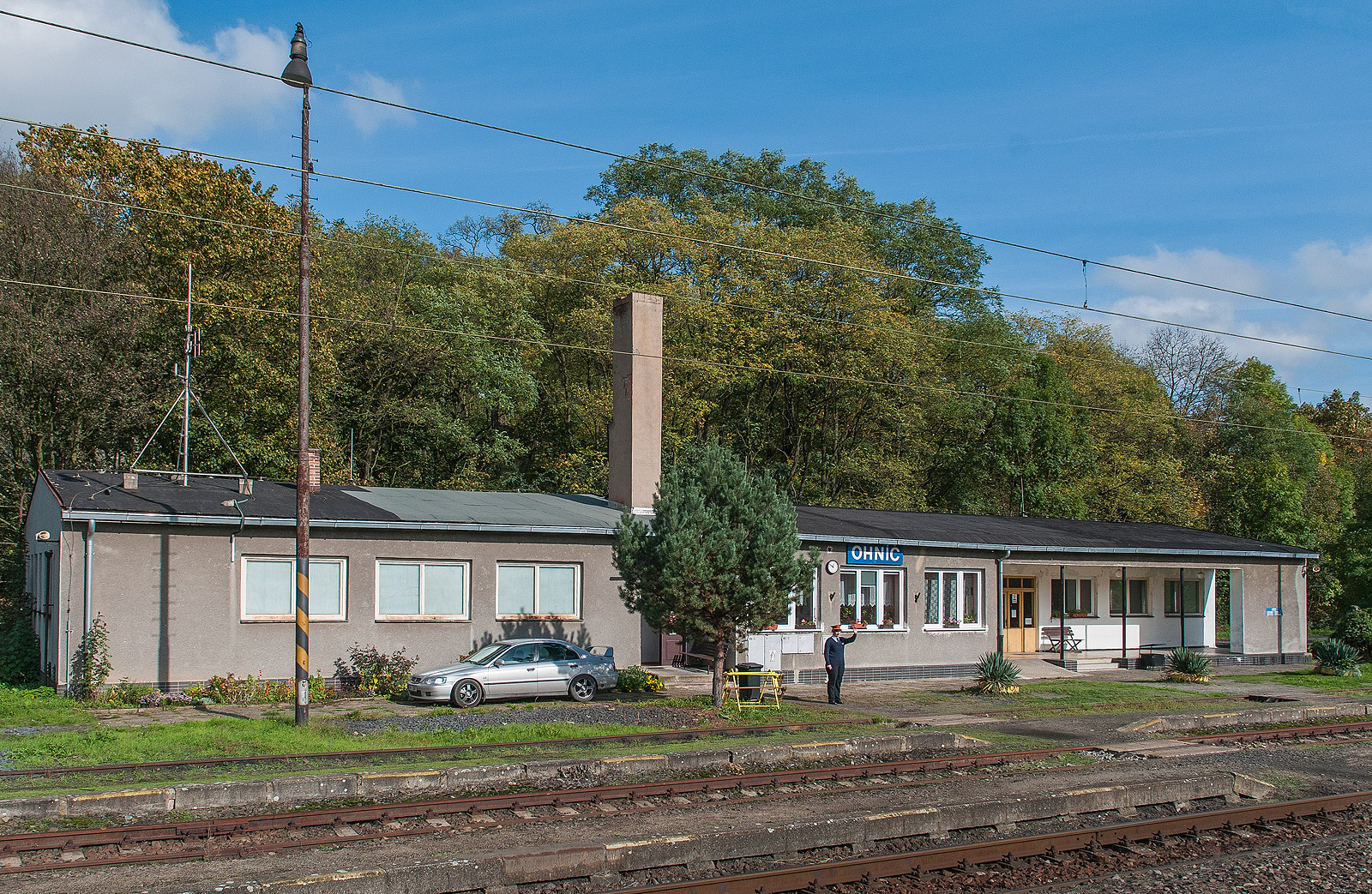
- Train station

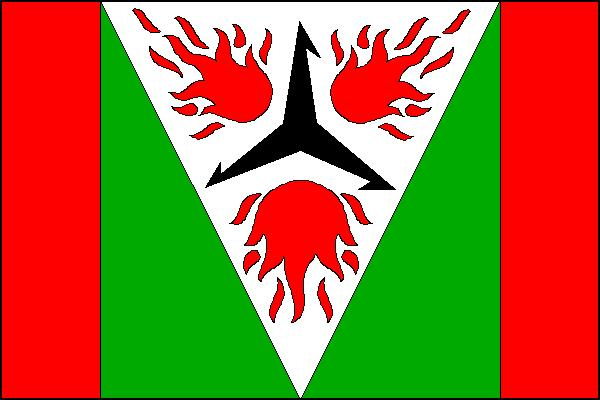
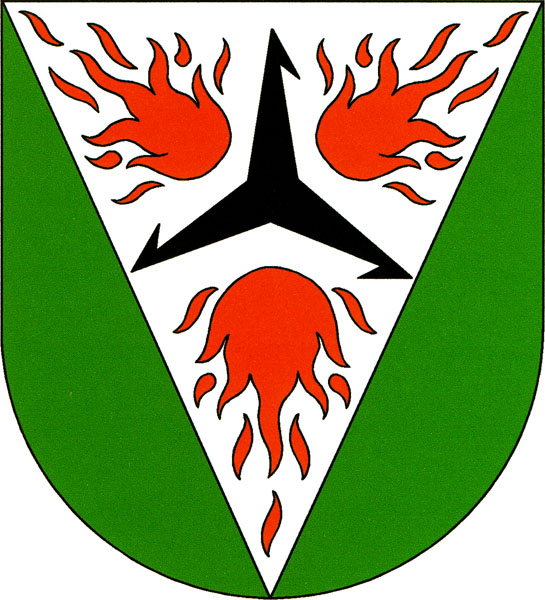
- Flag Coat of arms

- Location in the Czech Republic
- Coordinates: 50°35′14″N 13°50′41″E
- Country: Czech Republic
- Region: Ústí nad Labem
- District: Teplice
- First mentioned: 1404

Area
  - Total: 7.07 km^{2} (2.73 sq mi)
- Elevation: 195 m (640 ft)

Population (2026-01-01)
  - Total: 697
  - Density: 98.6/km^{2} (255/sq mi)
- Time zone: UTC+1 (CET)
  - Summer (DST): UTC+2 (CEST)
- Postal code: 417 65
- Website: www.ohnic.cz

Ohníč (German: Wohontsch) is a municipality and village in Teplice District in the Ústí nad Labem Region of the Czech Republic. It has about 700 inhabitants.

Ohníč lies approximately 6 kilometres (4 mi) south-east of Teplice, 16 km (9.9 mi) south-west of Ústí nad Labem, and 69 km (43 mi) north-west of Prague.

== Administrative division ==
Ohníč consists of five municipal parts (in brackets population according to the 2021 census):

- Ohníč (202)
- Dolánky (23)
- Křemýž (355)
- Němečky (140)
- Pňovičky (32)

== Demographics ==
Historical population
Year	Pop.	±%
1869	715	—
1880	1,080	+51.0%
1890	985	−8.8%
1900	1,498	+52.1%
1910	2,074	+38.5%
1921	2,141	+3.2%
1930	2,174	+1.5%
1950	1,336	−38.5%
1961	1,299	−2.8%
1970	1,148	−11.6%
1980	943	−17.9%
1991	756	−19.8%
2001	753	−0.4%
2011	740	−1.7%
2021	752	+1.6%
Source: Censuses

== Notable people ==
- Vera Salvequart (1919–1947), nurse and concentration camp kapo
