= Světec =

- Municipality
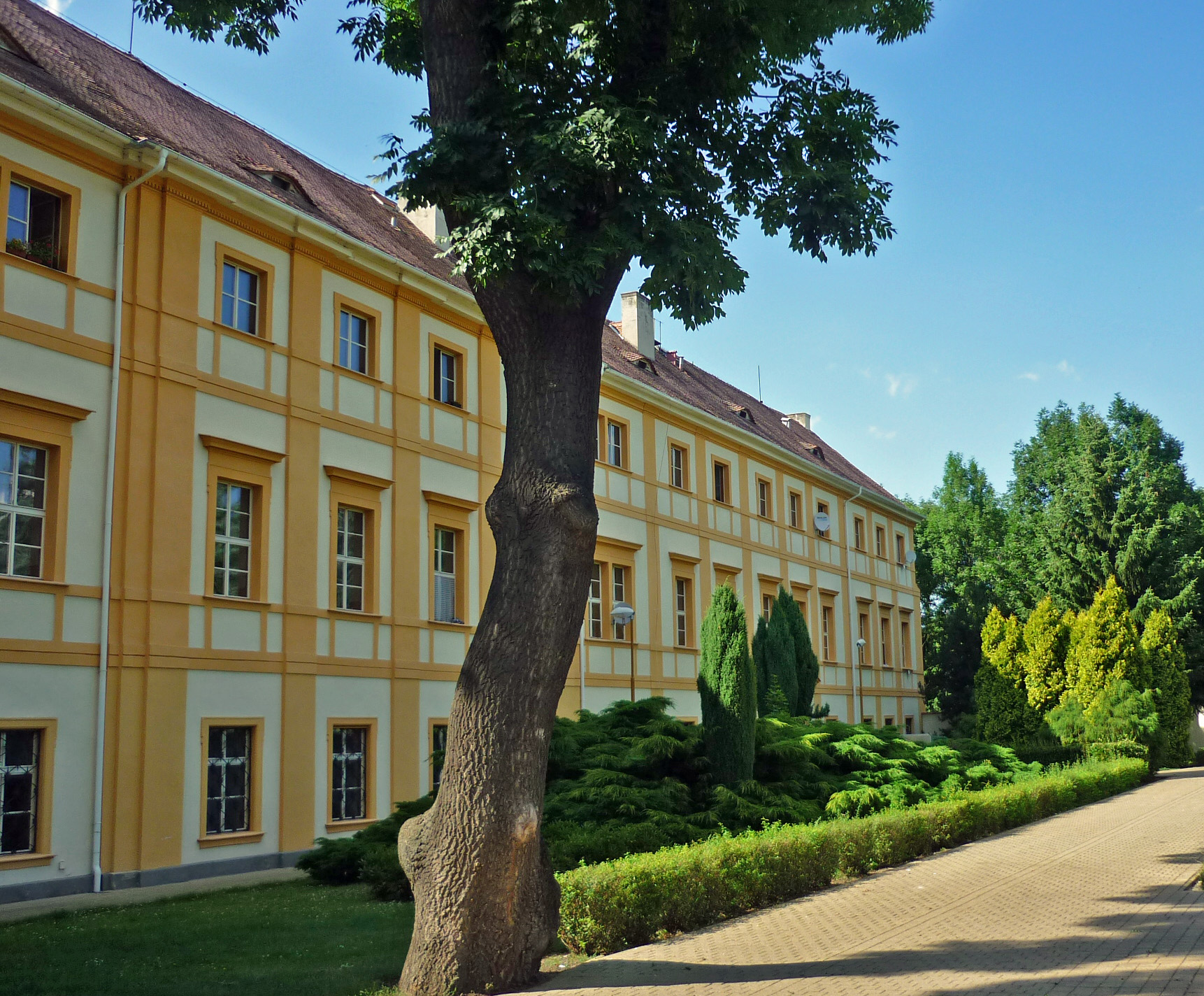
- Castle in Světec

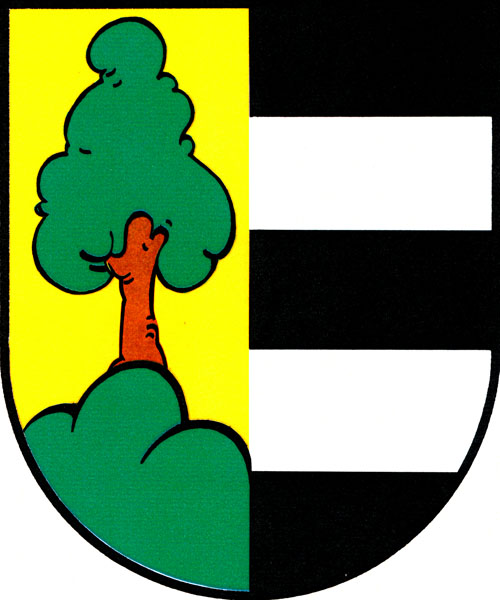
- Flag Coat of arms

- Location in the Czech Republic
- Coordinates: 50°34′34″N 13°48′42″E
- Country: Czech Republic
- Region: Ústí nad Labem
- District: Teplice
- First mentioned: 1209

Area
  - Total: 12.34 km^{2} (4.76 sq mi)
- Elevation: 210 m (690 ft)

Population (2026-01-01)
  - Total: 977
  - Density: 79.2/km^{2} (205/sq mi)
- Time zone: UTC+1 (CET)
  - Summer (DST): UTC+2 (CEST)
- Postal code: 417 53
- Website: www.obec-svetec.cz

Světec (German: Schwaz) is a municipality and village in Teplice District in the Ústí nad Labem Region of the Czech Republic. It has about 1,000 inhabitants.

Světec lies approximately 7 kilometres (4 mi) south of Teplice, 19 km (12 mi) south-west of Ústí nad Labem, and 69 km (43 mi) north-west of Prague.

== Administrative division ==
Světec consists of four municipal parts (in brackets population according to the 2021 census):

- Světec (458)
- Chotějovice (308)
- Štrbice (166)
- Úpoř (59)

== Demographics ==
Historical population
Year	Pop.	±%
1869	1,183	—
1880	1,834	+55.0%
1890	1,961	+6.9%
1900	2,731	+39.3%
1910	3,264	+19.5%
1921	3,196	−2.1%
1930	3,380	+5.8%
1950	2,329	−31.1%
1961	2,052	−11.9%
1970	1,621	−21.0%
1980	1,209	−25.4%
1991	872	−27.9%
2001	939	+7.7%
2011	1,003	+6.8%
2021	991	−1.2%
Source: Censuses

== Notable people ==
- Vojtěch Preissig (1873–1944), painter and illustrator
