= List of Baroque residences =

This is a list of Baroque palaces and residences built in the late 17th and 18th centuries. Baroque architecture is a building style of the Baroque era, begun in late 16th-century Italy and spread in Europe. The style took the Roman vocabulary of Renaissance architecture and used it in a new rhetorical and theatrical fashion, often to express the triumph of the Catholic Church and the absolutist state in defiance of the Reformation.

Baroque architecture often includes fragmentary or deliberately incomplete architectural elements, opulent use of colour and ornaments, and an external façade often characterized by a dramatic central projection. Many European palaces drew inspiration from the Palace of Versailles, started in 1682, which had previously been inspired by the Buen Retiro Palace, making it one of the most imitated buildings of the 17th century.

This list includes important city residences, such as the Stockholm Palace and Winter Palace, but does not extend to pre-Versailles Roman palazzi, such as Palazzo Pamphilj, Palazzo Doria-Pamphili, Palazzo Altieri, Palazzo Barberini, Palazzo Chigi, Palace of the Teutonic Order, Palazzo Massimo di Rignano Colonna, Palazzo Maruscelli-Lepri, Palazzo Ludovisi or Palazzo Muti Papazzurri.

Country	Image	Name	Location	First owner
Austria		Schönbrunn Palace	Vienna	Empress Maria Theresa
Austria		Belvedere Palace	Vienna	Eugene of Savoy
Austria		Schloss Laxenburg	Laxenburg	Empress Maria Theresa
Austria		Palais Schwarzenberg	Vienna	Adam Franz von Schwarzenberg
Austria		Schloss Halbturn	Halbturn	Harrach family
Austria		Schloss Esterházy	Eisenstadt	Pál Esterházy
Austria		Schloss Eggenberg	Graz	Hans Ulrich von Eggenberg
Austria		Schloss Trautenfels	Pürgg-Trautenfels	Siegmund Friedrich von Trauttmansdorff
Austria		Palais Auersperg	Vienna	Hieronymus Capece de Rofrano
Austria	Engelhartstetten - Schloss Hof (1)	Schloss Hof	Marchfeld	Prince Eugene of Savoy
Austria	Engelhartstetten - Schloss Niederweiden (1)	Schloss Niederweiden	Marchfeld	Ernst Rüdiger von Starhemberg
Austria	Penzinger Straße 34 - Töpfelhaus	Töpfelhaus	Vienna	Alexander Matthias and Katharina Töpfel
Austria	Freyung 4	Palais Kinsky	Vienna	Count Wirich Philipp von Daun
Austria	Palais Lobkowitz3	Palais Lobkowitz, Vienna	Vienna	Philipp Sigmund of Dietrichstein
Austria	Palais Trautson	Palais Trautson	Vienna	Johann Leopold Donat von Trautson, Prince of Trautson
Austria	Palais Bartolotti-Partenfeld Vienna June 2006 373	Palais Bartolotti-Partenfeld	Vienna	Bartolotti noble family
Austria	Palais Chotek-Währingerstr 28	Palais Chotek	Vienna	Chotek family
Austria	WienPalaisObizzi	Palais Obizzi	Vienna	Ferdinand Marchese von Obizzi
Austria	Palais Mollard-Clary, 2019 (01)	Palais Mollard-Clary	Vienna	Imperial Count Franz Maximilian von Mollard
Austria	Palais Caprara-Geymueller panoramic	Palais Caprara-Geymüller	Vienna	Enea Silvio Count of Caprara
Austria	Schloss Neuwaldegg 7	Schloss Neuwaldegg	Vienna	Count Theodor von Strattmann
Austria	Wien - Palais Augarten (2)	Palais Augarten	Vienna	Zacharias Leeb
Austria	Freyung 3	Palais Harrach	Vienna	Harrach family
Austria	Josefstädter Str 39 - 2	Palais Strozzi	Vienna	Strozzi family
Austria	Pallais Esterhazy-IMG 9057	Palais Esterházy	Vienna	Esterházy family
Austria	Klessheim-2012	Schloss Klessheim	Wals-Siezenheim	Johann Ernst von Thun
Austria	Winterpalais Prinz Eugen	Winter Palace of Prince Eugene	Vienna	Prince Eugene of Savoy
Austria	Schloss Hetzendorf Innenhof	Schloss Hetzendorf	Vienna	
Austria	Obersiebenbrunn - Schloss (1)	Schloss Obersiebenbrunn	Obersiebenbrunn	Prince Eugene of Savoy
Austria	GuentherZ 01-2003-1225 Riegersburg NOe	Schloss Ruegers	Riegersburg	
Austria		Schloss Riegersburg	Hardegg, Lower Austria	
Austria	Schloss Frohsdorf 01	Schloss Frohsdorf	Lanzenkirchen	Count Franz Carl Hoyos
Belarus		Sviack Palace	Sviack	Józef Wołłowicz
Belarus		Niasviž Castle	Niasviž	Radziwiłł family
Belgium	Les Waleffes CH0JPG	Waleffe Castle	Les Waleffes	Blaise Henri de Corte
Belgium	Château de Warfusée	Castle of Warfusée	Saint-Georges-sur-Meuse	Florent Henri Emile, Count of Oultremont and Warfusée
Belgium		Palace of Charles of Lorraine	Brussels	Prince Charles Alexander of Lorraine
Belgium	Belgique - Bruxelles - Maison de l'Âne - 01	House of the Donkey	Brussels	
Belgium	Belgique - Bruxelles - Maison du Marchand d'Or - 01	House of the Gold Merchant	Brussels	Corneille Mombaerts
Belgium	Maison de Goude Huyve 07	House of Goude Huyve	Brussels	
Belgium	Belgique - Bruxelles - Maison de l'Ange - 00	House of the Angel	Brussels	Jan De Vos
Belgium	Belgique - Bruxelles - Grand-Place - Maison du Cygne - 01b	House of the Swan	Brussels	Pierre Fariseau
Belgium	Hoboken Sorghvliedt 6	Sorghvliedt Castle	Hoboken	Arnold du Bois
Belgium	RococcokasteelBommershoven 8-02-2008 15-24-09	Bommershoven Castle	Borgloon	Marcel-Gérard Magnée
Belgium	Beveren Doel Hooghuisstraat 8 - 107682 - onroerenderfgoed	Hooghuis	Doel	Jan Willemsen
Belgium	Kasteel van Modave 13-05-2021 12-49-43	Château de Modave	Liège Province, Wallonia	Jean-Gaspard-Ferdinand de Marchin
Belgium		Château de Belœil	Belœil, province of Hainaut, Wallonia	Ligne family
Belgium	LIEGE Hôtel d'Ansembourg - rue Feronstrée 114 (1 - 2012)	Hôtel d'Ansembourg	Liège Province, Wallonia	Michel Willems
Belgium	Haus Vercken 01	Vercken House	Eupen	Leonhard Vercken
Belgium	Eupen Tuchverlegergebäude Gran Ry Klötzerbahn 34, heute Regierung DG	House Grand Ry	Eupen	Nikolaus Joseph von Grand Ry
Belgium	Gent Koninklijke Academie 007	House of Oombergen	Ghent	David 't Kindt
Belgium	77629 machelen kasteel beaulieu	Beaulieu Castle	Machelen	Lamoral II Claudius Franz, Count of Thurn and Taxis
Belgium	De Pinte Zevergem Boeregemstraat 25 - 248925 - onroerenderfgoed	Boeregem Castle	Zevergem	
Belgium	Gent Hoogstraat 36 - 178488 - onroerenderfgoed	Mansion Hotel Reylof	Ghent	Baron Reylof
Belgium	Lochristi Nerenhoek 37 - 384123 - onroerenderfgoed	Kasteel van de Woestijne	Lochristi	Jan Baptist van de Woestijne, canon of Sint-Baafs in Ghent
Belgium	Oosterzele Oosterzele Keiberg 50 kasteel Smissenbroek - 224742 - onroerenderfgoed	Smissenbroeck Castle	Oosterzele	
Belgium	Deulin JPG01	Deulin Castle	Deulin	Guillaume-Joseph de Harlez
Croatia		Eltz Manor	Vukovar	Eltz
Czech Republic	Červený Hrádek - zámek	The Red Castle	Červený Hrádek	Jan Adam Hrzán from Harasov
Czech Republic	Cechtice zamek	Čechtice Palace	Čechtice	František Antonín Josef, Count of Holleweil
Czech Republic	Chlumec - Karlova koruna	Karlova Koruna Château	Chlumec nad Cidlinou	František Ferdinand Kinský
Czech Republic	Lovecký zámek Ohrada - průčelí	Ohrada Hunting Castle	Hluboka nad Vltavou	Adam František Karel Eusebius Prince of Schwarzenberg
Czech Republic	Hořín, zámek Hořín 3	Hořín Palace	Hořín	Heřman Jakub Count Černín of Chudenice
Czech Republic	Horní Police zámek 1	Castle at Horní Police	Horní Police	Julius Francis, Duke of Saxe-Lauenburg
Czech Republic	Castle Horineves west donjon	Horiněves Castle	Horiněves	Imperial Count General Jan Antonín Špork
Czech Republic	Hradec Králové - biskupský palác	Bishop's Palace	Hradec Králové	Imperial Count Jan Bedrich (Fridrich) of Valdštejn, 2nd Bishop of Hradec Králové, 16th Archbishop of Prague, 31st Grandmaster of the Order of the Red Star Crusaders
Czech Republic		Jarmeritz Palace	Jaroměřice nad Rokytnou	Johann Adam von Questenberg
Czech Republic	Wallenstein's Palace in Jičín - panoramio	Valdštejnský Palace	Jičín	Trčkovés from Lípa
Czech Republic		Kroměříž Palace	Kroměříž	Karl von Liechtenstein-Kastelkorn
Czech Republic	Lázně Bělohrad - zámek	Palace at Lázně Bělohrad	Lázně Bělohrad	Bertold Vilém of Valdštejn
Czech Republic	Zámek Líšeň 2	Lišen Palace	Lišen	Jan Kryštof from Freyenfels
Czech Republic	2019-11-06 13-04-05 Pentax JH	Mikulov Castle	Mikulov	Prince Ferdinand of Ditrichštejn
Czech Republic	Měšice, zámek	Castle in Měšice	Měšice	František Václav Nostic-Rieneck
Czech Republic	Ořechov - zámek (6)	Ořechov Castle	Ořechov	
Czech Republic	Zámek v Pohledu	Palace at Pohled	Pohled	Order of the Cistercians
Czech Republic	Postoloprty 2016-09-25 Zámek z mostu	Postoloprty Castle	Postoloprty	Stephan Georg of Sternberg
Czech Republic	Kolowrat - čelo	Kolowrat Palace	Prague	Kolowrat Family
Czech Republic	Prag Wallensteinpalatset	Valdštejnský Palace	Prague	Generalissimo Albrecht von Wallenstein, Prince of Wenden and Duke of Friedland, Sagan, Glogau and Mecklenburg
Czech Republic	Nerudova Kolovratský palác průčelí 3	Kolovrat Palace	Prague	The Lords of Hradec
Czech Republic	Praha, Hrad, Staré proboštství 2	Old Provost's House	Prague	Jan František Rasch from Aschenfeld, Provost of the Chapter of St. Vitus in Prague
Czech Republic	Michnův palác dvůr 1a	Michna Palace	Prague	Pavel Michna from Vacínov
Czech Republic	Sasko-lauenburský palác 01	Saxe-Lauenburg Palace (in its Baroque form)	Prague	The Metropolitan Chapter of St. Vitus in Prague
Czech Republic	Jelení příkop̠ - Masarykova vyhlídka 01	Šternberský Palace	Prague	Count Václav Vojtěch of Šternberk
Czech Republic	Hrzánský palác - čelo	Hrzánský palace	Prague	Count Zikmund Valentin Hrzán of Harasov
Czech Republic	Prague, Czech Republic, April 2016 - 146	Kaiserstein Palace	Prague	František Helfrýd, free lord from Kaiserstein
Czech Republic	Malá Strana Buquoyský palác 1 (2)	Buquoy Palace	Prague	Imperial Count Jan Bedrich of Valdštejn
Czech Republic	Malá Strana Velkopřevorský palác 2	The Grand Prior's Palace	Prague	Grand Prior Gundakar Poppa of Ditrichštejn
Czech Republic		Troja Palace	Prague	Wenzel Adalbert von Sternberg
Czech Republic		Villa Amerika	Prague	Vaclav Michna
Czech Republic		Archbishops' Palace	Prague	Archbishops of Prague
Czech Republic		Kinský Palace	Prague	Johann Ernst von der Goltz
Czech Republic		Palais Thun-Hohenstein	Prague	Michael Oswald Thun
Czech Republic	Valdstejnsky Palace garden autumn	Wallenstein Palace	Prague	Albrecht von Wallenstein
Czech Republic	Praha, Hradčany, Černínský palác 02	Czernin Palace	Prague	Humprecht Jan Czernin
Czech Republic	ValkounskyDum01	Valkounsky House	Prague	Jan Blažej Santini-Aichel
Czech Republic	Prague CZ Old Town Marian Square Clam-Gallas Palace 0124	Clam-Gallas Palace	Prague	Count John Wenceslaus of Gallas, Viceroy of Naples
Czech Republic	Malá Strana Jägerův dům	Dům U Černého Noha	Prague	Josef Jäger
Czech Republic	Palác Turbů, Malá Strana 03	Palace of the Turbos	Prague	Turbo Family
Czech Republic	Praha 1, Malostranské náměstí 18-6 20170809 004	Smiřických Palace	Prague	Jaroslav I. Smiřický from Smiřice
Czech Republic	Prague Mala Strana St. Nicholas-02	Grömling Palace	Prague	Charles of Grömling
Czech Republic	Romanian embassy Prague 2851	Morzinský Palace	Prague	Václav Humbert, Count of Morzin
Czech Republic		Münchengrätz Residence	Mnichovo Hradiště	Ernst Josef von Waldstein
Czech Republic	Castle Mirosov 1	Mirošov Castle	Mirošov (Rokycany District)	Jan Antonín Vratislav
Czech Republic	Nebilovy zamek	Nebílovy Castle	Nebílovy	Černin family
Czech Republic		Neuschloss Residence	Nové Hrady	Jean-Antoine Harbouval de Chamaré
Czech Republic	Ostrov zámek jižní křídlo	Palace at Ostrov	Ostrov	Francis Julius of Saxe-Lauenburg
Czech Republic	Petrohrad zámek nároží	Petrohrad	Petrohrad	Heřman Jakub Gottlieb Černín Count of Chudenice
Czech Republic	Postoloprty 2016-09-25 Zámek z mostu	Postoloprty Castle	Postoloprty	Stephan Georg of Sternberg
Czech Republic		Austerlitz Palace	Slavkov u Brna	Wenzel Anton von Kaunitz
Czech Republic	Koleč zámek 1	Koleč Castle	Koleč	Ubelli family of Siegburg
Czech Republic	Zámek Budeničky, Budeničky 1, Budeničky (Šlapanice), okres Kladno	Budenice Castle	Budeničky	Matěj Ondřej Hartman
Czech Republic	Schloss Humprecht	Humprecht Château	Sobotka	Humprecht Jan Czernin
Czech Republic	Zámek Týnec u Klatov	New Castle at Týnec	Týnec	Maximilian Norbert Krakowski of Kolowrat
Czech Republic		Feldsberg Residence	Valtice	Karl Eusebius von Liechtenstein
Czech Republic	Vranov nad Dyji03(js) crop	Castle in Vranov nad Dyjí	Vranov nad Dyjí	
Czech Republic	Veltrusy zámek 2	Veltrusy Mansion	Veltrusy	Count Václav Antonín Chotek of Chotkov and Vojnín.
Czech Republic	Vraný, castle	Vraný Castle	Vraný	Metropolitan Chapter at St. Vitus Cathedral in Prague
Denmark		Bregentved	Faxe Municipality	Count Adam Gottlob Moltke
Denmark		Charlottenlund Palace	Charlottenlund	Princess Charlotte Amalie of Denmark
Denmark		Fredensborg Palace	Fredensborg	Frederick IV of Denmark
Denmark		Frederiksberg Palace	Frederiksberg	Frederick IV of Denmark
Denmark		Ledreborg	Lejre	Johan Ludvig Holstein-Ledreborg
Denmark		Eremitage Palace	Dyrehaven	Christian VI
Denmark		~~Hirschholm Palace~~ (demolished)	Hørsholm	Christian VI
Denmark		Amalienborg Palace	Copenhagen	Count Adam Gottlob Moltke
Estonia		Catherinethal Palace	Tallinn	Peter I of Russia
France	Chateau du Champ-de-Bataille entrance	Château du Champ de Bataille	Eure, Upper Normandy	Marquis de Marines
France		Château de Maisons	Maisons-Laffitte, Yvelines	René de Longueil
France		Vaux-le-Vicomte	Maincy, Seine-et-Marne	Nicolas Fouquet
France		Château de Saverne	Saverne	Archbishops of Strasbourg
France		Palace of Versailles	Versailles, Yvelines	Louis XIV
France		Grand Trianon	Versailles	Louis XIV
France		Château de Champs-sur-Marne	Champs-sur-Marne, Seine-et-Marne	Charles Renouard de La Touanne
France		Château de Dampierre	Dampierre-en-Yvelines	Charles Honoré d'Albert, duc de Luynes
France		Château de Breteuil	Choisel	Le Tonnelier de Breteuil
France		Château de Champlâtreux	Épinay-Champlâtreux	Mathieu-François Molé
France		Château de Valençay	Valençay	Charles Legendre de Villemorien
France		Palais Rohan	Strasbourg	Armand Gaston Maximilien de Rohan
France		Hôtel de Soubise	Paris	François de Rohan-Soubise
France		Ducal Palace of Nancy (extension)	Nancy	Stanislas Leszczyński
France		Château de Lunéville	Lunéville	Leopold of Lorraine
France		Château de Commercy	Commercy	Charles Henri de Lorraine
France		Château d'Haroué	Haroué	Marc de Beauvau
Germany	Schloss Oraninenburg-01	Oranienburg Palace	Oranienburg	Louise Henriette of Orange-Nassau
Germany	Johannstorf 09 2021 04	Schloss Johannstorf, burnt down in 2025	Nordwestmecklenburg	
Germany	Schloss-Rossewitz-09-07-2008-110a	Herrenhaus Rossewitz	Mecklenburg-Western Pomerania	Joachim Heinrich von Vieregge
Germany	Jagdschloss Glienicke von Babelsberg aus Juli 2014 - panoramio	Jagdschloss Glienicke	Berlin	Frederick William of Brandenburg
Germany	Schloss-Friedenstein01	Friedenstein Palace	Gotha	Ernest I, Duke of Saxe-Gotha
Germany	Sögel - Clemenswerth - Zentralpavillon 05 ies	Schloss Clemenswerth	Sögel	Clemens August of Bavaria
Germany	Uklei Jagdschloss 1	Hunting Pavilion in Eutin	Eutin	Princess Ulrike Friederike Wilhelmine of Hesse-Kassel
Germany	Neschwitz Schlosspark Barockschloss 02	Baroque Palace Neschwitz	Lusatia	Frederick Louis of Württemberg-Winnental
Germany	Neschwitz Jagdpavillon 01	Baroque Pavilion Neschwitz	Lusatia	Frederick Louis of Württemberg-Winnental
Germany	Schloss Mosigkau 2022CF 01	Mosigkau Castle	Mosigkau	Princess Anna Wilhelmine of Anhalt-Dessau
Germany	Residenzschloss Froschperspektive	Arolsen Castle	Bad Arolsen	Friedrich Anton Ulrich, Prince of Waldeck and Pyrmont
Germany	SchloßImshausen	Schloss Imshausen	Imshausen	Rudolf von Trott zu Solz
Germany	Gut Wotersen Herrenhaus	Wotersen Castle	Roseburg	Andreas Gottlieb Freiherr von Bernstorff
Germany	2 Schloss Solitude (Stuttgart) Mitteltrakt der Südseite	Solitude Palace	Stuttgart	Charles Eugene, Duke of Württemberg
Germany	SchlossHohenheim pan-pjt1	Hohenheim Castle	Hohenheim	Charles Eugene, Duke of Württemberg
Germany	Plön Prinzenhaus	Princes' House	Plön	Friedrich Karl of Schleswig-Holstein-Plön
Germany	Goerlitz Neißstraße 30	Baroque House in Gorlitz	Gorlitz	Christian Ameiß
Germany	Coselpalais	Cosel Palace	Dresden	Count Friedrich August von Cosel
Germany	Hospital Dresden Friedrichstadt17	Brühl-Marcolini Palace	Dresden	Countess Ursula Katharina Lubomirska
Germany	Schloss Übigau 08 2012	Übigau Palace	Dresden	Elector August the Strong
Germany	Schloss Nickern	Nickern Palace	Dresden	Hans von Bose
Germany	Hof Wallbrunn Großwinternheim	Wallbrunn Court	Ingelheim am Rhein	
Germany		Münster Residence	Münster	Archduke Maximilian Francis of Austria
Germany	Erbdrostenhof, Münster (06871)	Erbdrostenhof	Münster	Adolf Heidenreich Baron Droste of Vischering
Germany	Schloss Bornheim Jan2012 02	Bornheim Castle	Bornheim	Baron Waldbott-Bassenheim
Germany	Heidelberg HausMeder1	Meder House	Heidelberg	Meder family
Germany	Palais Rivera (Erding) 5	Rivera Palace	Erding	Adelheid von Rivera
Germany		Poppelsdorf Palace	Bonn	Joseph Clemens, Archbishop-Elector of Cologne
Germany		Schloss Nordkirchen	Nordkirchen	Prince-bishops of Munster
Germany		Anholt Castle (rebuilt)	Isselburg	Princes of Salm-Salm
Germany		Gottorf Castle	Schleswig	Frederick IV, Duke of Holstein-Gottorp
Germany		Electoral Palace of Bonn	Bonn	Archbishop of Cologne
Germany		Schloss Weißenstein	Pommersfelden	Archbishop of Mainz and Prince Bishop of Bamberg (Lothar Franz von Schönborn)
Germany	Schloss Reichmannsdorf 01	Reichmannsdorf Castle	Reichmannsdorf, Schlüsselfeld	Archbishop of Mainz and Prince Bishop of Bamberg (Lothar Franz von Schönborn)
Germany	Schloss Löwenstein Mittelteil	Schloss Löwenstein	Kleinheubach	Prince Dominic Marquard of Löwenstein-Wertheim-Rochefort
Germany	Ullstadt Schloss 001	Schlossanlage Ullstadt	Sugenheim	Barons of Frankenstein
Germany		Mannheim Palace	Mannheim	Charles III Philip, Elector Palatine
Germany		Electoral Palace of Trier	Trier	Archbishop of Trier
Germany		Augustusburg and Falkenlust	Brühl	Archbishop of Cologne (Clemens August of Bavaria)
Germany		Schloss Benrath	Düsseldorf	Charles Theodore, Elector Palatine
Germany		Bothmer Castle	Klütz	Hans Caspar von Bothmer
Germany		Schloss Rastatt	Rastatt	Louis of Baden
Germany		Ludwigsburg Palace	Ludwigsburg	Eberhard Louis of Württemberg
Germany		Karlsruhe Palace	Karlsruhe	Charles III William, Margrave of Baden-Durlach
Germany		Stuttgart Residence (rebuilt)	Stuttgart	Charles Eugene of Württemberg
Germany		Schloss Altshausen	Altshausen	Teutonic Order
Germany		Schloss Favorite	Rastatt	Sibylle Auguste of Saxe-Lauenburg
Germany		Schloss Favorite	Ludwigsburg	Eberhard Louis of Württemberg
Germany		Castle Solitude	Stuttgart	Charles Eugene of Württemberg
Germany		Würzburg Residence	Würzburg	Johann Philipp Franz von Schönborn
Germany		Werneck Residence	Werneck	Friedrich Karl von Schönborn
Germany		Veitshöchheim Residence	Veitshöchheim	Peter Philipp von Dernbach
Germany		New Residence, Bamberg	Bamberg	Archbishop of Mainz and Prince Bishop of Bamberg (Lothar Franz von Schönborn)
Germany	Bamberg-Kapuzinerstr-18-Nr25-Rotenhan-Palais-2018-gje	Noble Palace Rotenhan	Bamberg	Barons of Rotenhan
Germany	Bamberg-Judenstrasse 14 von Nordosten-20131014	Böttingerhaus	Bamberg	Johann Ignaz Michael Tobias Böttinger
Germany	Wasserschloss-Villa-Concordia-P3100010	Villa Concordia	Bamberg	Johann Ignaz Michael Tobias Böttinger
Germany	Neuer Ebracher Hof	Neuer Ebracher Hof	Bamberg	Ebrach monastery
Germany	BibraHaus	Bibra Haus	Bamberg	Bibra Family
Germany	Seehof-Hauptseite	Schloss Seehof	Memmelsdorf, Bamberg	Marquard Sebastian Schenk von Stauffenberg, Prince-bishop of Bamberg
Germany	Böttinger Schlößchen	Böttinger Manor	Stegaurach	Johann Ignaz Michael Tobias Böttinger
Germany		Bruchsal Palace	Bruchsal	Damian Hugo Philipp von Schönborn
Germany		Schloss Erlangen	Erlangen	George William, Margrave of Brandenburg-Bayreuth
Germany		New Palace, Bayreuth	Bayreuth	Frederick, Margrave of Brandenburg-Bayreuth
Germany		Ellingen Palace	Ellingen	Teutonic Order
Germany		Dachau Palace	Dachau	House of Wittelsbach
Germany		Schleissheim Palace	Oberschleißheim	Maximilian II Emanuel
Germany		Lustheim Palace	Oberschleißheim	Maximilian II Emanuel
Germany		Nymphenburg Palace	Munich	House of Wittelsbach
Germany		Amalienburg	Munich	Maria Amalia, Holy Roman Empress
Germany		Fürstenried Palace	Munich	Maximilian II Emanuel
Germany	Palais Holnstein Munich	Holnstein Palace	Munich	Sophie Caroline von Ingenheim, Countess Holnstein
Germany	Palais Porcia Muenchen	Palais Porcia	Munich	Count Fugger
Germany	Palais Preysing Muenchen Ostseite-1	Palais Preysing	Munich	Count Johann Maximilian of Preysing-Hohenaschau
Germany	Asamhaus	Asamhaus	Munich	Asam brothers
Germany		Charlottenburg Palace	Charlottenburg, Berlin	Frederick I of Prussia
Germany		Berlin Palace (rebuilt)	Berlin	Frederick I of Prussia
Germany		New Palace	Potsdam	Frederick II of Prussia
Germany		Sanssouci	Potsdam	Frederick II of Prussia
Germany		Palast Barberini (rebuilt)	Potsdam	Frederick II of Prussia
Germany		Stadtschloss, Potsdam (rebuilt)	Potsdam	Frederick William, Elector of Brandenburg
Germany		Schloss Meseberg	Gransee	Hermann von Wartensleben
Germany		Dresden Castle (rebuilt)	Dresden	Augustus II the Strong
Germany		Japanese Palace (rebuilt)	Dresden	Augustus II the Strong
Germany		Sommerpalais in Great Garden (rebuilt)	Dresden	John George III
Germany	DD-Jüdenhof-11-2	Dinglingerhaus	Dresden	Georg Christoph Dinglinger
Germany	Dresden Kurländer Palais	Courland Palace	Dresden	Count August Christoph of Wackerbarth
Germany		Moritzburg Castle	Moritzburg	Augustus II the Strong
Germany		Hubertusburg	Wermsdorf	Augustus II the Strong
Germany		Nischwitz Palace	Thallwitz, Saxony	Heinrich von Brühl
Germany		Rammenau Castle	Rammenau, Saxony	Ernst Ferdinand von Knoch
Germany		Zwinger (rebuilt)	Dresden	Augustus II the Strong
Germany		Schloss Oranienbaum	Oranienbaum, Germany	Henriette Catherine of Nassau
Germany		Pillnitz Castle	Pillnitz	Augustus II the Strong
Germany		Fasanenschlösslein	Moritzburg	Frederick Augustus I of Saxony
Germany		Schloss Belvedere	Weimar	Ernest August of Saxe-Weimar
Germany		Schloss Wilhelmsthal	Calden	William VIII of Hesse-Kassel
Germany	Delitzsch - Schloss Delitzsch - 20130711213600	Schloss Delitzsch (after renovations)	Delitzsch	Dukes of Saxe-Mersenburg
Germany	Neues Schloss Meersburg (Panorama)	Neues Schloss (Meersburg)	Meersburg	Johann Franz II. von Stauffenber
Germany	Fulda, Rittergasse 4, 2019-10 CN-01	Johann Dientzenhofer's house	Fulda	Johann Dientzenhofer
Germany	Licht und Schatten Schloss Fasanerie Eichenzell Juni 2012	Schloss Fasanerie	Fulda	Adalbert von Schleifras
Germany	Stadtschloss Fulda (Südwestansicht)	Fulda City Palace	Fulda	Fulda Prince-Abbots
Germany	Schloss Bieberstein2	Schloss Bieberstein	Fulda	Fulda Prince-Abbots
Germany	Schloss Geisa2	Schloss Geisa	Fulda	Fulda Prince-Abbots
Germany	Knetzgau Schloss Oberschwappach	Schloss Oberschwappach	Knetzgau	Abbot Wilhelm I Sölner
Germany	Schloss Osnabrück Frontalansicht von der Straße. Universität Osnabrück. UOS. Foto Clemens Ratte-Polle. 2015.05.06.DSC05833	Schloss Osnabrück	Osnabrück	Ernest Augustus, Elector of Hanover
Germany	Aachen, Couven-Museum, 2011-07 CN-01	Monheim House	Aachen	Monheim pharmacist family
Germany	SchlossSchoenauFront	Schönau Castle (Aachen)	Aachen	Johann Gottfried von Blanche
Germany	Monschau Rotes Haus 2014 08 22	Red House (Monschau)	Monschau	Johann Heinrich Scheibler (Textile Manufacturer, 1705)
Germany	Monschau Stadtstraße 1 - 3	Pauls'sches Haus	Monschau	Paul Christoph Scheibler
Germany	Schloss Jaegerhof in Duesseldorf-Pempelfort, von Westen	Schloss Jägerhof	Düsseldorf-Pempelfort	Charles Theodore, Elector of Bavaria
Germany	Wiesbaden-biebrich-schloss	Schloss Biebrich	Wiesbaden, Hesse	George Augustus Samuel of Nassau-Idstein
Germany	Mainz Osteiner Hof BW 2012-08-18 16-39-22	Osteiner Hof	Mainz	Franz Wolfgang Damian of Ostein
Germany	Mainz Bassenheimer Hof	Bassenheimer Hof	Mainz	Johann Friedrich Karl of Ostein
Germany	Mainz Deutschhaus Landtag-RP 234+37-vzLR	German House Mainz	Mainz	Franz Ludwig von Pfalz-Neuburg, Archbishop of Mainz and Grand Master of the Teutonic Order
Germany	Stadioner Hof	Stadioner Hof	Mainz	von Rollingen
Germany	Stadionsches Schloss	Ludwigsburg	Count Anton Heinrich Friedrich von Stadion	
Germany	Rüdesheim Schloss Groenesteyn 145 Oberstrasse19	Schloss Groenesteyn	Rüdesheim am Rhein, Hesse	Anselm Franz von Ritter zu Groenesteyn
Germany	Saalfeld Schloßstraße 24 Schloss - Bestandteil Sachgesamtheit "Schloss und Park Saalfeld-Saale"	Schloss Saalfeld	Saalfeld	Duke John Ernest IV
Germany	Heidecksburg	Heidecksburg	Rudolstadt	Princes of Schwarzburg-Rudolstadt
Germany	Der Innenhof des Schlosses Schwarzburg um 1890	Schloss Schwarzburg	Saalfeld-Rudolstadt	Schwarzburg-Rudolstadt family
Germany	Aerial image of the Ettlingen Palace (view from the southwest)	Ettlingen Palace	Ettlingen	Margravine Augusta Sibylla
Germany	Wickrath Westflügel	Schloss Wickrath	Wickrath	count Wilhelm Otto Friedrich von Quadt.
Germany	Schloss Beck	Schloss Beck	Bottrop	
Germany	Zweibrücken castle front April 2010 darker	Zweibrücken Castle	Zweibrücken	Gustav, Duke of Zweibrücken.
Hungary		Buda Castle	Budapest	Maria Theresa
Hungary		Gödöllő Palace	Gödöllő	Antal I. Grassalkovich
Hungary		Archiepiscopal Palace	Kalocsa	Ádám Patachich
Hungary		Savoy Castle, Ráckeve	Ráckeve	Prince Eugene of Savoy
Hungary		Eszterháza	Fertőd	Prince Nikolaus Esterházy "the Magnificent"
Hungary		Esterházy Mansion	Pápa	Ferenc Esterházy
Hungary		Episcopal Palace	Veszprém	Ignác Koller
Hungary		Festetics Palace	Keszthely	Kristóf Festetics
Hungary		L'Huillier-Coburg Palace	Edelény	Ferenc János L'Huillier
Hungary		Zsira Palace	Zsira	Antal Rimanóczy
Hungary		Episcopal Palace	Szombathely	János Szily
Hungary	Ráday-kastély (7216. számú műemlék) 2	Ráday Castle	Pécel	Ráday family
Hungary		Esterházy Palace	Csákvár	János Esterházy
India	Dilkusha6	Dilkusha Kothi (in ruin by 1880s)	Lucknow	Saadat Ali Khan II, 6th Nawab of Oudh
Italy	Pontifical Palace (Castel Gandolfo)	Palace of Castel Gandolfo	Castel Gandolfo	Pope Urban VIII
Italy		Palazzo Filangeri-Cutò, Santa Margherita di Belice	Santa Margherita di Belice	Corbera family
Italy	Villa Barberini streetside view I 20141006	Villa Barberini	Castel Gandolfo	Pope Urban VIII
Italy	Palazzo Caroelli	Palazzo Caroelli	Garbagna Novarese, Piedmont	Caroelli family
Italy		Palazzina di Stupinigi	Stupinigi	Victor Amadeus II of Sardinia
Italy		Royal Palace of Turin	Turin	Victor Amadeus II
Italy		Palazzo Carignano	Turin	Emmanuel-Philibert of Savoy-Carignan
Italy		Castello del Valentino	Turin	Emmanuel Philibert of Savoy
Italy		Palazzo Madama, Turin (extension)	Turin	Marie Jeanne Baptiste de Savoie-Nemours
Italy		Palace of Venaria	Venaria Reale	Charles Emmanuel II of Savoy
Italy		Ducal Palace of Modena	Modena	Francesco I d'Este, Duke of Modena
Italy		Ducal Palace of Colorno	Colorno	Francesco Farnese, Duke of Parma
Italy		Palazzo Estense	Varese	Francesco III d'Este
Italy		Villa Pisani	Stra	Alvise Pisani
Italy		Palazzo Stefano Balbi	Genoa	Balbi family
Italy		Royal Palace of Naples (rebuilt)	Naples	Charles VII of Naples
Italy		Palace of Capodimonte	Naples	Charles VII
Italy		Palace of Portici	Portici	Charles VII
Italy		Ducal Palace of Sassuolo	Sassuolo	House of Este
Italy		Palazzo Belloni Battagia	Venice	Belloni family
Italy	Ca' Rezzonico (Venice)	Ca' Rezzonico	Venice	Giambattista Rezzonico
Italy	Ca'Pesaro di Baldassarre Longhena facciata sul Canal Grande	Ca' Pesaro	Venice	Pesaro family
Italy	Palazzo Erizzo a San Martino (Venice)	Palazzo Erizzo a San Martino, Venice	Venice	Erizzo family
Italy	Palazzo Gradenigo (Venice)	Palazzo Gradenigo	Venice	Gradenigo family
Italy	Palazzo Michiel dalle Colonne	Palazzo Michiel dalle Colonne, Venice	Venice	Zen dalle Colonne family
Italy	(Venice) Palazzo Emo alla Maddalena - Facade on Canal Grande	Palazzo Emo at Maddalena	Venice	Emo Family
Italy	Varese - Villa Recalcati 0474	Villa Recalcati	Varese	Marquis Milanese Gabrio Recalcati
Italy		Palace of Caserta (the largest building in 18th-century Europe)	Caserta	Charles VII
Italy	Palazzo Biscari, Catania 2022	Palazzo Biscari	Catania	Ignazio Paternò Castello, 3rd Prince of Biscari
Italy	Villa Palagonia (3)	Villa Palagonia	Bagheria	Don Ferdinando Gravina, 5th Prince of Palagonia
Italy	Museo Guttuso	Villa Cattolica	Bagheria	Francesco Bonanno, Prince of Cattolica Eraclea
Italy	Villa mansi	Villa Mansi, Segromigno in Monte	Capannori	Mansi Family
Italy	Villa Torrigiani di Lucca 01	Villa Torrigiani (additions at the end of the 17th century)	Capannori	Nicola Santini
Italy	Orio Litta - Villa Litta	Villa Litta Carini	Orio Litta	Antonio Cavazzi della Somaglia, 8th Count of Somaglia
Italy	Milano - Palazzo Clerici - Facciata	Palazzo Clerici	Milan	Anton Giorgio Clerici
Italy	20171119 Palazzo Litta, lato	Palazzo Litta	Milan	Bartolomeo Arese
Italy	Villa Widmann	Villa Widmann	Mira	Sceriman
Italy	Villa sorra 04	Villa Sorra	Castelfranco Emilia	Antonio Sorra
Italy	15BrugherioVillaSormani	Villa Sormani	Brugherio	Count Charles Joseph Bolagnos
Italy	VillaArconatiCastellazzo	Villa Arconati, Bollate	Bollate	Galeazzo Arconati
Italy	VillaArvediGrezzana	Villa Arvedi	Grezzana	Allegri family
Italy	Villa Contarini 2	Villa Contarini	Padua	Paolo and Francesco Contarini
Italy	Villa Dosi - panoramio	Villa Dosi Delfini	Tuscany	Dosi Delfini family
Italy	Villa di Geggiano, esterno 01	Villa di Geggiano	Tuscany	Bianchi Bandinelli family
Italy	Villa cetinale, 5	Villa Cetinale	Tuscany	Flavio Chigi
Italy	Pgr Pesaro - Villa Caprile	Villa Caprile, Pesaro	Pesaro	Marquis Giovanni Mosca
Italy	Villa Litta facade	Villa Litta (Milan)	Milan	Marquis Corbella
Italy	Lodi - palazzo Modignani-Pitoletti	Palazzo Modignani	Lodi	Giovan Battista Modignani
Italy	Trieste Palazzo Pitteri	Palazzo Pitteri	Trieste	Dominic Plenario
Italy	Villa Lattes, fronte principale	Villa Lattes	Istrana, Veneto	Paolo Tamagnino
Italy	Palazzo Gagliardi Sardi	Palazzo Gagliardi Sardi	L'Aquila, Abruzzo	Gagliardi and Sardi families
Italy	Villa-Tiepolo-Passi	Villa Tiepolo Passi	Carbonera, Veneto Almorò Tiepolo	
Italy	Frascati 2 BW	Villa Aldobrandini	Frascati, Lazio	Cardinal Pietro Aldobrandini
Italy	Italy 2011 day 2 (89), Villa Filangeri, Santa Flavia, Italy	Villa Filangeri	Santa Flavia, Palermo	Prince Pietro Filangeri
Italy	Palazzo Natoli	Palazzo Natoli	Palermo	Marquis Vincenzo Natoli
Italy	Palais Durini - Milan (IT25) - 2022-09-02 - 2	Palazzo Durini Caproni	Milan	Don Giovan Battista Durini, Count of Monza
Italy	Villa Alliata Cardillo	Villa Alliata Cardillo	Palermo	Marquis Domenico Cardillo
Italy	Palermo-AP-p1070469	Palazzo Alliata di Villafranca	Palermo	Alliata family
Italy	Palazzo Butera facciata	Palazzo Butera, Palermo	Palermo	Prince Ercole Michele Branciforte
Italy	Villa La Tesoriera Torino	Villa La Tesoriera	Turin, Piedmont	Aymo Ferrero from Cocconato
Italy	Trastevere v Orti d'Alibert la palazzina P1000248	Villa Alibert	Trastevere, Roma, Lazio	Count Giacomo d'Alibert
Italy	San Vendemiano - Villa Lippomano - Foto di Paolo Steffan	Villa Lippomano Querini Stampalia Dall'Armi Valeri Manera Maschio	San Vendemiano, Veneto	Lippomano Family
Italy	Villa Pratola - Santo Stefano di Magra Foto 1	Villa Pratola	Santo Stefano di Magra, Liguria	Marquis Remedi di Sarzana's Family
Italy	Villa Patrizi	Villa Patrizi (Naples)	Naples	Pietro Patrizi, Marquis of Ripacandida and Royal Councillor
Italy	Villa de Mari Acquaviva delle Fonti	Villa de Mari (Acquaviva delle Fonti)	Acquaviva delle Fonti, Puglia	Carlo I de Mari
Italy	Villa Corsini 2	Villa Corsini in Castello	Florence, Tuscany	Rinieri Family
Italy	Villa Crivelli Mesmer	Villa Crivelli Mesmer	Monza, Lombardy	Mesmer family
Italy	Villa Grifoni Castel Gabbiano Cremona	Villa Griffoni Sant'Angelo	Castel Gabbiano	Count Griffoni of Sant'Angelo in Vado (Urbino)
Italy	Villa Bellavista	Villa Bellavista	Village in Buggiano, Tuscany	Francesco Feroni
Italy	Villa fanini	Villa Fanini	Capannori, Tuscany	Arnolfini family
Italy	Palazzo Lanfranchi Matera	Palazzo Lanfranchi	Matera, Basilicata	Vincenzo Lanfranchi
Italy	Villa di Montebolone	Villa of Montebolone	Via Montebolone, Pavia, Lombardy	Somascans
Italy	Palazzo Malvinni Malvezzi (Matera)	Palazzo Malvinni Malvezzi	Matera, Basilicata	Erennio di Giovanni Malevindi
Italy	Villa Brignole Sale, foto di Paolo Monti	Villa Brignole Sale	Genoa, Liguria	Brignole-Sale family
Italy	Palazzo Comitini	Palazzo Comitini	Palermo	Michele Gravina Cruillas, Prince of Comitini
Italy	Catania - Piazza dell'Università 01 - Palazzo San Giuliano	Palazzo San Giuliano, Catania	Catania	Orazio Paternò Castello and Asmundo, Marquis of San Giuliano
Italy	Catania, Palazzo Manganelli - panoramio	Palazzo Manganelli, Catania	Catania	Antonio Paternò, 6th Baron of Manganelli
Italy	Caserta, Palazzo Paternò	Paternò Palace (Caserta)	Caserta	Paternò family
Italy	Palazzo asmundo	Palazzo Asmundo, Palermo	Palermo	Giuseppe Asmundo, Presidente di Giustizia and Marquess of Sessa
Italy	Villa Manin in Passariano	Villa Manin	Codroipo	Lodovico Manin, Doge of Venice
Italy	Palazzo Valguarnera-Gangi	Palazzo Valguarnera-Gangi	Palermo	Prince Peter of Valguarnera
Latvia		Jelgava Palace	Jelgava	Ernst Johann von Biron
Latvia		Rundāle Palace	Pilsrundāle	Ernst Johann von Biron
Latvia	Reiterna nams01	Reitern House	Riga	Johann Reitern
Malta		Hostel de Verdelin	Valletta	Jean-Jacques de Verdelin
Malta		Palazzo Vilhena	Mdina	António Manoel de Vilhena
Malta		Casa Leoni	Santa Venera	António Manoel de Vilhena
Malta		Villa Bologna	Attard	Count Nicholas Perdicomati Bologna
Malta		Selmun Palace	Mellieħa	Monte della Redenzione degli Schiavi
Mexico		National Palace	Mexico City	Hernán Cortés
Mexico		Casa de Alfeñique	Puebla de Zaragoza, Puebla	Antonio de Santa María Incháurregui
Mexico		Palacio del Arzobispado	Mexico City	Juan de Zumárraga
Mexico		Casa de los Azulejos	Mexico City	Luis de Vivero e Ircio
Mexico		Casa de las Bóvedas	Puebla de Zaragoza, Puebla	Diego Peláez
Mexico		Palace of the Counts of San Mateo de Valparaíso	Mexico City	Miguel de Berrio y Zaldívar Guerrero y Torres
Mexico		Palace of the Inquisition	Mexico City	Martín de Valencia
Mexico		Palace of Iturbide	Mexico City	Fernando de la Campa y Cos
Mexico		Casas del Mayorazgo de Guerrero	Mexico City	Juan Guerrero de Luna
Mexico		Palace of the Marquise of Villar del Águila	Santiago de Querétaro, Querétaro	Paula Dávila Moctezuma y Fernández del Corral
Mexico		Casa de los Muñecos	Puebla de Zaragoza, Puebla	Juan Ochoa de Elejalde
Mexico		Palacio del Obispado	Monterrey, Nuevo León	Rafael José Verger
Mexico		Palacio de Zambrano	Victoria de Durango, Durango	Juan José Zambrano
Mexico		Casa del Mayorazgo de la Canal	San Miguel de Allende, Guanajuato	Manuel de la Canal y Bueno de Baeza
Mexico		Casa de Allende	San Miguel de Allende, Guanajuato Domingo Narciso de Allende y Ayerdi	
Netherlands		Het Loo Palace	Apeldoorn	William and Mary
Netherlands		Binnenhof	The Hague	Floris IV, Count of Holland
Netherlands		Royal Palace of Amsterdam	Amsterdam	Louis Bonaparte
Netherlands		Huis ten Bosch	The Hague	Willem-Alexander of the Netherlands
Netherlands		Mauritshuis	The Hague	John Maurice, Prince of Nassau-Siegen
Netherlands		Noordeinde Palace	The Hague	Frederick Henry, Prince of Orange
Netherlands		Catshuis	The Hague	Prime Minister of the Netherlands
Netherlands		Trompenburgh	The Hague	Cornelis Tromp
Netherlands		Drakensteyn Castle	Lage Vuursche	Beatrix of the Netherlands
Netherlands		Slot Zeist	Zeist	Willem Adriaan van Nassau
Netherlands		Hartekamp	Heemstede	George Clifford III and Carl Linnaeus
Netherlands		Huis Doorn	Doorn	Wilhelm II
Netherlands		Amerongen Castle	Amerongen	Wilhelm II
Netherlands		Trippenhuis	Amsterdam	Jacob Trip
Netherlands		Kasteel Vaeshartelt	Maastricht	William II of the Netherlands
Netherlands		Château Neercanne	Maastricht	Daniël van Dopff
Netherlands		Generaalshuis	Maastricht	Bernardus Johannes Cornelis Dibbets
Netherlands	Aanzicht Huis Huguetan, Lange Voorhout 34 (2019) img. 05	House Huguetan	The Hague	Adriana Margaretha Huguetan
Netherlands	Centrum @ The Hague (20582885711)	Kneuterdijk Palace	The Hague	Count Johan Hendrik of Wassenaer-Obdam
Netherlands	Huis Schuylenburch 2 Den Haag	House Schuylenburch	The Hague	Cornelis van Schuylenburch
Netherlands	2010-01-09 kabinet van de koningin den haag	House of Peacock	The Hague	Reinier Pauw and Stijntje van Ruytenburch
Netherlands	Het Spaansche Hof - img. 09	The Spanish Court	The Hague	
Netherlands	Escher Museum	Lange Voorhout Palace	The Hague	Anthony Patras, deputy of Friesland and mayor of Sloten
Netherlands	RM1651 Herengracht 475	House De Neufville	Amsterdam	Mattheus de Neufville and Petronella van Lennep de Neufville
Netherlands	Amsterdam - Nieuwe Keizersgracht 28	Van Brants-Rushofje	Amsterdam	Christoffel Brants
Netherlands	Huis De Vicq (voorgevel)	House De Vicq	Amsterdam	Dr. Frans de Vicq
Netherlands	Frederiksplein 10, voorgevel - Amsterdam - 20016794 - RCE	Fredriksplein 10	Amsterdam	
Netherlands	Willet-holthuysen	Willet-Holthuysen House	Amsterdam	Jacob Hop
Netherlands	Huis v Brienen Voorgevel Herengracht 284	House van Brienen	Amsterdam	Arnoldus Johannes van Brienen
Netherlands	Amsterdam - Keizersgracht 317	De Wildeman	Amsterdam	Christoffel Brants
Netherlands	Amsterdam - Singel 390	Bouwkonst	Amsterdam	Anthonie van Wijngaarden
Netherlands	Eefde, De Voorst hoofdgebouw RM528999 (6)	De Voorst	Gelderland	Arnold Joost van Keppel
Netherlands	Delft - Oude Delft 73	Oude Delft 73	Delft	
Netherlands	Langestraat 114, Alkmaar	House De Dieu	Alkmaar	Carel de Dieu
Netherlands	Overzicht van de voorgevel met voorplein, toegangshek met pijlers op de voorgrond - Obbicht - 20408579 - RCE	Obbicht House	Obbicht	Antoine Guillaume de Paludé
Netherlands	Kasteel Vaalsbroek	Vaalsbroek Castle	Vaals	Van Eys Family
Norway	Damsgaard.hoved	Damsgård Manor	Laksevåg	Joachim Christian Geelmuyden Gyldenkrantz
Norway	Stiftsgaarden Trondheim	Stiftsgården	Trondheim	Cecilie Christine Schøller
Poland	Zamek Królewski w Warszawie od strony Wisły 2021	Royal Castle (rebuilt after destruction)	Warsaw	Augustus III of Poland
Poland		Copper-Roof Palace (rebuilt after destruction)	Warsaw	Jerzy Dominik Lubomirski
Poland		Wilanów Palace	Wilanów, Warsaw	John III Sobieski
Poland		Branicki Palace (rebuilt after destruction)	Warsaw	Jan Klemens Branicki
Poland		Krasiński Palace (rebuilt after destruction)	Warsaw	Jan Dobrogost Krasiński
Poland		Ostrogski Palace (rebuilt after destruction)	Warsaw	Jan Gniński
Poland		Palace of Bishops of Kraków (rebuilt after destruction)	Warsaw	Kajetan Sołtyk
Poland		Książ Castle	Książ	Conrad Ernest Maximilian von Hochberg
Poland		Łańcut Castle (remodeled)	Łańcut	Stanisław Lubomirski
Poland		Abbot's Palace (Oliwa)	Oliwa	Jacek Rybiński
Poland		Lanckoroński Palace	Kurozwęki	Stanisław Lanckoroński
Poland	Pałac w Rogalinie (1)	Rogalin Palace	Rogalin	Kazimierz Raczyński
Poland		Branicki Palace (rebuilt after destruction)	Białystok	Jan Klemens Branicki
Poland	Białystok pałacyk gościnny Branickich	The Branicki Guest Palace in Białystok	Białystok	Jan Sękowski
Poland	Biskupice Podgorne - palac XIXw 2	Palace in Biskupice Podgórne	Biskupice Podgórne	
Poland		Bieliński Palace	Otwock Wielki	Kazimierz Ludwik Bieliński
Poland		Bishop's Palace in Ciążeń	Ciążeń	Teodor Kazimierz Czartoryski
Poland		Nieborów Palace	Nieborów	Michał Stefan Radziejowski
Poland		Radzyń Podlaski Castle	Radzyń Podlaski	Eustachy Potocki
Poland	Pałac Potockich w Warszawie 2021	Potocki Palace	Warsaw	Denhoff family
Poland		Mostowski Old Palace	Ostromecko	Paweł Michał Mostowski
Poland		Branicki Summer Palace	Choroszcz	Jan Klemens Branicki
Poland		Palace in Chróstnik	Chróstnik	Georg Karl von Haugwitz
Poland		Zamoyski Palace	Kozłówka	Michał Bieliński
Poland	Kujawy palace	Kujau Palace	Wrocław	
Poland		The Palace of the Bishops of Kujawy in Wolbórz	Wolbórz	Antoni Kazimierz Ostrowski
Poland		Wrocław Palace	Wrocław	Heinrich Gottfried von Spätgen
Poland		Rydzyna Castle	Rydzyna	Aleksander Józef Sułkowski
Poland		Radomierzyce Palace	Radomierzyce	Joachim Sigismund von Ziegler und Klipphausen
Poland		Palace in Piotrkowice	Piotrkowice	von Maltzan
Poland		The palace in Warmątowice Sienkiewiczowskie	Warmątowice	
Poland		Palace in Chocianów	Chocianów	Melchior Gottlob von Reden
Poland		Sanguszko Palace	Lubartów	Paweł Karol Sanguszko
Poland		Dembiński Palace in Szczekociny	Szczekociny	Franciszek Dembiński and Urszula Morsztyn
Poland	Kamienica Gdańsk, ul. Długa 12 by AW	Uphagen's House	Gdańsk	Johann Uphagen
Poland	Puławy, Pałac Czartoryskich (02)	Czartoryski Palace (Puławy)	Pulawy	Prince Stanisław Herakliusz Lubomirski
Poland	Poland-00580 - Działyński Palace (29733493963)	Działyński Palace	Poznań	Władysław Roch Gurowski, Grand Marshal of Lithuania
Poland	Pałac Przebendowskich Radziwiłłów w Warszawie elewacja zachodnia	Przebendowski Palace	Warsaw	Jan Jerzy Przebendowski
Poland	Kurozwęki Castle 20230719 01	Kurozwęki Palace	Kurozwęki	Maciej Sołtyk
Poland	Sapieha Palace (1)	Sapieha Palace, Warsaw	Warsaw	Stanislaw Morsztyn
Poland	Pałac Symonowiczów w Warszawie 2017	Symonowicz Palace	Warsaw	Simon de Symonowicz
Poland	Kamienica przy ul Nowy Świat 51 w Warszawie 2021	Sangushki Palace (Warsaw)	Warsaw	Sanguszko Family
Poland	Pałac Małachowskich w Warszawie 2020	Małachowski Palace in Warsaw	Warsaw	Józef Benedykt Loupia
Poland	Lubartów, pałac Sanguszków (w kwiatach)	Sanguszko Palace	Lubartów	Sanguszko Family
Poland	Wrocław Rynek 4 sm	The Tenement House Under the Golden Eagle	Wroclaw	A.H. Gross
Poland		Star Tenement	Toruń	Jan Jerzy Zöbner,
Poland	Wrocław, Rynek 38 (01)	The Tenement House Under the Golden Anchor	Wroclaw	Johann Sigismund Cämmerer
Poland	Wrocław Malarska 30 sm	The Artzats' Tenement House in Wroclaw	Wroclaw	The Artzat Family (Disputed)
Poland	2016 Wrocław, Rynek 42	The Tenement House Under the Golden Trinity in Wrocław	Wroclaw	Andreas Forni
Poland	Wrocław Kuźnicza 12 sm	The Tenement House Under the Silver Helmet in Wroclaw	Wroclaw	Martin Maximilian von Knobelsdorf
Poland	Wrocław Plac Solny 20 Rynek 12 sm	Freier's Ecke	Wroclaw	Johann Freyer
Poland	MOs810 WG 23 2016 (Zaglebiowskie Zakamarki) (Kamienica Kaluzy, Bielsko) (2)	Kałuża's Tenement House	Wroclaw	Jan Bartelmuss
Poland	PalacKraskow	Palace in Krasków	Krasków	David Siegismund, Count of Hochberg on Rohnstock
Poland	Palace in Popowo Stare (73788041)	Palace in Popowo Stare	Popowo Stare	Ignacy Szołdrski
Poland	Dukla, zespół pałacowy (HB1)	Dukla Palace	Dukla	
Poland	Pałac w Minkowskiem.	Minkowsky Castle	Opole Voivodeship	Friedrich Wilhelm von Seydlitz
Portugal	Q88661492	Casa do Carmo	Guimarães	Counts of Margaride
Portugal	Palácio do Correio-Mor de Loures	Palace of Correio-Mor	Loures	Postmaster Generals of Portugal
Portugal	Palácio Fonte Monumental, Santo Antão do Tojal 02	Mitra Palace	Loures	D. Tomás de Almeida, 1st Patriarch of Lisbon
Portugal	Casa dos Lobos Machados, Guimarães	Casa dos Lobos Machados	Guimarães	
Portugal	Casa da Ínsua 13	House of Insua	Penalva do Castelo	Luís de Albuquerque de Melo Pereira e Cáceres
Portugal	Solar do Paço Episcopal - Trevões - Portugal (30469236290)	Episcopal Palace of Trevões	Trevões	Bishop D. Manuel de Vasconcelos Pereira
Portugal	Casa de Bonjoia-1	Bonjoia House	Campanhã	D. Lourenço de Amorim da Gama Lobo
Portugal	Palácio dos Condes de Anadia078	Palace of the Counts of Anadia	Viseu	Simão Pais do Amaral
Portugal	Casa Despacho Ordem S Francisco (Porto)	House of Dispatch of the Third Order of Saint Francis	Porto	
Portugal	Casa de Ramalde 00	House of Ramalde	Porto	D. Florência Leite Pereira de Melo
Portugal	Quinta S Gens (Matosinhos)	House of São Gens	Porto	
Portugal	Capela da Casa das Malheiras (fachada)	Malheiras Chapel House	Viana do Castelo	Friar D. António do Desterro Malheiro Reimão
Portugal	Madeira em Abril de 2011 IMG 1917 (5664429892)	Carvalhal Esmeraldo Palace	Funchal	Carvalhal Esmeraldo family
Portugal	Palacete de Belomonte (detalhe entrada)	Palacete de Belomonte	Porto	
Portugal	Portugal (15436280610)	Palacete of the Visconts of Balsemão	Porto	José Alvo Brandão
Portugal	Palácio de Reriz	Reriz Palace	São Pedro do Sul	Diogo Francisco de Almeida de Azevedo e Vasconcelos, Lord of Quinta do Testament in Reriz
Portugal	Universidade Autónoma de Lisboa	Palace of the Counts of Redondo	Lisbon	Counts of Redondo
Portugal	Casa e Museu dos Biscainhos (7)	Residence of Biscainhos	Braga	Dr. Constantino Ribeiro do Lago
Portugal		Belém National Palace	Lisbon, Estremadura	King João V of Portugal
Portugal		Bemposta Palace	Lisbon, Estremadura	Catherine of Braganza
Portugal		Braga Episcopal Palace	Braga, Minho	Rodrigo de Moura Teles
Portugal	Brejoeira	Brejoeira Palace	Monção	Luis Pereira Velho de Moscoso
Portugal		Burnay Palace	Lisbon, Estremadura	Vasco César de Meneses
Portugal		Estoi Palace	Estoi, Algarve	Francisco de Pereira Coutinho
Portugal		Foz Palace	Lisbon, Estremadura	José de Castelo Melhor
Portugal		Freixo Palace	Porto, Douro Litoral	Jerónimo de Távora e Noronha
Portugal		Mafra National Palace	Mafra, Estremadura	King João V of Portugal
Portugal		Mateus Palace	Vila Real, Trás-os-Montes e Alto Douro	António José Botelho Mourão
Portugal		Necessidades Palace	Lisbon, Estremadura	King João V of Portugal
Portugal		Laranjeiras Palace	Lisbon, Estremadura	Joaquim Pedro Quintela, 1st Count of Farrobo
Portugal		Janelas Verdes Palace	Lisbon, Estremadura	Francisco de Távora, 1st Count of Alvor
Portugal		Palace of the Dukes of Palmela	Lisbon, Estremadura	Pedro de Sousa Holstein, 1st Duke of Palmela
Portugal		Palaces of the Marquis of Pombal	Oeiras, Estremadura	Sebastião José de Carvalho e Melo, 1st Marquis of Pombal
Portugal		Porto Episcopal Palace	Porto, Douro Litoral	João Rafael de Mendonça
Portugal		Pinhel Episcopal Palace	Pinhel, Beira Alta	José de António Pinto de Mendonça Arrais
Portugal		Queluz National Palace	Queluz, Estremadura	King Peter III of Portugal
Portugal		Quintela Palace	Lisbon, Estremadura	Joaquim Pedro Quintela, 1st Baron of Quintela
Portugal		Raio Palace	Braga, Minho	João Duarte de Faria
Portugal		São João Novo Palace	Porto, Douro Litoral	Pedro Costa Lima
Portugal	Salazares Palace	Lousã, Beira Litoral	Maria da Piedade de Mello Sampaio Salazar	
Portugal		Távora Palace	Mirandela, Trás-os-Montes	Manuel Carlos da Cunha e Távora
Romania		Episcopal Palace	Oradea	Ádám Patachich
Romania		Bánffy Palace	Cluj-Napoca	György Bánffy
Romania		Brukenthal Palace	Sibiu	Samuel von Brukenthal
Romania	Gornesti Castelul	Teleki Castle in Gornești	Gorneşti	
Russia	Дом А.И.Троекурова	Troekurov's House	Saint Petersburg	Alexey Troekurov
Russia		Peterhof Palace	Peterhof	Peter I of Russia
Russia		Catherine Palace	Pushkin	Empress Elisabeth
Russia		Oranienbaum Palace	Lomonosov	Alexander Menshikov
Russia		Beloselsky-Belozersky Palace	Saint Petersburg	Prince Mikhail Andreevitch Belosselsky
Russia		Strelna Palace	Strelna	Peter I of Russia
Russia		Vorontsov Palace	Saint Petersburg	Mikhail Illarionovich Vorontsov
Russia		Summer Palace of Peter the Great	Saint Petersburg	Peter I of Russia
Russia		Kikin Palace	Saint Petersburg	Alexander Kikin
Russia		Shuvalov Mansion	Saint Petersburg	Ivan Shuvalov
Russia		Chinese Palace in Oranienbaum	Lomonosov	Catherine II of Russia
Russia		Catherine Palace	Moscow	Catherine II of Russia
Russia		Winter Palace	Saint Petersburg	Empress Elisabeth
Russia		Menshikov Palace	Saint Petersburg	Alexander Menshikov
Russia		Stroganov Palace	Saint Petersburg	Stroganov family
Russia	Palace of Elizaveta Petrovna - Moscow, Russia - panoramio	The country palace of Elizabeth Petrovna	Moscow	Elizaveta Petrovna
Russia	Moscow 05-2017 img20 Lefortovo Palace	Lefortovo Palace	Moscow	Admiral Franz Lefort
Russia		Sheremetev Palace	Saint Petersburg	Pyotr Sheremetev
Slovakia		Primate's Palace	Bratislava	Archbishops of Esztergom
Slovakia		Summer Archbishop's Palace	Bratislava	Archbishops of Esztergom
Slovakia		Grassalkovich Palace	Bratislava	Antal Grassalkovich
Slovakia	Palffy Palace, Bratislava (20160110-IMG 3581)	Pálffy Palace	Bratislava	Count Leopold Pálffy
Slovakia	Blava 2007-3-28-57	Keglevich Palace	Bratislava	Count of Torna County, Joseph Keglevich
Slovakia	Aspremont palace 03	Aspremont Summer Palace	Bratislava	Count Johann Nepomuk Gobert d’Aspremont-Lynden
Slovenia		Dornava Mansion	Dornava near Ptuj	Dizma Attems
Spain		Royal Palace of Madrid	Madrid	Charles III of Spain
Spain		Royal Palace of Aranjuez	Aranjuez	Philip II of Spain
Spain		Palace of La Granja	San Ildefonso	Philip V of Spain
Spain		Royal Palace of Riofrío	Riofrío, Segovia	Isabella Farnese
Spain		Royal Palace of El Pardo	Madrid	Charles III of Spain (renovation)
Spain		Salón de Reinos	Madrid	Philip IV of Spain
Spain		Casita del Príncipe (El Escorial)	El Escorial	Charles IV of Spain
Spain		Palace of Infante don Luis	Boadilla del Monte, Madrid	Luis of Spain, Count of Chinchón
Spain		Liria Palace	Madrid	James Fitz-James Stuart, 3rd Duke of Berwick
Spain		Palace of the Dukes of Osuna	Madrid	María Josefa Pimentel, Duchess of Osuna
Spain		Palace of Goyeneche, Madrid	Madrid	Juan de Goyeneche
Spain		Palace of the Marquis of Dos Aguas	Valencia	Giner Rabassa de Perellós y Lanuza
Spain		Archbishop's Palace, Seville	Seville	Bishop of Seville
Spain	Palacio San Telmo facade Seville Spain	Palacio de San Telmo (Converted into a residence from a university building by Antoine, Duke of Montpensier)	Seville	Antoine, Duke of Montpensier
Spain	Barcelona - Palau de la Virreina - façana	Virreina Palace	Barcelona, Catalonia	Manuel d'Amat i de Junyent, Viceroy of Peru
Spain	Palacio de Santa Cruz5	Santa Cruz Palace, Madrid (converted into a Palace)	Madrid	Philip IV of Spain
Sweden		Bjärka-Säby Castle	Östergötland	Germund Louis Cederhielm
Sweden	Läckö castle	Läckö Castle	Läckö	Count Magnus Gabriel De la Gardie of Läckö
Sweden		Drottningholm Palace	Drottningholm	Queen Hedvig Eleonora
Sweden	Steninge slott	Steninge Palace	Uppland	Count Carl Gyllenstierna
Sweden		Skokloster Castle	Håbo	Carl Gustaf Wrangel
Sweden		Stockholm Palace	Stockholm	Frederick of Sweden
Sweden		Strömsholm Palace	Strömsholm	Queen Hedvig Eleonora
Sweden	Tessinisches palais stockholm	Tessin Palace	Stockholm	Nicodemus Tessin the Younger
Ukraine		Mariinskyi Palace	Kyiv	Empress Elisabeth
Ukraine	Klov Palace. Listed ID 80–382–0462. - 8 Pylypa Orlyka Street, Pechersk Raion, Kyiv. - Pechersk 28 09 13 396	Klov Palace	Kyiv	Kyiv Pechersk Lavra
Ukraine	Kyiv Frolovsky Klasztor 08	House of Rybalsky	Kyiv	Heorhiy Rybalsky
Ukraine		Wiśniowiecki Palace	Vyshnivets	Michał Serwacy Wiśniowiecki
Ukraine		Olyka Castle	Olyka	Michał Kazimierz "Rybeńko" Radziwiłł
Ukraine		~~Czartoryski Castle~~ (in ruin)	Korets	Stanisław Kostka Czartoryski
Ukraine		Pidhirtsi Castle	Pidhirtsi	Stanisław Koniecpolski
Ukraine		~~Sanguszko Palace~~ (in ruin)	Iziaslav (Zasław)	Barbara Sanguszkowa
Ukraine		Potocki Palace	Brody	Stanisław Potocki
Ukraine		Zbarazh Castle	Zbarazh	Krzysztof Zbaraski, Jerzy Zbaraski
Ukraine		Metropolitan Palace	Lviv	Franciszek Kulczycki
Ukraine	10 Market Square, Lviv (10)	Lubomirski Palace, Lviv	Lviv	Prince Stanisław Lubomirski
Ukraine	Львів, житловий будинок, Ринок пл. 3	Ubaldini tenement house	Lviv	Zhevusky Family
Ukraine	20 Market Square, Lviv (02)	Bielski's tenement house	Lviv	Konstanzia Bielska
Ukraine	1 Krakivska Street, Lviv (02)	Abrekiv tenement house	Lviv	Anton Kamiński (Watchmaker)
Ukraine	Палац сангушків заслав в федотов 2003	Sangushki Palace (Izyaslav)	Izyaslav	Barbara Sangushkova
Ukraine		Grand Palace	Zolochiv	Marek Sobieski
Ukraine		Chinese Palace	Zolochiv	John III Sobieski
Ukraine	CzerwonogrodPalacPotockich	Potocki Palace	Sheptytskyi	Franciszek Salezy Potocki
United Kingdom		Hampton Court Palace (additions by Sir Christopher Wren)	Richmond upon Thames	William and Mary
United Kingdom		Kensington Palace	London	William and Mary
United Kingdom		Blenheim Palace	Woodstock, Oxfordshire	John Churchill, 1st Duke of Marlborough
United Kingdom		Castle Howard	North Yorkshire	Charles Howard, 3rd Earl of Carlisle
United Kingdom		Chatsworth House	Chatsworth, Derbyshire	William Cavendish, 1st Duke of Devonshire
United Kingdom		Althorp	Northamptonshire	Robert Spencer, 2nd Earl of Sunderland
United Kingdom		Seaton Delaval Hall	Northumberland	John Delaval, 1st Baron Delaval
United Kingdom		Appuldurcombe House	Isle of Wight	Sir Robert Worsley, 3rd Baronet
United Kingdom		Dyrham Park	South Gloucestershire	William Blathwayt
United Kingdom		Petworth House	West Sussex	Charles Seymour, 6th Duke of Somerset
United Kingdom	Lions House Bridgwater	Lion's House	Bridgwater	Benjamin Holloway
United Kingdom	Burford GreatHouse	The Great House	Burford	
United Kingdom	BurfordBaroque	Burford Methodist Church (initially a residence, became a church)	Burford	John Jordan
United Kingdom		The Ivy	Chippenham	John Norris
United Kingdom	Chettle House - geograph.org.uk - 1289854	Chettle House	Chettle	George Chafin
United Kingdom	General Wolfe's House, Trim Street, Bath - geograph.org.uk - 3802773	General Wolfe's House	Bath and North East Somerset	General Wolfe
United Kingdom	Rosewell House, Kingsmead Square, Bath - geograph.org.uk - 1761034	Rosewell House	Bath	Thomas Rosewell
United Kingdom	Farfield Hall, Addingham (geograph 3489481)	Fairfield Hall	Addingham	
United Kingdom	West Hanney House Geograph-2946763-by-Des-Blenkinsopp	West Hanney House	West Hanney	
United Kingdom	Kings Weston House crop	Kings Weston House	Lawrence Weston	Edward Southwell
United Kingdom	Grimsthorpe Castle - North Facade	Grimsthorpe Castle (additions by Sir John Vanbrugh)	Lincolnshire	Robert Bertie, 1st Duke of Ancaster and Kesteven
United Kingdom	Kemerton Court, west front	Kemerton Court	Kemerton	John Parsons III
United Kingdom	Wotton House cropped	Wotton House	Wotton Underwood	
United Kingdom	South front 1 - Chicheley Hall, Buckinghamshire	Chicheley Hall	Chicheley	Sir John Chester
United Kingdom	Main-House	Aynhoe Park (additions by Thomas Archer)	Aynho	
United Kingdom	Roehampton House 03	Roehampton House	Roehampton	Thomas Cary
United Kingdom	Heythrop Park 01	Heythrop Park	Heythrop	Charles Talbot, 1st Duke of Shrewsbury
United Kingdom	Marlow 013	Marlow Place	Marlow	John Wallop, 1st Viscount Lymington
United Kingdom	Monmouth House, Soho Square	~~Monmouth House~~ (demolished in 1773)	Soho Square	James Scott, 1st Duke of Monmouth, 1st Duke of Buccleuch
United Kingdom	Bramham Park, Bramham (geograph 3489445)	Bramham Park	Bramham	Robert Benson, 1st Baron Bingley
United Kingdom	Goose Pie House	~~Goose-Pie House~~ (demolished)	Whitehall	Sir John Vanbrugh
United Kingdom	Easton Neston east side 21 July 1985	Easton Neston house	Easton Neston	William Fermor, 1st Baron Leominster
United Kingdom	The front facade of Beningbrough Hall	Beningbrough Hall	Beningbrough	John Bourchier
United Kingdom	Tadworth Court - geograph.org.uk - 1056960	Tadworth Court	Reigate and Banstead	Leonard Wessel
United Kingdom	Barnsley Park (geograph 5771306)	Barnsley Park	Barnsley	Henry Perrot, MP for Oxford
United Kingdom	Wentworth Woodhouse west front	Wentworth Woodhouse (West Front by Ralph Turnicliffe)	Wentworth, South Yorkshire	Thomas Watson-Wentworth, 1st Marquess of Rockingham
United Kingdom	Stainborough (Wentworth Castle) east wing	Wentworth Castle (East Wing)	Stainborough	Thomas Wentworth, Baron Raby
United Kingdom	Sudbury Hall - north-east view	Sudbury Hall	Sudbury, Derbyshire	George Vernon
United Kingdom	Former Dalkeith Palace, Dalkeith Country Park	Dalkeith Palace	Dalkeith	Anne Scott, 1st Duchess of Buccleuch
United Kingdom	Duff House 20110520	Duff House	Banff, Aberdeenshire, Scotland	William Duff
United Kingdom	Compton House	Compton Beauchamp House	Compton Beauchamp, Oxfordshire	Fettiplace family
United Kingdom	Compton House	Kimbolton Castle	Kimbolton, Cambridgeshire	Charles Montagu, 1st Duke of Manchester
