= Radomierzyce, Zgorzelec County =

Radomierzyce
- Village
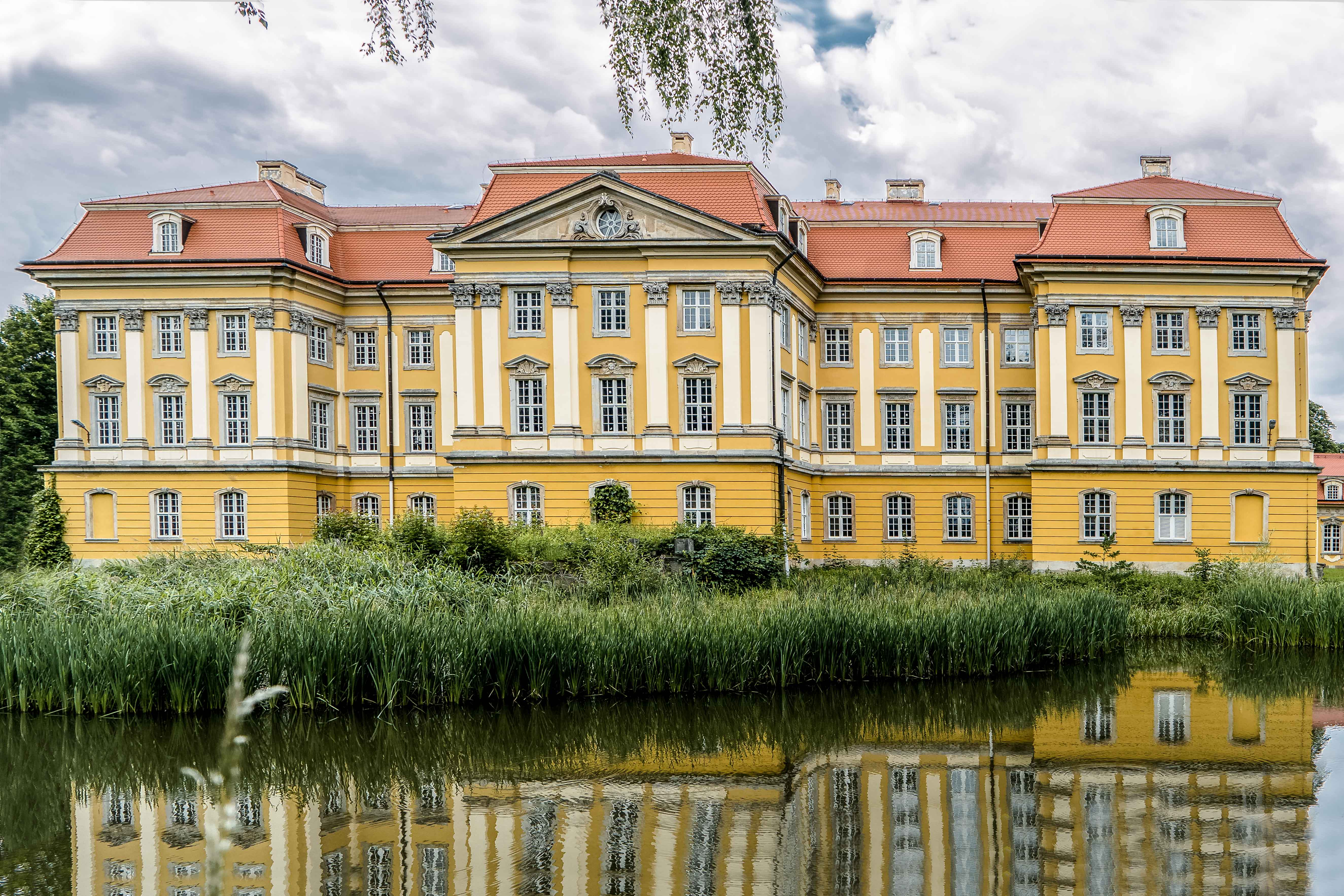
- Palace
- Interactive map of Radomierzyce
- Location within Poland
- Coordinates: 51°4′N 14°58′E
- Country: Poland
- Voivodeship: Lower Silesian
- County: Zgorzelec
- Gmina: Zgorzelec
- First mentioned: 1249

Population
  - Total: 316
- Time zone: UTC+1 (CET)
  - Summer (DST): UTC+2 (CEST)
- Vehicle registration: DZG

Radomierzyce [radɔmjɛˈʐɨt͡sɛ] (German: Radmeritz; Upper Sorbian: Radomjerzycy) is a village in the administrative district of Gmina Zgorzelec, within Zgorzelec County, Lower Silesian Voivodeship, in south-western Poland, close to the German border. It is located in the historical region of Lusatia.

The name is of Slavic origin, and comes from the Slavic prefix rad-.

The local landmark is the Baroque palace, built in 1710–1732 by Joachim Ziegler-Klipphausen, chamberlain of King Augustus II the Strong. Other notable cultural heritage monuments are the Baroque Saints Peter and Paul church and the chamberlain's Baroque mausoleum.

The Mikułowa–Bogatynia railway passes south of the village. A small concrete platform was constructed adjacent to the railway line, however a railway station serving the town was never opened.

== Gallery ==
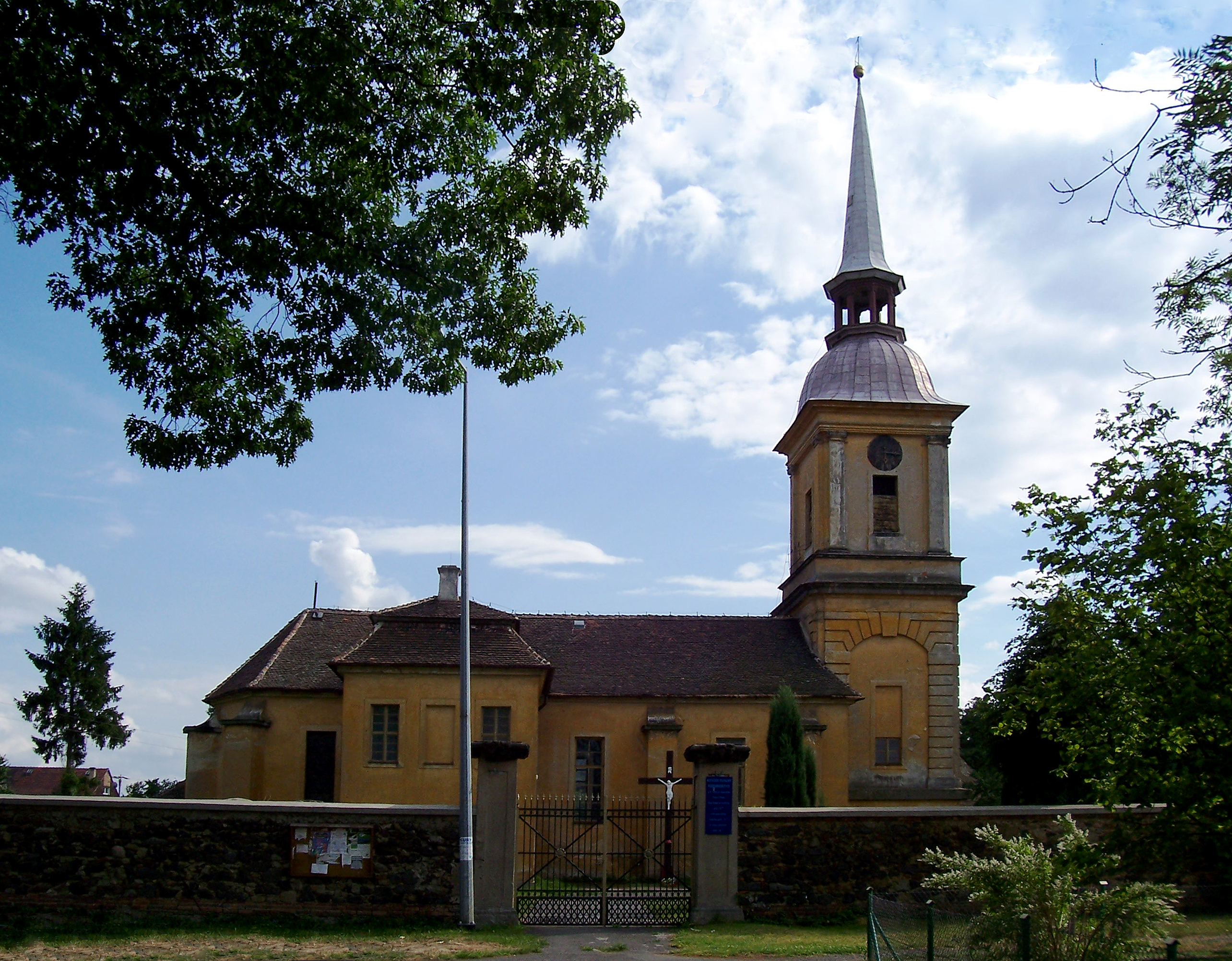
Saints Peter and Paul Church

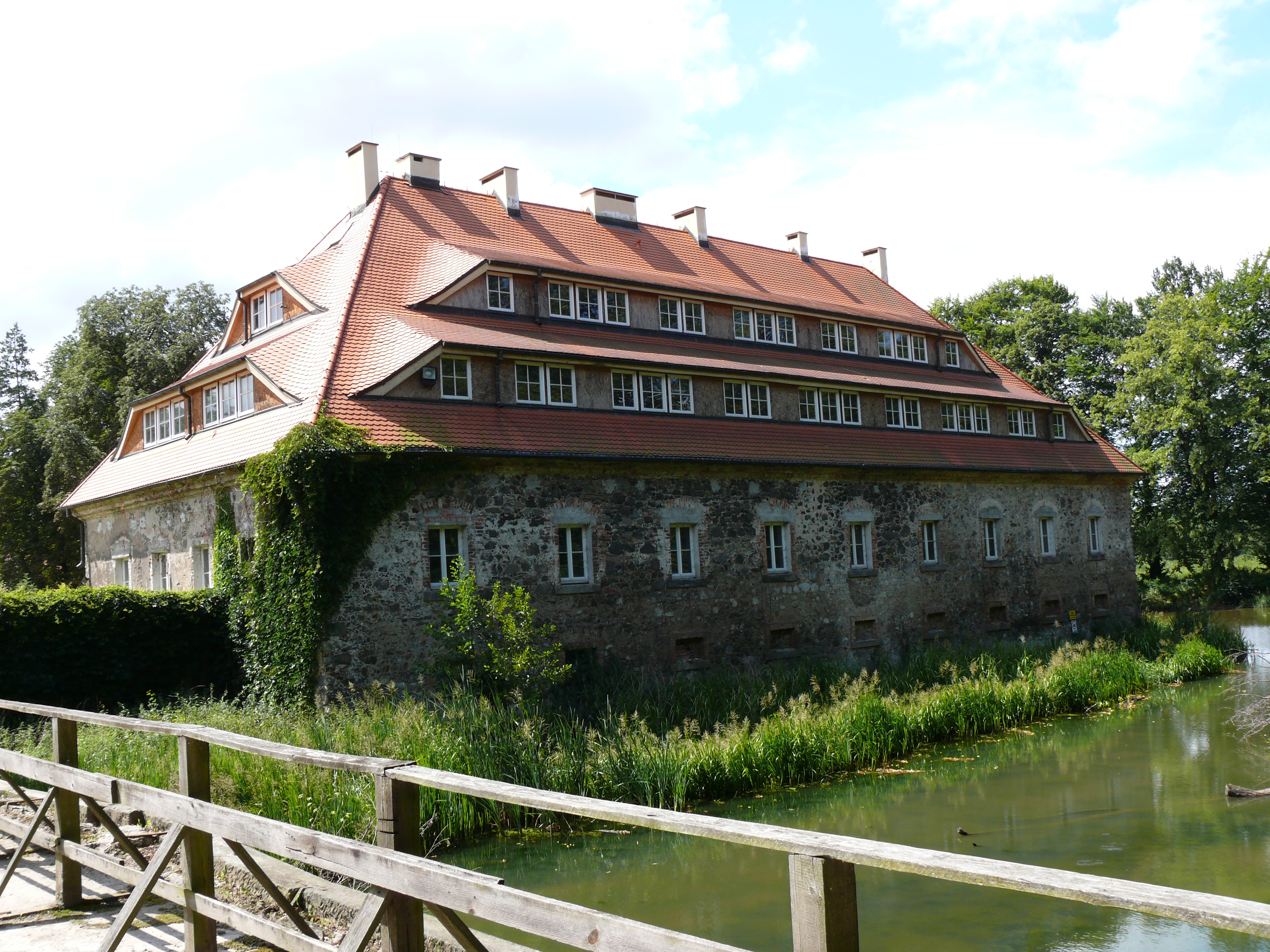
House in the palacial garden

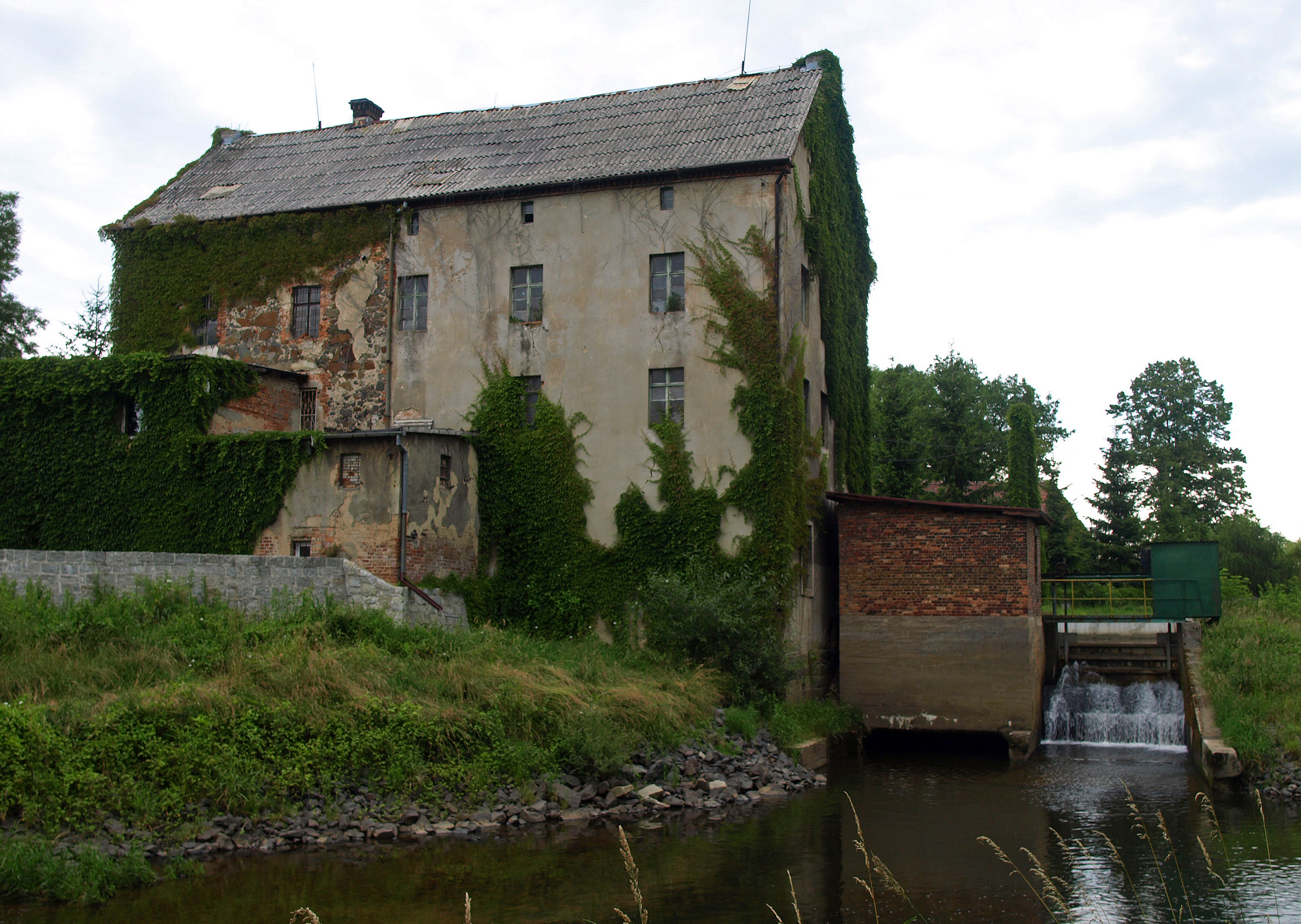
Watermill

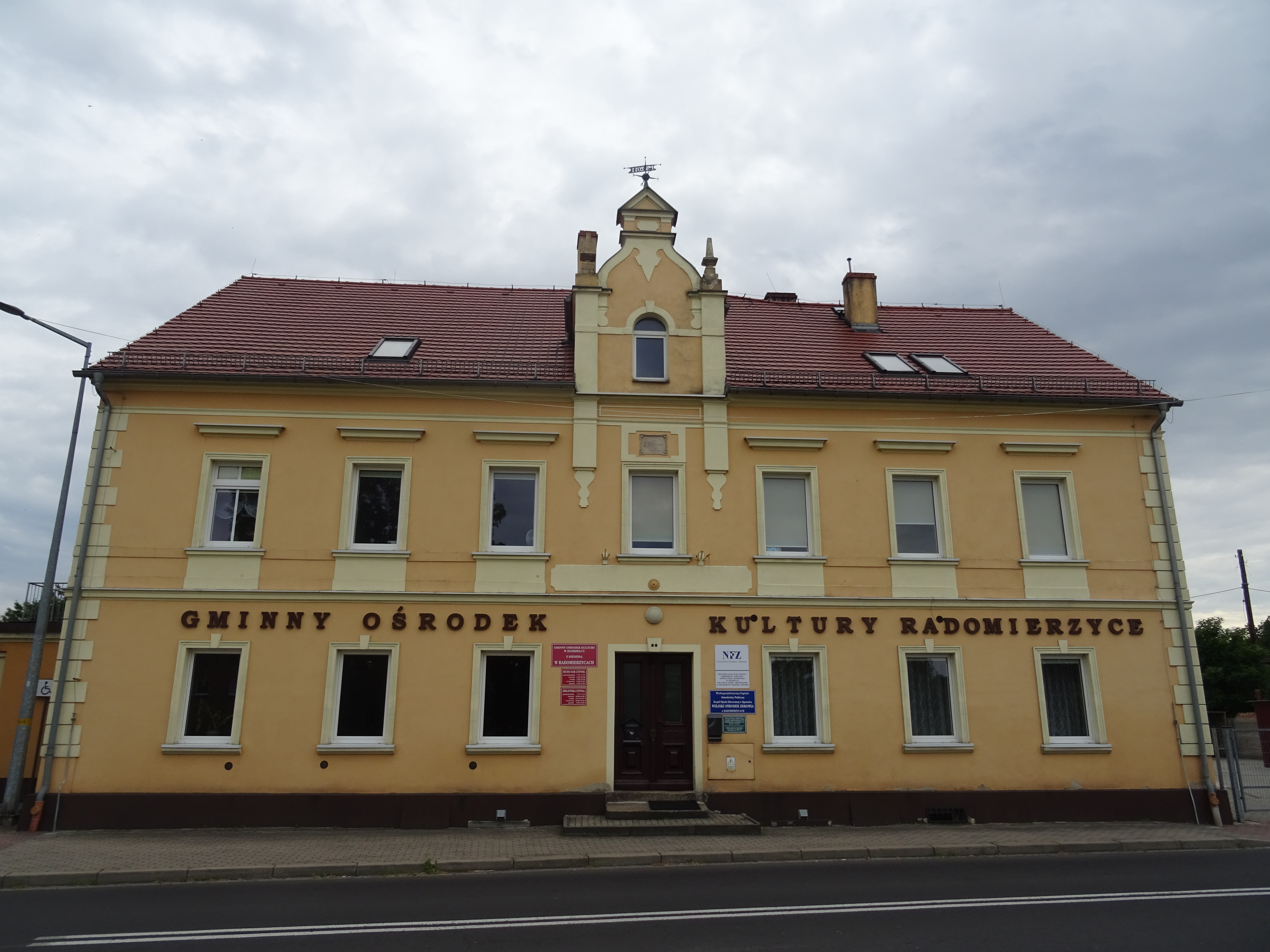
Culture centre
