= Riofrío, Ávila =

Riofrío
- municipality
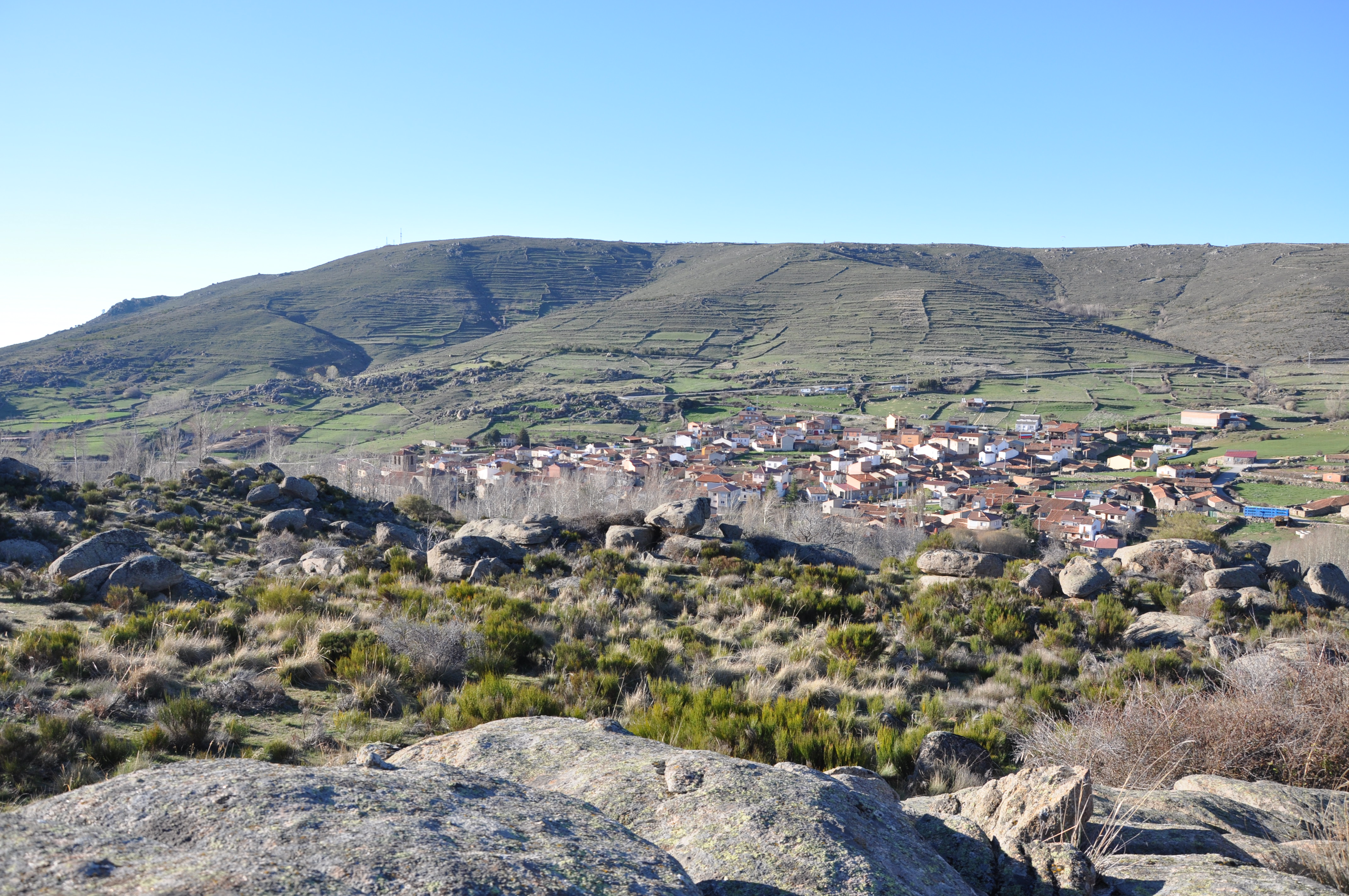
- Riofrío, (Ávila), Spain.

- Flag Coat of arms

- Location in Spain. Riofrío (Spain)
- Coordinates: 40°32′50″N 4°46′38″W
- Country: Spain
- Autonomous community: Castile and León
- Province: Ávila
- Municipality: Riofrío

Area
  - Total: 65 km^{2} (25 sq mi)

Population (2025-01-01)
  - Total: 188
  - Density: 2.9/km^{2} (7.5/sq mi)
- Time zone: UTC+1 (CET)
  - Summer (DST): UTC+2 (CEST)
- Website: Official website

Riofrío (Spanish pronunciation: [rjoˈfɾi.o]) is a municipality located in the province of Ávila, Castile and León, Spain.

== Population ==
Historical population
Year	Pop.	±% p.a.
2023	195	—
2024	191	−2.05%
2025	188	−1.57%
Source: INE
