= Čechtice =

- Market town
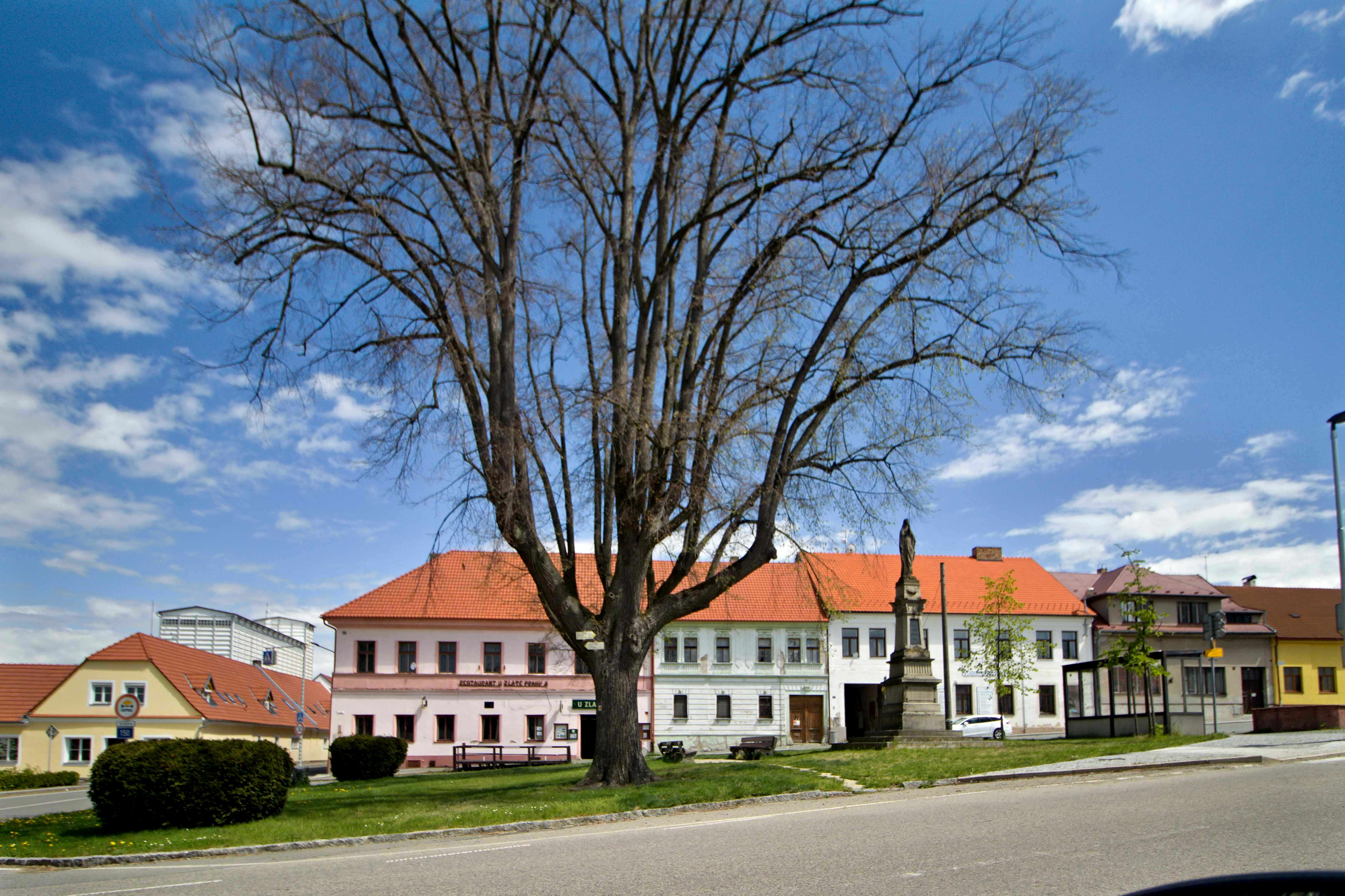
- Centre of Čechtice

- Flag Coat of arms

- Location in the Czech Republic
- Coordinates: 49°37′27″N 15°2′54″E
- Country: Czech Republic
- Region: Central Bohemian
- District: Benešov
- First mentioned: 1315

Area
  - Total: 39.41 km^{2} (15.22 sq mi)
- Elevation: 478 m (1,568 ft)

Population (2026-01-01)
  - Total: 1,448
  - Density: 36.74/km^{2} (95.16/sq mi)
- Time zone: UTC+1 (CET)
  - Summer (DST): UTC+2 (CEST)
- Postal code: 257 65
- Website: www.mestys-cechtice.cz

Čechtice (Czech pronunciation: [ˈtʃɛxcɪtsɛ]) is a market town in Benešov District in the Central Bohemian Region of the Czech Republic. It has about 1,400 inhabitants.

== Administrative division ==
Čechtice consists of 14 municipal parts (in brackets population according to the 2021 census):

- Čechtice (949)
- Černičí (46)
- Dobříkovice (14)
- Jeníkov (113)
- Krčmy (2)
- Malá Paseka (27)
- Nakvasovice (50)
- Nové Práchňany (17)
- Otročice (103)
- Palčice (10)
- Růžkovy Lhotice (17)
- Staré Práchňany (24)
- Sudislavice (3)
- Zhoř (9)

== Etymology ==
The name is derived from the personal name Čechta, meaning "the village of Čechta's people".

== Geography ==
Čechtice is located about 31 kilometres (19 mi) southeast of Benešov and 60 km (37 mi) southeast of Prague. It lies in the Křemešník Highlands. The highest point is the hill Zhoř at 626 m (2,054 ft) above sea level.

== History ==
The first written mention of Čechtice is from 1315. The greatest prosperity occurred in the 16th century, during the rule of the Střela of Rokyce family. As a result, Čechtice was promoted to a market town in 1592. The properties of the family were confiscated in 1622 after the Battle of White Mountain.

After the Battle of White Mountain, Čechtice were acquired by the Halleweil family. They had built here a castle. The next notable owner of the estate was John Leopold of Trautson and Falkenstein, who bought it in 1702. He restored the local school and moved the administration of the estate from Křivsoudov to Čechtice.

== Demographics ==
Historical population

Year	Pop.	±%
1869	2,951	—
1880	3,043	+3.1%
1890	2,982	−2.0%
1900	2,862	−4.0%
1910	2,811	−1.8%

Year	Pop.	±%
1921	2,726	−3.0%
1930	2,417	−11.3%
1950	1,960	−18.9%
1961	1,931	−1.5%
1970	1,667	−13.7%

Year	Pop.	±%
1980	1,564	−6.2%
1991	1,434	−8.3%
2001	1,424	−0.7%
2011	1,406	−1.3%
2021	1,384	−1.6%

Source: Censuses

== Transport ==
There are no railways or major roads passing through the municipal territory.

== Sights ==
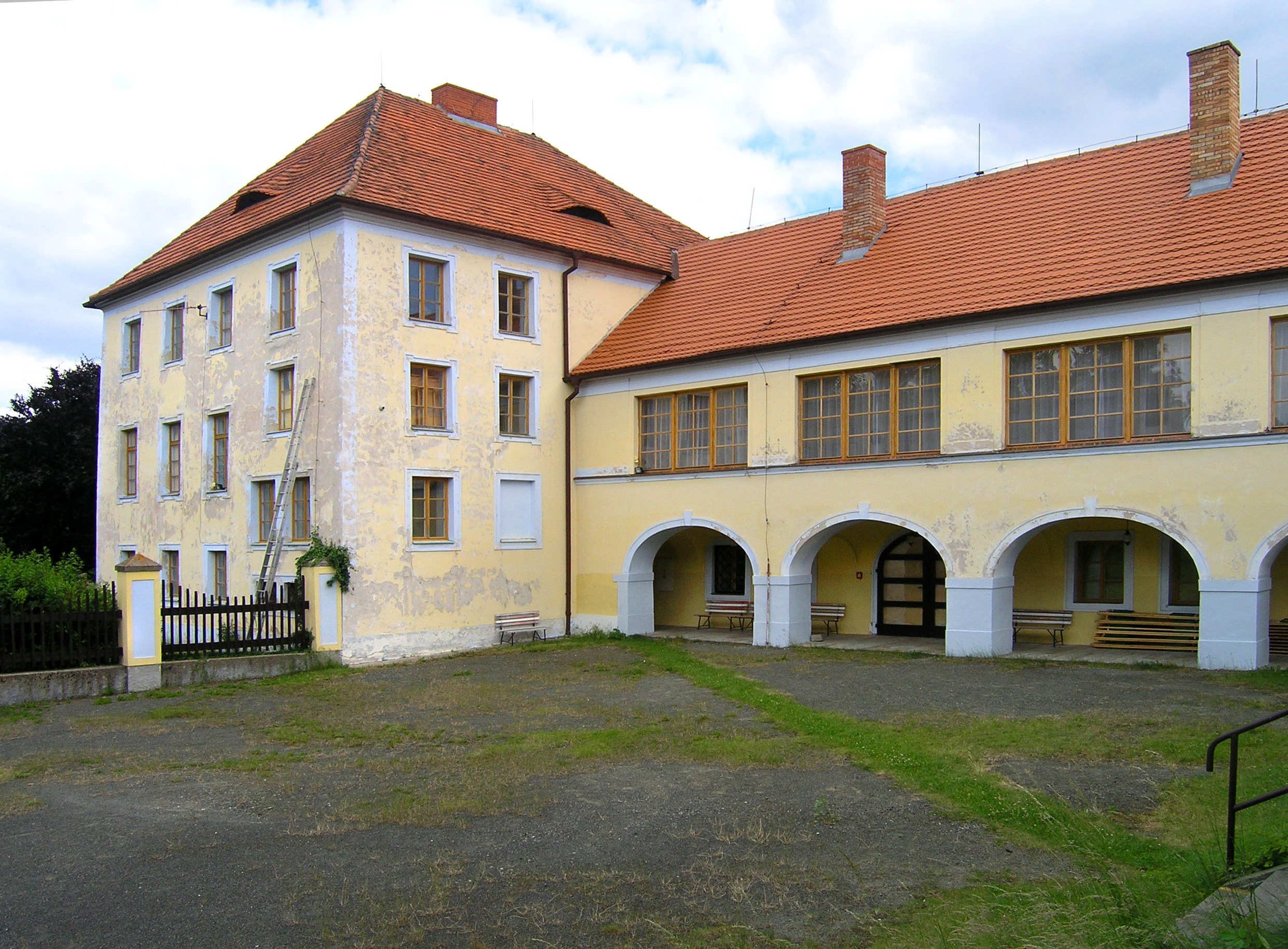
Růžkovy Lhotice Castle

The Čechtice Castle is a Baroque castle built in 1656–1658. Its north wing was never completed, but the west wing was extended at the end of the 17th century. Today it is a hotel.

The Church of Saint James the Great was originally a Gothic church from the 14th century. After it was badly damaged by fires in 1741 and 1792, it was rebuilt in the Baroque style.

In Růžkovy Lhotice is the Růžkovy Lhotice Castle. It is a late Baroque building from the second half of the 18th century. Today it houses the regional museum.
