= Symonowicz Palace =

Palace in Warsaw, Poland

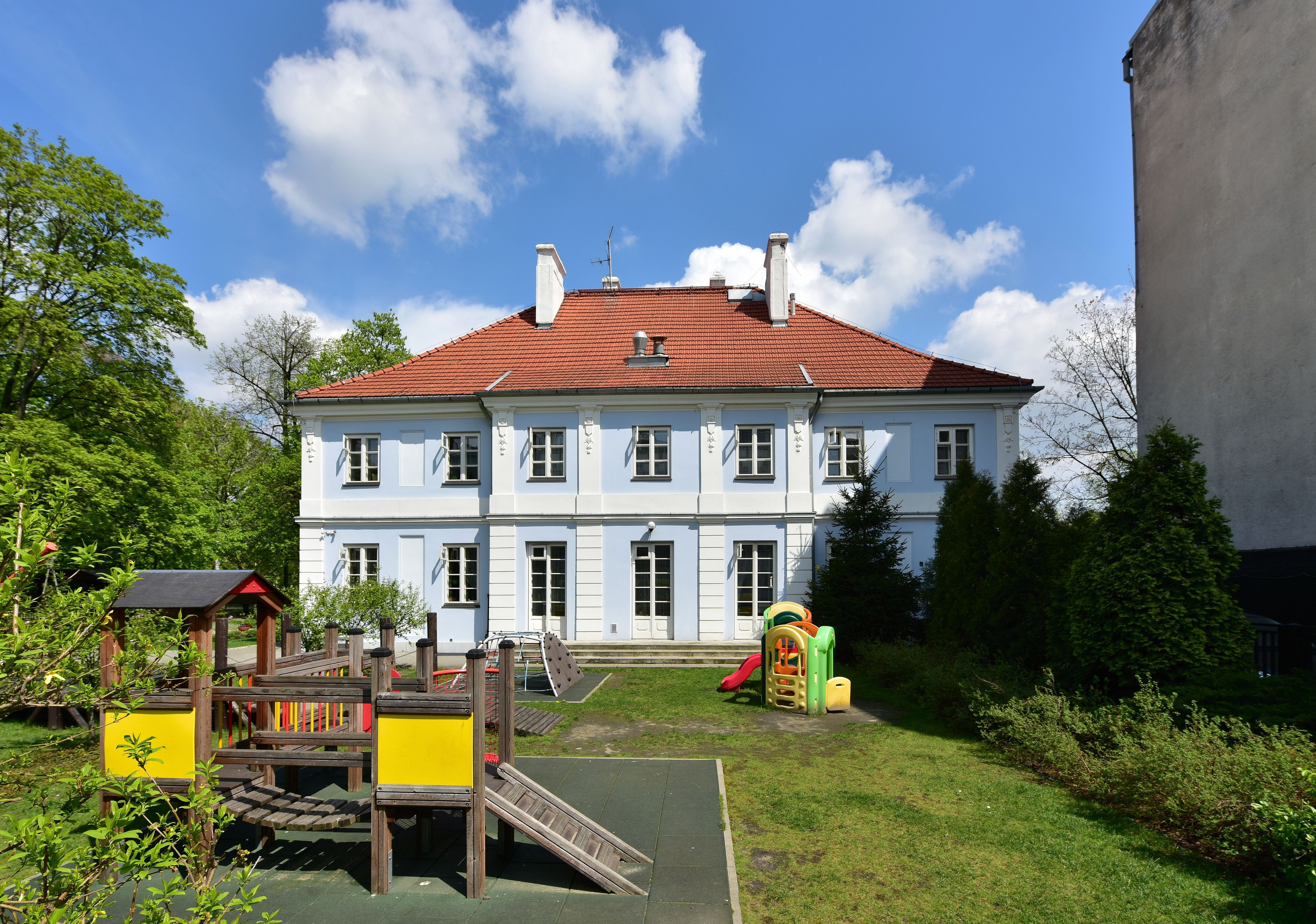
- The Symonowicz Palace in 2017.
- Interactive map of the Symonowicz Palace area

General information
- Architectural style: Baroque
- Location: Warsaw, Poland, 37 Solec Street
- Coordinates: 52°13′39.583″N 21°02′29.317″E

Design and construction
- Architect: Pierre Ricaud de Tirregaille

The Symonowicz Palace, (Note: Polish: Pałac Symonowiczów) also known as the Szymonowicz Palace, (Note: Polish: Pałac Szymonowiczów) and Szymonowicz House, (Note: Polish: Dom Szymonowicza) is a baroque palace in the city of Warsaw, Poland, located at 37 Solec Street.

== History ==
The exact year of the construction of the Symonowicz Palace remains unknown, but it is known that it was built before 1762.

It was designed by architect Pierre Ricaud de Tirregaille in the baroque style. In 1770, it became the property of nobleperson Simon de Symonowicz. In the 19th century, the building frequently changed owners.

In 1944, during the Warsaw Uprising in the Second World War, in its area took place heavy fighting, and the building was used as the hospital by the partisants. It was destroyed during the war, and rebuilt in 1951.

Currently, the building houses a kindergarten.
