= Petrohrad =

- Municipality
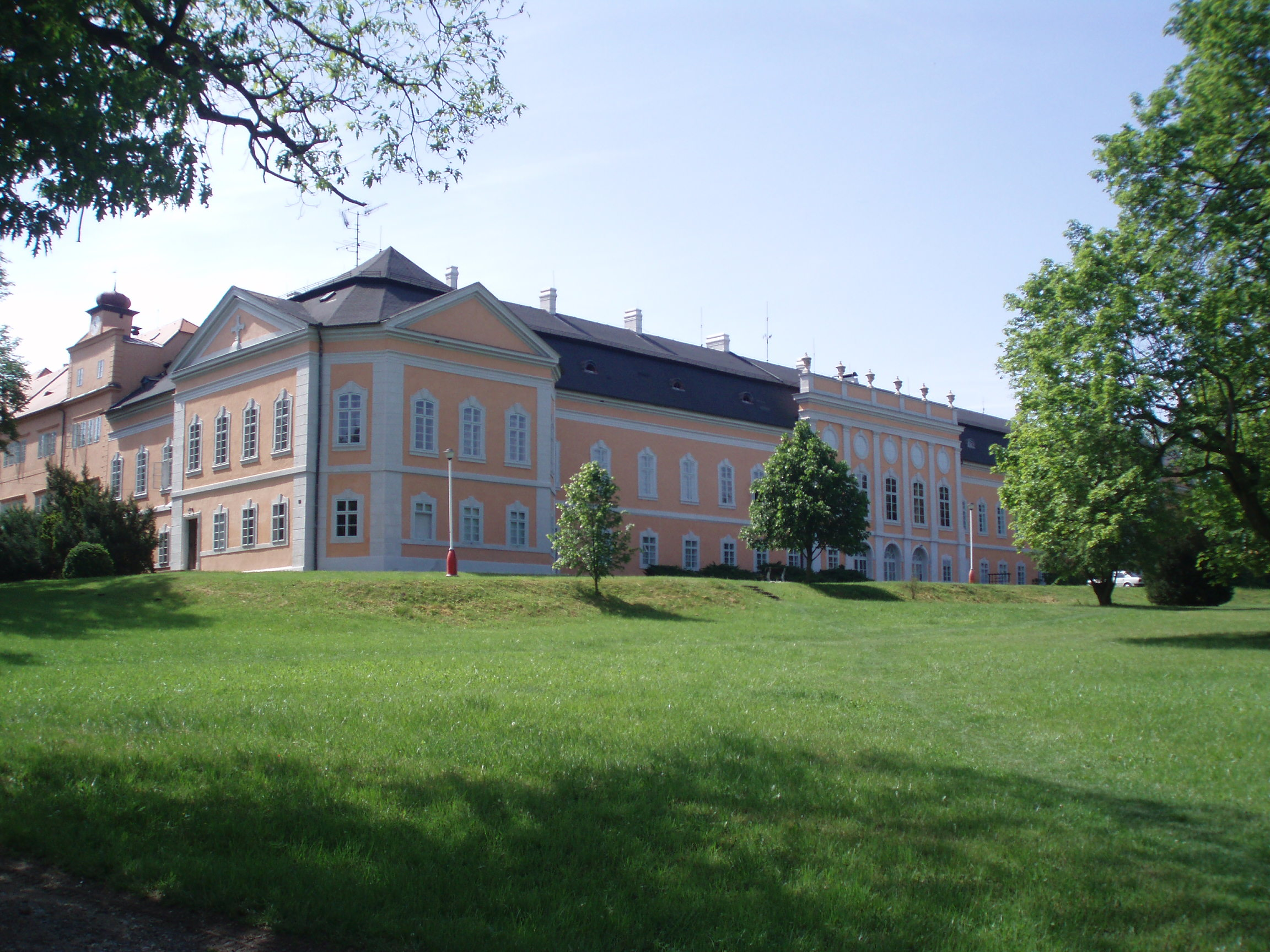
- Petrohrad Castle

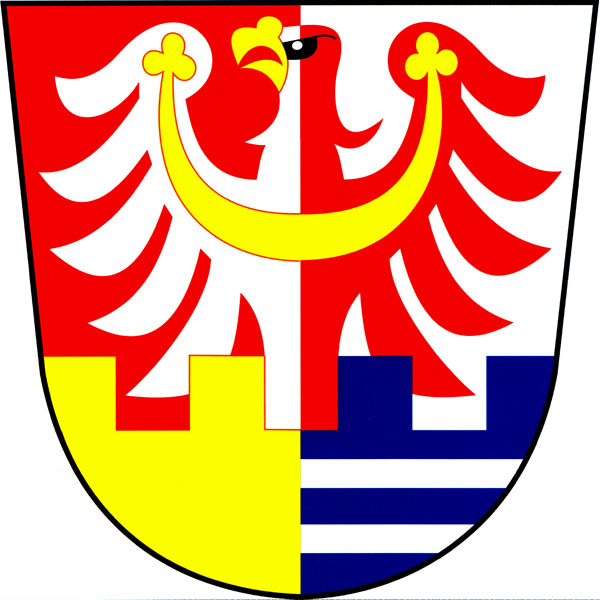
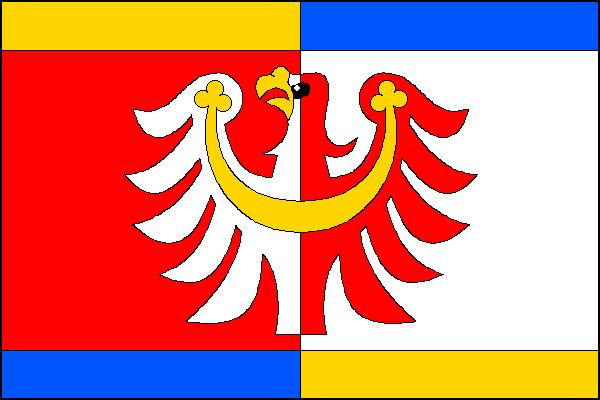
- Flag Coat of arms

- Location in the Czech Republic
- Coordinates: 50°7′39″N 13°26′47″E
- Country: Czech Republic
- Region: Ústí nad Labem
- District: Louny
- First mentioned: 1360

Area
  - Total: 18.50 km^{2} (7.14 sq mi)
- Elevation: 365 m (1,198 ft)

Population (2026-01-01)
  - Total: 621
  - Density: 33.6/km^{2} (86.9/sq mi)
- Time zone: UTC+1 (CET)
  - Summer (DST): UTC+2 (CEST)
- Postal codes: 439 85, 441 01
- Website: www.petrohrad-obec.cz

Petrohrad (German: Petersburg) is a municipality and village in Louny District in the Ústí nad Labem Region of the Czech Republic. It has about 600 inhabitants.

Petrohrad lies approximately 36 kilometres (22 mi) south-west of Louny, 73 km (45 mi) south-west of Ústí nad Labem, and 71 km (44 mi) west of Prague.

== Administrative division ==
Petrohrad consists of three municipal parts (in brackets population according to the 2021 census):

- Petrohrad (482)
- Bílenec (56)
- Černčice (140)

== Demographics ==
Historical population
Year	Pop.	±%
1869	1,092	—
1880	1,241	+13.6%
1890	1,194	−3.8%
1900	1,232	+3.2%
1910	1,281	+4.0%
1921	1,458	+13.8%
1930	1,590	+9.1%
1950	929	−41.6%
1961	1,055	+13.6%
1970	1,029	−2.5%
1980	853	−17.1%
1991	729	−14.5%
2001	690	−5.3%
2011	749	+8.6%
2021	678	−9.5%
Source: Censuses
