= Waleffe Castle =

Castle in Wallonia, Belgium

Coordinates: 50.636°N 5.229°E

- Belgium
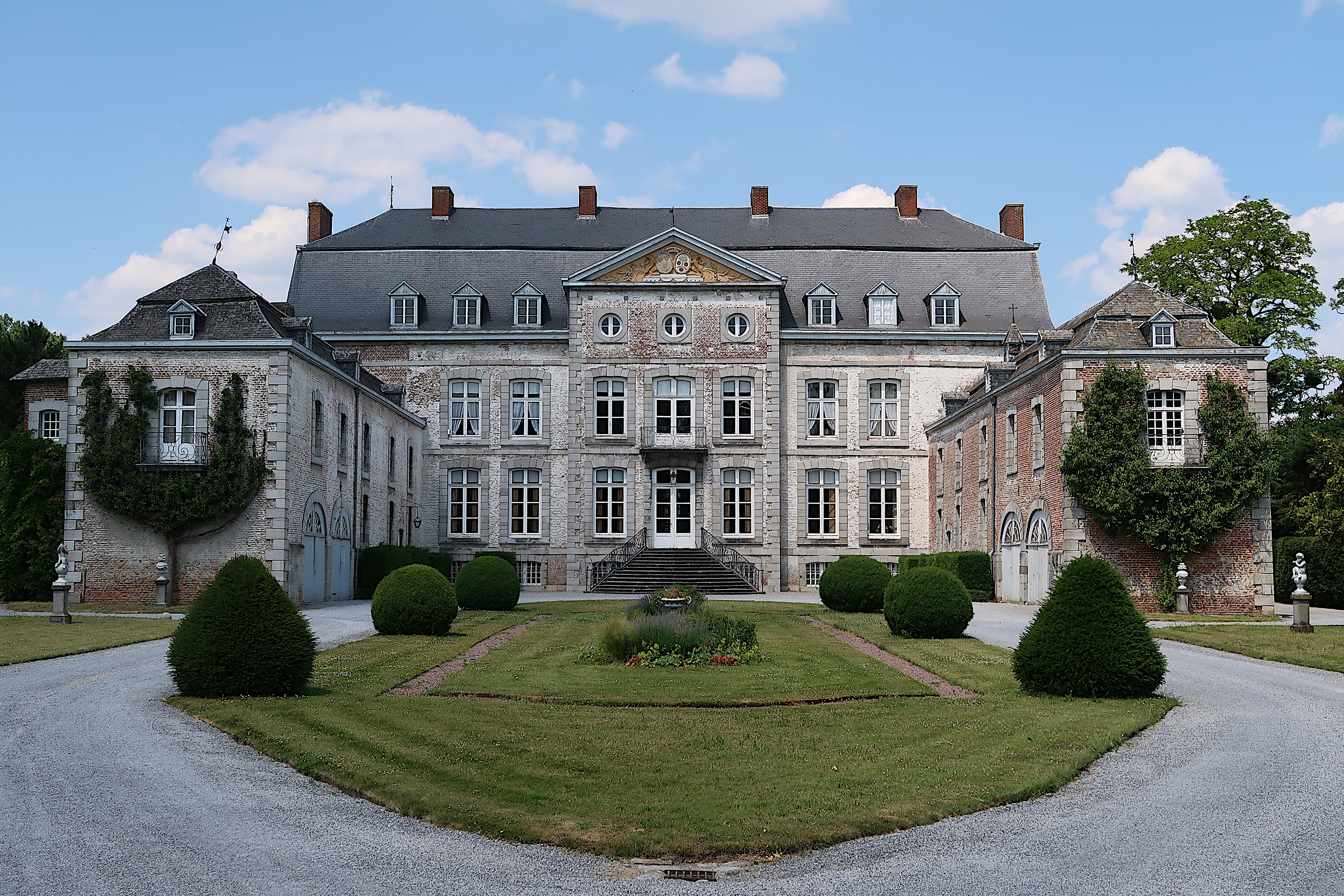

Site information
- Type: Castle

Waleffe Castle is a castle in Belgium, located in the Belgian municipality of Les Waleffes in the northwest of the Province of Liège. Both the exterior and interior of the Louis XIV-style castle have been completely preserved and are part of Wallonia's most important cultural heritage.

== History ==
The castle was built by the wealthy Liège native Blaise Henri de Corte (1661-1734), grandson of Jean de Corte, who had built an arms empire in Liège and, among other things, commissioned the construction of the Hôtel Curtius. His grandson Blaise Henri de Corte was also a munitions manufacturer, as well as an army commander and poet.

He inherited the pre-existing 16th century farmstead from his mother, Marguerite-Victoire d'Alagon, but decided to completely rebuild it. The architect was the Frenchman J. Verniole, and the interior was designed by Daniel Marot, who had worked for several years at the court of William III of Orange in The Hague.

The castle has remained in the possession of the same family for the past 13 generations, the Barons de Potesta de Waleffe, who are direct descents of Jean de Corte.

== Description ==
The complex comprises a Louis XIV-style castle, construction of which began in 1706. The living quarters are centrally located and flanked by two side wings, following a symmetrical plan. On the southwest side, the striking, 32-meter-high dovecote of the castle farm attracts attention. On the other side of the castle lies a castle farm in the form of a closed square.
The interior of the castle has been preserved in its original state, with richly decorated staircases, luxuriously furnished salons, murals, and decorative stuccowork by the Italian J.B. Luraghi, all designed by Daniel Marot.

Part of the castle can be rented for parties or seminars, and overnight stays are also possible.

== See also ==
- List of castles in Belgium
