= Ořechov (Uherské Hradiště District) =

- Municipality
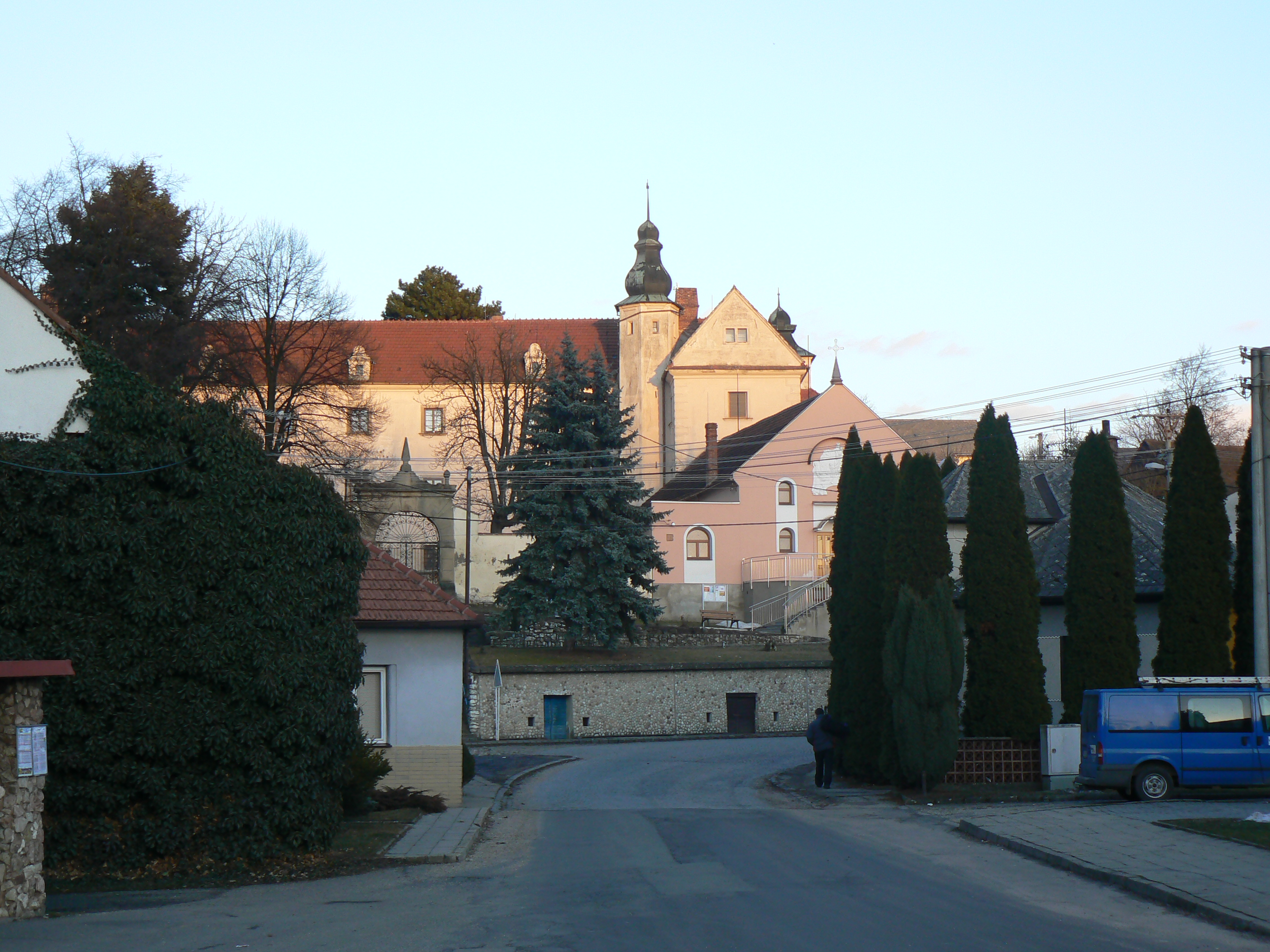
- Ořechov Castle

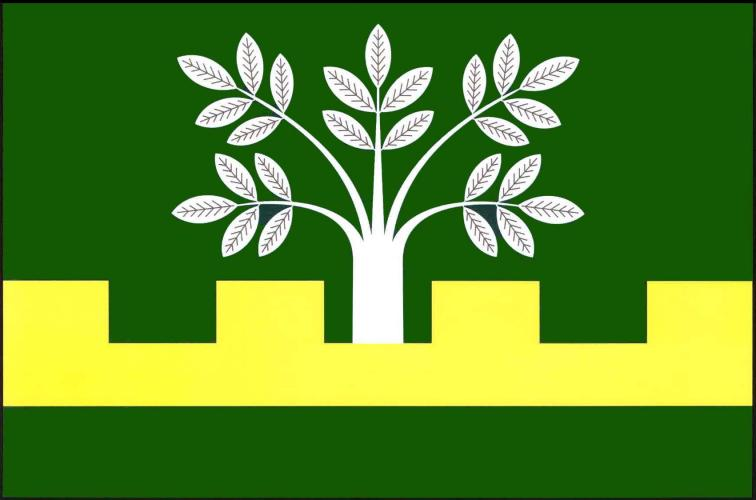
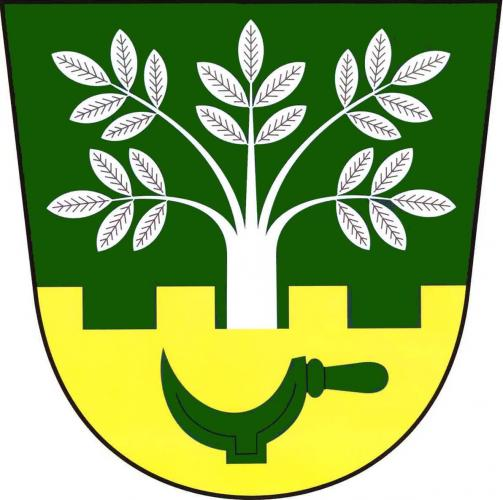
- Flag Coat of arms

- Location in the Czech Republic
- Coordinates: 49°1′50″N 17°18′3″E
- Country: Czech Republic
- Region: Zlín
- District: Uherské Hradiště
- First mentioned: 1141

Area
  - Total: 5.97 km^{2} (2.31 sq mi)
- Elevation: 258 m (846 ft)

Population (2026-01-01)
  - Total: 800
  - Density: 130/km^{2} (350/sq mi)
- Time zone: UTC+1 (CET)
  - Summer (DST): UTC+2 (CEST)
- Postal code: 687 37
- Website: www.orechov-uh.cz

Ořechov is a municipality and village in Uherské Hradiště District in the Zlín Region of the Czech Republic. It has about 800 inhabitants.

Ořechov lies approximately 13 kilometres (8 mi) west of Uherské Hradiště, 36 km (22 mi) south-west of Zlín, and 239 km (149 mi) south-east of Prague.

== Demographics ==
Historical population
Year	Pop.	±%
1869	767	—
1880	873	+13.8%
1890	875	+0.2%
1900	838	−4.2%
1910	932	+11.2%
1921	972	+4.3%
1930	847	−12.9%
1950	845	−0.2%
1961	971	+14.9%
1970	906	−6.7%
1980	798	−11.9%
1991	651	−18.4%
2001	650	−0.2%
2011	697	+7.2%
2021	729	+4.6%
Source: Censuses
