= Palacete de Belomonte =

Palacette of Belomonte
- Palacete de Belomonte
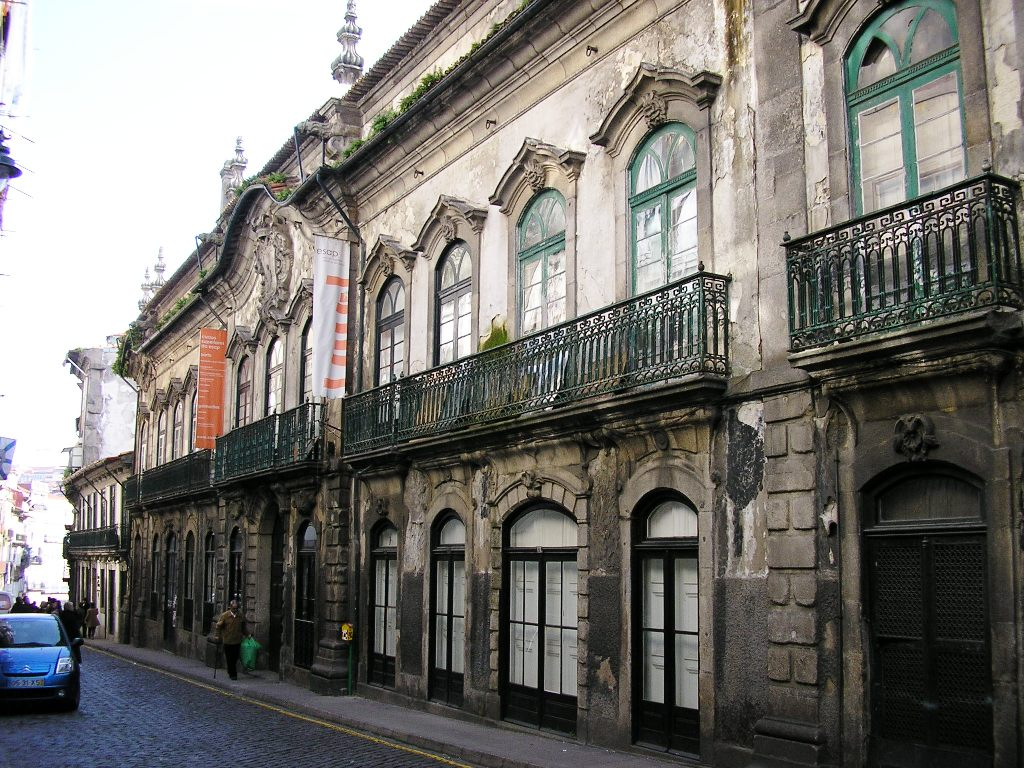
- The front facade of the Belomonte
- Interactive map of the Palacette of Belomonte area

General information
- Type: Palacette
- Architectural style: Baroque
- Location: Cedofeita, Santo Ildefonso, Sé, Miragaia, São Nicolau e Vitória, Portugal
- Coordinates: 41°8′33″N 8°36′58″W
- Opened: 18th century
- Owner: Portugal

Technical details
- Material: Granite

The Palacette of Belomonte (Portuguese: Palacete de Belomonte/Palácio de Belomonte/Casa dos Pacheco Pereira) is a former-residence on Rua de Belomonte, in the civil parish of Cedofeita, Santo Ildefonso, Sé, Miragaia, São Nicolau e Vitória, in the northern Portuguese city of Porto.

== History ==
Up until the 18th century, the building functioned as the Colégio de São Sebastião (College of São Sebastião), and the Banco Aliança.

The current building was constructed in the 18th century.

By the middle of the 19th century, it was one of the principal meeting places associated with the Portuense high society. Following the death of João Pacheco Pereira (then owner) the building was obtained by collateral line of the family, but with time, fell into decline.

In 1888, the residence was bought by the Companhia de Ferro Através de África (Iron Company Through Africa), and the family coat-of-arms was removed, to be replaced by a royal coat-of-arms.

== Architecture ==
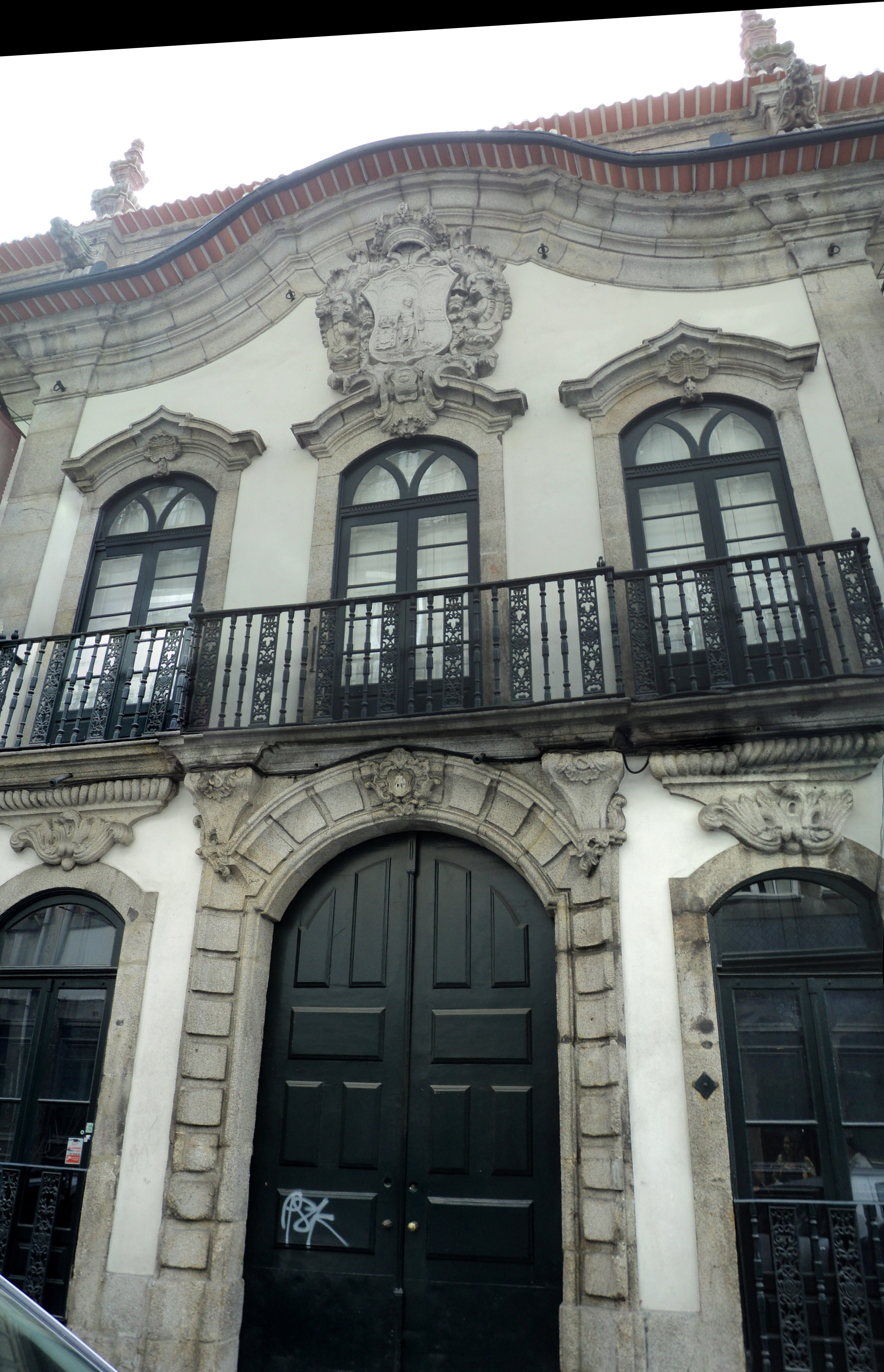
The main accessway to the former-residence

The building is flanked by a three- and two-storey building, located with a long narrow area between the Rua de Belomonte and Rua do Comércio do Porto., near the Palace of São João Novo. The long symmetrical, rectangular Baroque manorhouse is marked by a two-storey frontispiece and Mansard roof, with undulating cornices and sculpted granite stone.

The long building consists of a simple volume covered in Mansard and roof tile, with its principal facade oriented towards the roadway. This facade is oriented towards the north, consisting of a symmetric and subdivided form in five parts, divided by six pilasters. On the extremes of the building are accented doorways, surmounted by coat-of-arms and oculi, broken by granite cornices that run the length of the building. The ground floor consists of rounded window door, repeated above by windows topped with undulating forms. Over the Mansard roof are six pinnacles in masonry aligned by pilasters. The rear facade is circled by a long, wide varanda between the two corps, while the front facade includes several varandas with ironwork over plinths in granite and surmounted by pinnacles.

The interior space includes a rectangular entranceway with slabs and granite staircase with balustrades. Over the staircase is an elliptic candelabra, surrounded by stucco walls decorated in carved flourishes. The ceiling of the entranceway in wood leads to rooms that plastered and decorated with paintings.
