= Casa do Carmo =

Historic house in Guimarães, Portugal

Carmo House
- Casa do Carmo
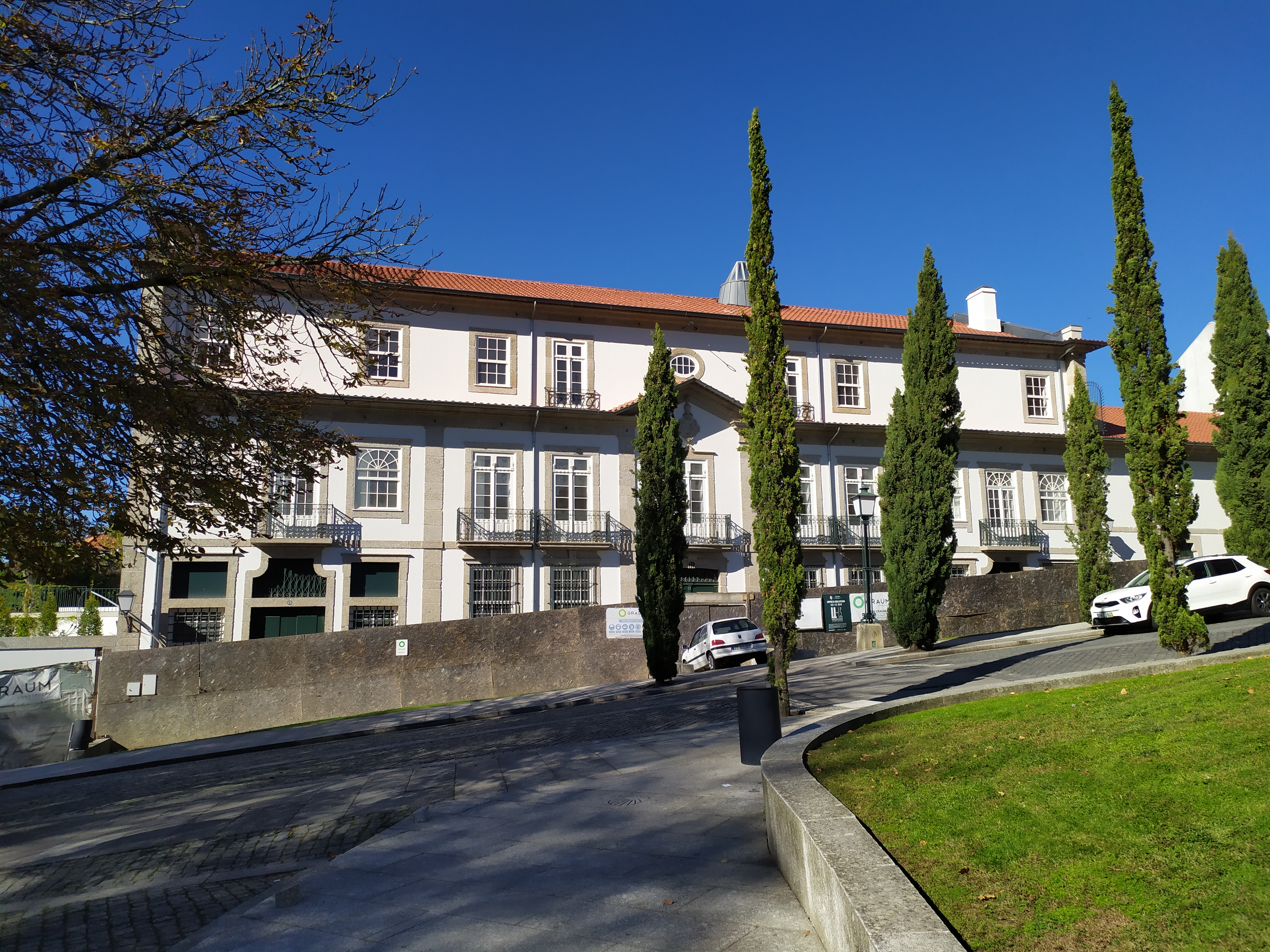
- The Carmo House in 2021
- Interactive map of the Carmo House area
- Alternative names: Casa dos Condes de Margaride (House of the Counts of Margaride)

General information
- Status: Inserted inside the GHC
- Architectural style: Baroque
- Classification: Protected landmark
- Location: Oliveira, São Paio e São Sebastião, Guimarães, Portugal
- Coordinates: 41.44645°N 8.29271°W
- Construction started: Before 1788
- Renovated: 2014-2020

Technical details
- Floor count: 3

The Carmo House (Portuguese: Casa do Carmo) is a noble 18th-century baroque house in Guimarães, Portugal. It served as the royal residence for the kings while visiting the city during the late Portuguese monarchy.

== Description ==
The Casa do Carmo belonged to the Count of Margaride. It’s located in Guimarães, at the Carmo Square. The middle of the facade is adorned with a broken shield with the Cardoso and Macedos arms on its front.

== History ==
=== Background ===
By the middle of the 18th century, the land on which it stands belonged to Francisco Machado das Neves, a wealthy merchant from the town, whose daughter Maria Rosa de Figueiredo das Neves (1761-1826) married Domingos José Cardoso de Macedo (1733-1796), a nobleman with a coat of arms from José I of Portugal (16-11-1770).

=== Construction and aftermath ===
The exact date of its construction is unknown, as is the author's name. All that is known is that Domingos José Cardoso de Macedo lived there in 1788. He was succeeded by his son, Domingos Cardoso de Macedo (1780-1849), the last Captain Major of Guimarães (1813), who married Luísa Rosa Araújo Martins da Costa (1775-1854). This couple is responsible for the construction of the upper floor, above the cornice of the noble floor. On the death of the captain-major, this house was left to his wife, who in her will bequeathed it to her niece and sister-in-law, D. Luísa Ludovina Araújo Martins da Costa. While he was still alive, he gave it to his son (in 1866), Luís Cardoso Martins da Costa Macedo (1836-1919), 1st Count of Margaride.

Although the family owned the Margaride estate, it was to the Casa do Carmo that successive generations had emotional ties. This was the space where the family and social life took place, making it Guimarães' “viewing room”, where kings, princes, high-ranking Church dignitaries, ministers of state and aristocrats were received. On his death, his third son, Luís Cardoso de Macedo Martins de Menezes (1871-1945), married to D. Júlia Leonor Pinheiro Lobo Machado, succeeded him at Casa do Carmo by amicable sharing. In 1925, his first child, Maria Amália Ana Júlia Cardoso de Macedo de Menezes, was born and inherited with her Casa do Carmo siblings.

In 2015, in order to preserve, safeguard and publicise the memory of the Count of Margaride, his family and the Casa do Carmo, a deposit contract was signed with the Municipality of Guimarães, through the Alfredo Pimenta Municipal Archive, for the documentation of this house, finalized in 2019.

It is inserted in the World Heritage Site of the Guimarães Historic Centre since 2001 and was heavily renovated between 2014 and 2020.
