= Sviack =

Village in Grodno Region, Belarus

Sviack Свяцк
- Village
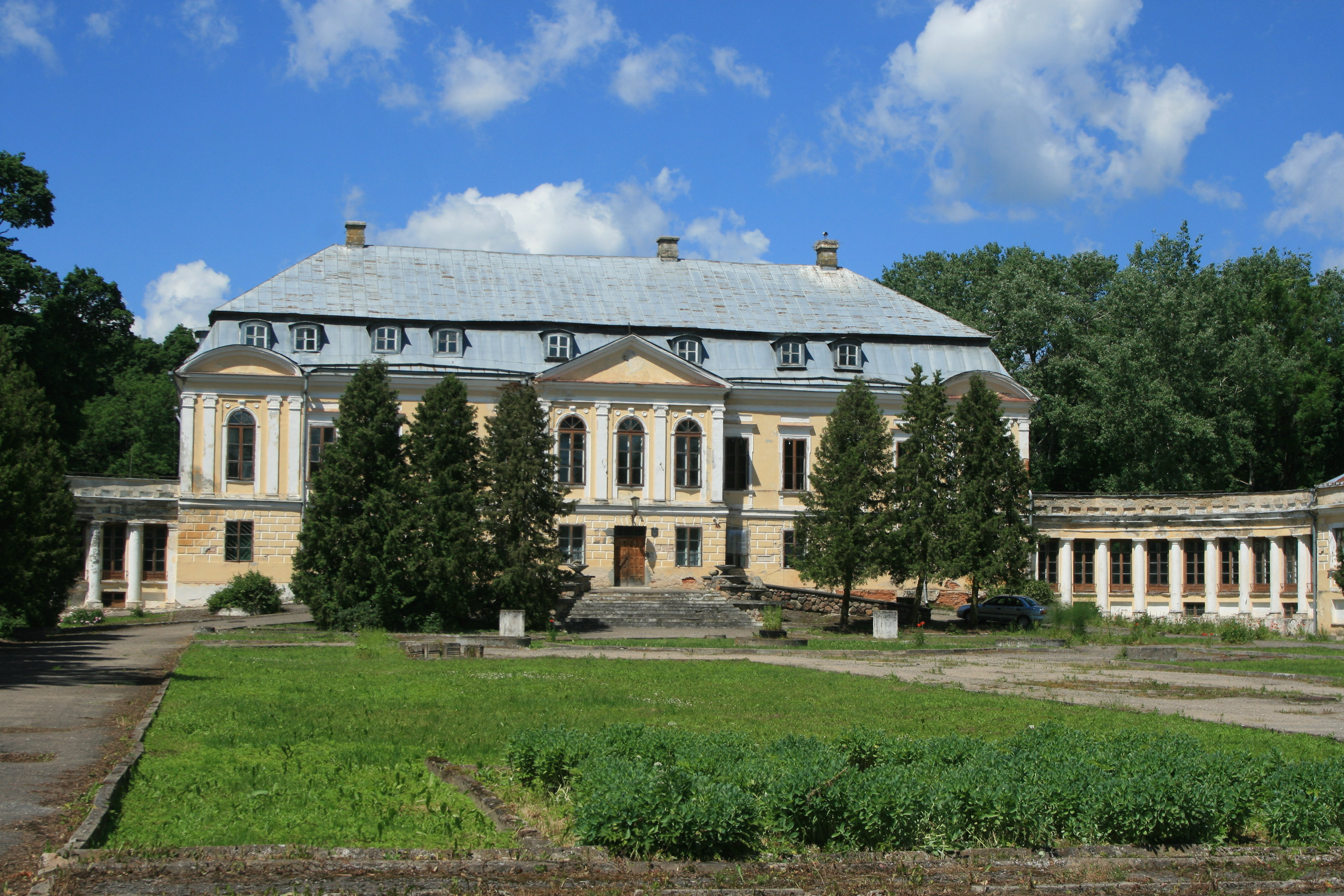
- Wołłowicz Palace

- Location within Belarus
- Coordinates: 53°47′53″N 23°39′52″E
- Country: Belarus
- Region: Grodno Region
- District: Grodno District
- Time zone: UTC+3 (MSK)

Sviack (Belarusian: Свяцк, Polish: Świack or Świack Wielki) is a village in Grodno District, Grodno Region, in western Belarus.

The local landmark is the Baroque palace of the Wołłowicz family.

== History ==
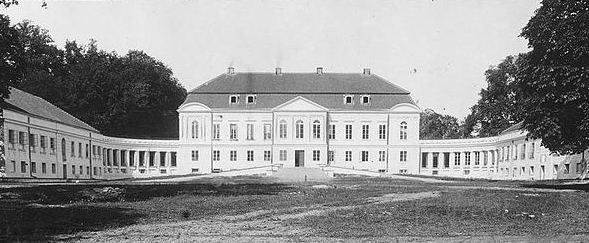
Palace in 1933

In the 18th century and early 19th century, it was a private village of the Wołłowicz family. The family founded a palace and park ensemble with an English landscape garden, orangery and a horse stud of Count Michał Wołłowicz.

In the interwar period, Świack Wielki, as it was known in Polish, was administratively located in the Augustów County in the Białystok Voivodeship of Poland. According to the 1921 census, Świack Wielki had a population of 94, entirely Polish by nationality and Catholic by confession.

Following the invasion of Poland in September 1939, the village was first occupied by the Soviet Union until 1941, then by Nazi Germany until 1944, and then re-occupied by the Soviet Union, which eventually annexed it from Poland in 1945.
