= Leitmeritz concentration camp =

Concentration camp

Coordinates: 50°32′28″N 14°06′44″E

Leitmeritz
- subcamp
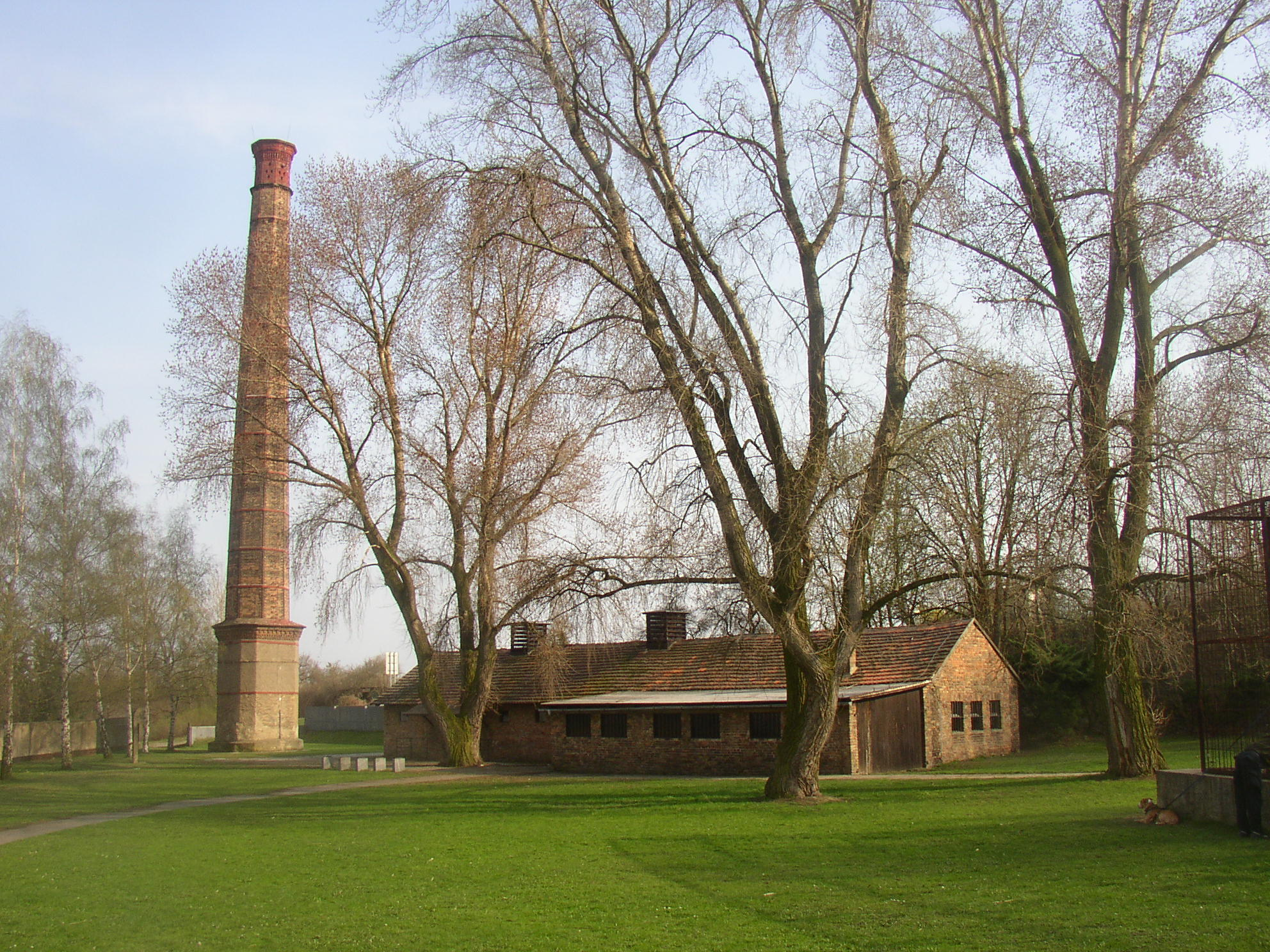
- Former crematorium
- Location: Leitmeritz, Reichsgau Sudetenland (now Litoměřice, Czech Republic)
- Operated by: Nazi Germany
- Companies involved: Auto Union (now Audi), Osram, others (Note: Companies involved included Fuchs & Co. Cottbus, Siemens-Schuckertwerke A. G. Teplitz-Schönau, Siemens-Halske A. G. Dresden, Wolfferts & Wittmer Berlin, Fritz Pollems K. G. Berlin, Dyckerhoff & Widmann Dresden, Polensky & Zöllner Driesen Nm., Alwin Böhme & Sohn Leipzig, Oberschlesische Baugesellschaft m.b.H. Kattowitz, Josef Kargel Reichenberg, Ferngas A. G. Teplitz-Schönau, Wiener Baugesellschaft m.b.H. Dniepropetrowsk, Paul Schreck K. G. Halle und Robert Kieserling Hamburg.)
- Operational: 24 March 1944 – 8 May 1945
- Inmates: Poles were the largest group
- Number of inmates: 9,000 (maximum, April 1945); 18,000 (total)
- Killed: 4,500
- Liberated by: German surrender
- Website: www.gedenkstaette-flossenbuerg.de/en/history/satellite-camps/pottenstein-1-3-2-14-15

Leitmeritz was the largest subcamp of the Flossenbürg concentration camp, operated by Nazi Germany in Leitmeritz, Reichsgau Sudetenland (now Litoměřice, Czech Republic). Established on 24 March 1944 as part of an effort to disperse and increase war production, its prisoners were forced to work in the caverns Richard I and II, producing Maybach HL230 tank engines for Auto Union (now Audi) and preparing the second site for intended production of tungsten and molybdenum wire and sheet metal by Osram. Of the 18,000 prisoners who passed through the camp, about 4,500 died due to disease, malnutrition, and accidents caused by the disregard for safety by the SS staff who administered the camp. In the last weeks of the war, the camp became a hub for death marches. The camp operated until 8 May 1945, when it was dissolved by the German surrender.

== Establishment ==
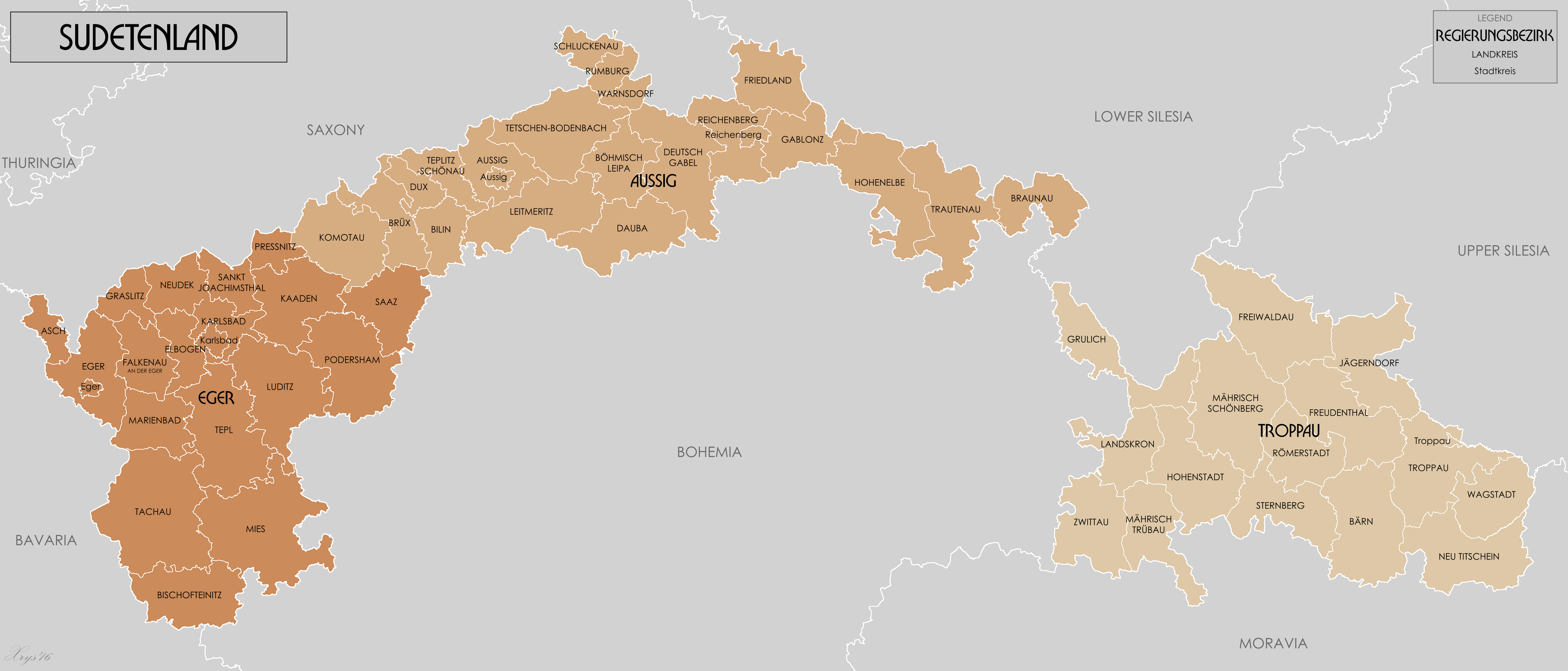
Location of Leitmeritz in Reichsgau Sudetenland.
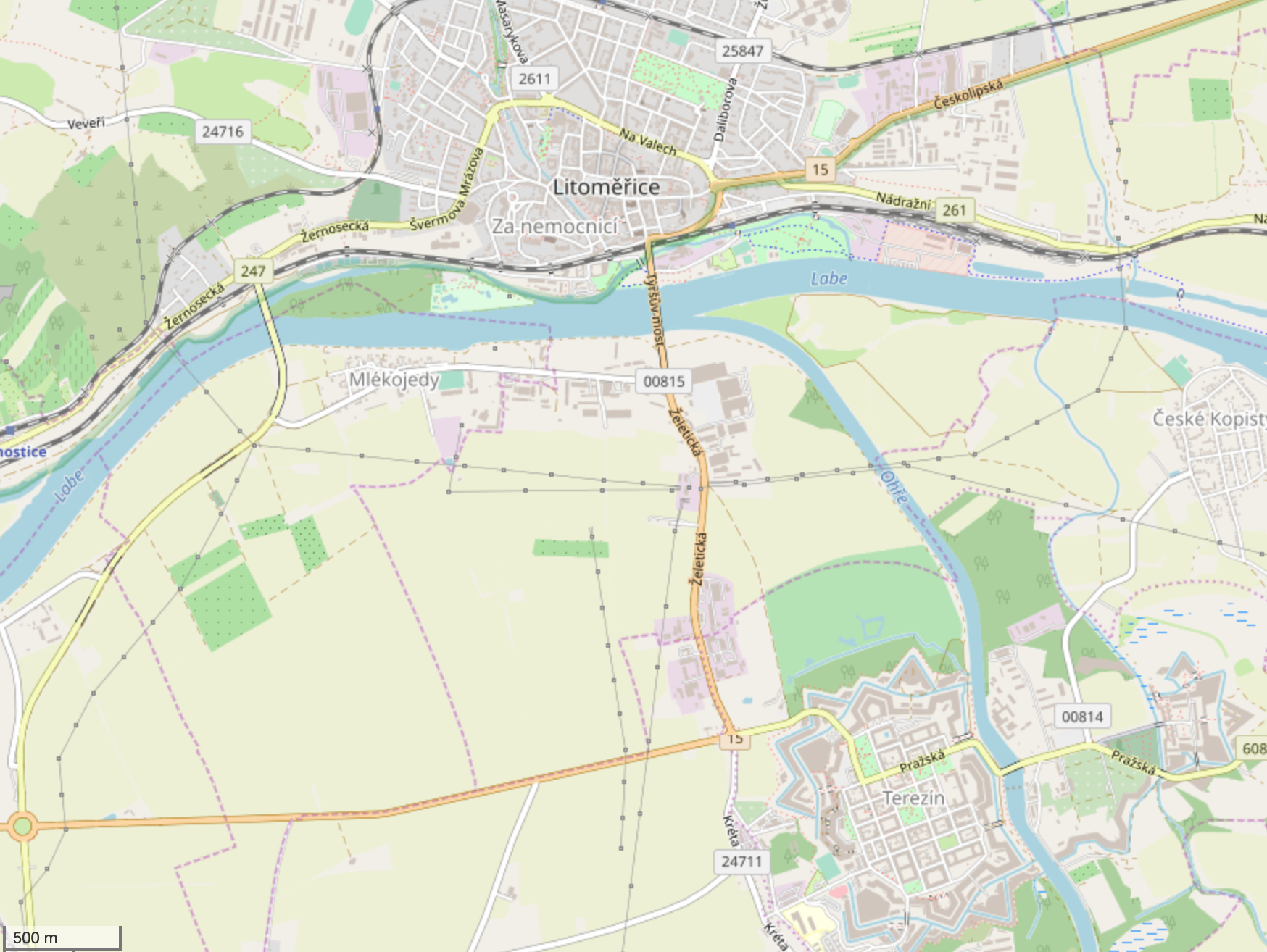
Leitmeritz and Theresienstadt on opposite sides of the Elbe; Small Fortress is on the right of the Eger; the Main Fortress on the left of the river housed the ghetto.

During the last year of the war, the concentration camp prisoner population reached its peak. The SS deployed hundreds of thousands of prisoners on war-related forced labor projects, including some of the most important to the war effort. In the meantime, many war factories had been bombed by the Allies, leading to the decision to disperse production. In 1943, the Auto Union factory in Chemnitz-Siegmar was ordered to be turned over to the production of Maybach HL230 tank engines, much in demand due to attrition on the Eastern Front. By late 1943, Hermann Göring (head of the Four Year Plan for war production, which involved mass forced labor) was planning to disperse the Maybach production from the Chemnitz plant to an underground factory under Radobýl Mountain just west of the town of Leitmeritz (now Litoměřice in the Czech Republic). Although there was an existing quarry, the facility had to be expanded in order to accommodate planned spaces for production and assembly several kilometers long. The site was located in Reichsgau Sudetenland, a territory of Czechoslovakia that had been annexed to Germany in 1938 following the Munich Agreement.

The largest subcamp of Flossenbürg concentration camp, Leitmeritz was one of the largest of the subcamps in the Sudetenland, whose remote location was favored for armaments production because it was not easily accessible to Allied bombers. Official names for the camp included "SS Kommando B 5", "Außenkommando Leitmeritz" and "Arbeitslager Leitmeritz". The camp was located west of downtown Leitmeritz, 5 kilometres (3 mi) distant from Theresienstadt Ghetto in the Protectorate of Bohemia and Moravia, a transit ghetto for Jews.

The camp was established by a transport of 500 men from Dachau concentration camp, who arrived at nearby Theresienstadt Small Fortress on 24 or 25 March 1944. Due to the lack of accommodation at the work site, they stayed at the Small Fortress (temporarily a Flossenbürg subcamp) until June. The Small Fortress was 7 kilometres (4 mi) away from the Leitmeritz camp site. From 27 March, they went each day to work in Leitmeritz. By early April, there were also 740 civilian workers, mostly skilled, and 100 prisoners were sent back to Dachau.

== Slave labor ==
In May 1944, the authority SS-Führungsstab (SS Leadership Staff) B 5, under the authority of SS magnate Hans Kammler, was created to oversee the forced labor projects at Leitmeritz. The companies involved, Auto Union and Osram, worked closely with both the SS-Führungsstab B 5 and the Reich Ministry of Armaments and War Production. The SS shell company, Mineral-Öl – Baugesellschaft m.b.H., set up to subcontract construction tasks, hired many enterprises from Germany, the Sudetenland and the Protectorate for various roles involving the camp. There was continual conflict between the SS and the companies because the goal of terrorizing and killing prisoners by extermination through labor was incompatible with the aim of securing the highest production possible. Whether they were working on the camp or underground, prisoners were not given appropriate equipment and even the most basic safety precautions were not followed. Many prisoners died in accidents due to these deliberately murderous working conditions. Almost every day, the tunnels suffered collapses; 60 prisoners died in just one such incident in May 1944.

=== Richard I ===
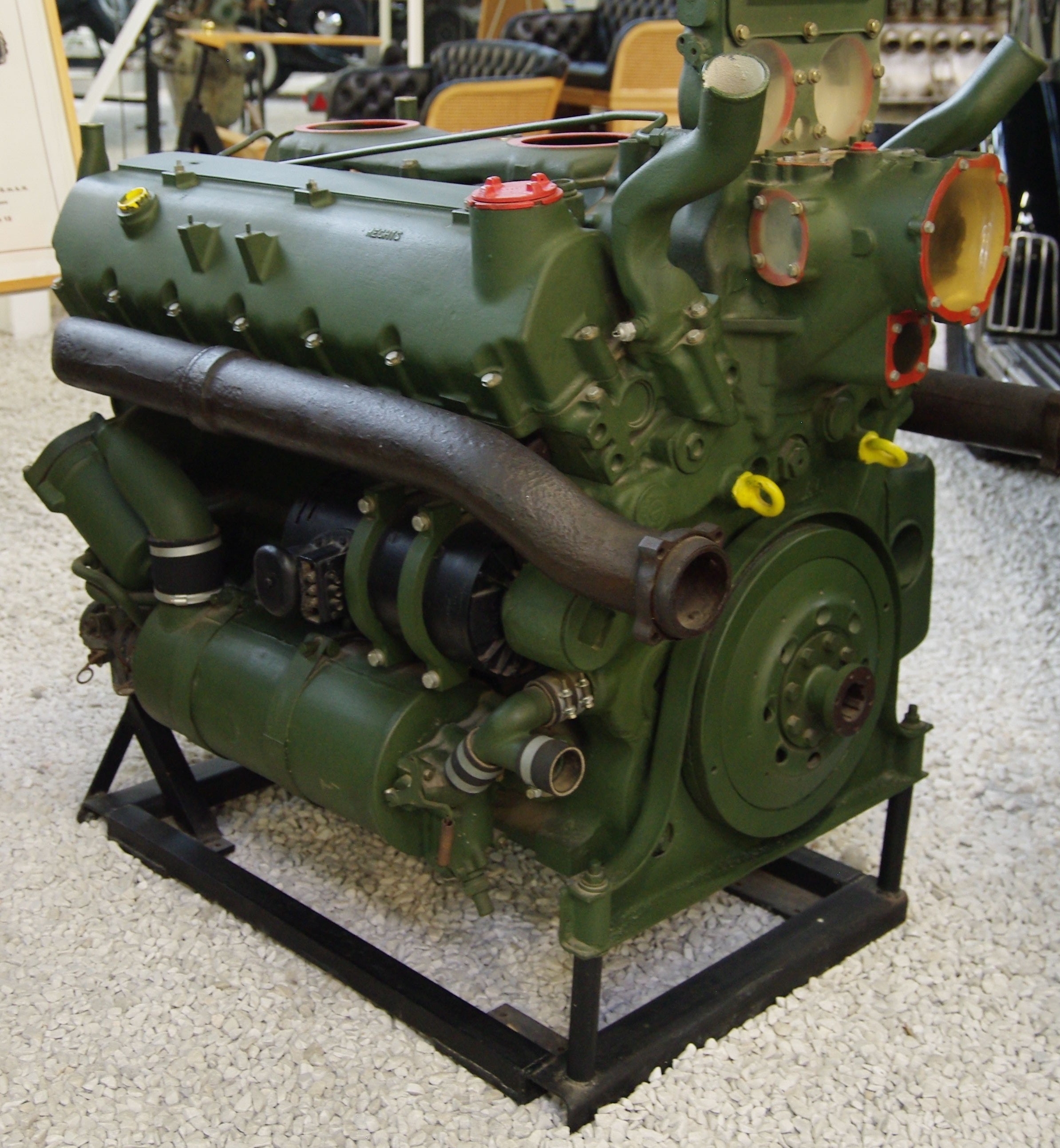
Maybach HL230 tank engine

The estimated cost of establishing Maybach production at Leitmeritz was 10 to 20 million Reichsmarks, equivalent to US$2.5–5 million at the time or $46–91 million in 2025 dollars. In early April 1944, the SS' goal was to begin production of the engines by July, which would have required 3,500 prisoners. However, the SS withdrew from the project—possibly because it was unwilling to accept the responsibility for a risky project—and it was taken over by Amt des Generalbevollmächtigten für Regelung der Bauwirtschaft (GB-Bau, "Office of General Representative for Regulation of the Construction Industry"), part of the Reich Ministry of Armaments and War Production. On 30 April, Hitler ordered that the dispersal to Leitmeritz be expedited because the Maybach plant in Friedrichshafen had been bombed by the Royal Air Force on the night of 27–28 April. From early May, the SS took over the project again.

On 11 September 1944, the Auto Union plant in Chemnitz-Siegmar was bombed. Between 25 September and 30 October, the two most important production lines of components—cylinder heads and crankcases—were transferred to the underground factory at Leitmeritz, comprising 180 machines in total. From 3 November, entire Maybach HL230 engines were manufactured in Leitmeritz; the first was completed on 14 November. The production lines were manned by selected skilled prisoners whose detachment was known as Elsabe AG. The lack of air circulation in the underground factory exacerbated the illness and exhaustion of many inmates and rusted the production machines, causing many of the completed products to fail quality control. In February, the command made efforts to improve the conditions for Elsabe prisoners in order to reduce death rates. The prisoners were housed separately in a warehouse with washrooms and given increased rations of food, while they did not have to participate in as many roll calls. Production at Richard I continued until 5 May 1945.

=== Richard II ===
On 15 May 1944, the Reich Ministry of Armaments and War Production decided to use Leitmeritz to expand the production of tungsten and molybdenum wire and sheet metal produced by Osram's Berlin factory. For this, 15,000 square metres (160,000 sq ft) of underground floor space was required as well as 300 civilian workers and 600 prisoners. The Hamburg company Robert Kieserling was contracted to construct this space. The cover name of Osram operating in Leitmeritz was Kalkspat K.G., which was responsible for machinery, power, access roads, and accommodation for civilian workers. Production was scheduled to begin by the end of 1944, but none ever took place because Osram executives recognized the hopelessness of the war situation.

== Command ==
This first commandant, SS-Hauptscharführer Schreiber, arrived with a contingent of 10 SS men who accompanied the transport. Schreiber was replaced by SS-Hauptscharführer Erich von Berg within a few months. The third commandant, SS-Obersturmführer Völkner, tried to improve conditions for prisoners but was replaced in November by SS-Hauptsturmführer Heiling, who had the most brutal reputation of the SS leaders. From February 1945, SS-Untersturmführer Benno Brückner was the commandant. The Schutzhaftlagerführer of the camp had the greatest control over camp conditions. All three of them—SS-Hauptscharführer Willi Czibulka in 1944, Kurt Panicke through March 1945 and SS-Oberscharführer Karl Opitz—had a reputation for arbitrary cruelty. Supervising prisoners in their barracks was the responsibility of the block leaders, while the Labor Operations Department (commanded by SS-Unterscharführer Tilling and later SS-Unterscharführer Piasek) oversaw labor deployment. The Political Department was headed originally by SS-Rottenführer Willi Bacher and later by SS-Rottenführer Hans Rührmeyer. SS-Unterscharführer Hans Kohn initially commanded the supply department. In 1945, Kohn was put in charge of the prisoners' kitchen and SS-Oberscharführer Günter Schmidt and SS-Scharführer Eduard Schwarz succeeded him.

There was a separate command for SS-Führungsstab B 5, headed first by SS-Obersturmführer Werner Meyer, and from November 1944 SS-Sturmbannführer Alfons Kraft. Initially, the camp was guarded by thirty Luftwaffe guards, who reported to the Fighter Staff command in Nordhausen. The first commander of the guard was Emanuel Fritz, a former prosecutor from Vienna, who was replaced by Hauptmann Jelinek in mid-1944 and SS-Oberscharführer Edmund Johann in November. As the camp expanded, the number of Luftwaffe guards increased to as many as 300, who had been seconded from Vienna, Leipzig and Buchenwald. Guards who shot a prisoner were rewarded with leave and a commendation.

== Prisoners ==
By August 1944, there were more than 2,800 prisoners, which increased further to 5,000 by November. In April 1945, the population peaked at 9,000, nearly as many as were held in the Flossenbürg main camp. An estimated 18,000 people passed through the camp. The plurality of prisoners came from Flossenbürg (3,649); large numbers also came from Gross-Rosen (3,253), Auschwitz II-Birkenau (1,995), and Dachau (1,441). In March and April 1945, 2,000 people were deported to Leitmeritz from various Flossenbürg subcamps and 800 from subcamps of Buchenwald due to the advance of Allied armies. Leitmeritz began as a male camp, but from February to April 1945, 770 women also were imprisoned at the site, to work for Osram. An unusually high number of the prisoners, about 3,600 or 4,000, were Jews, most of whom were from Poland and the first of whom arrived on 9 August 1944. By country of origin, the largest groups were Poles (almost 9,000), Soviet citizens (3,500), Germans (950), Hungarians (850), French (800), Yugoslavs (more than 600) and Czechs (more than 500).

Transports to Leitmeritz, 1944-45 (Note: Source: Benešová 1995, pp. 233–234 Transports with fewer than 200 prisoners are not listed. Also not listed are evacuation transports that occurred in late April and early May.)
Date of arrival	Source	Number of deportees	Notes
24 March	Dachau	500	
31 June	Gross-Rosen	1,202	
25 July	Dachau	400	Included many Slovenian partisans
9 August	Flossenbürg	1,038	Polish Jews
4 September	Flossenbürg	1,296	Poles
17 September	Auschwitz II-Birkenau	1,495	Warsaw Uprising detainees
18 October	Flossenbürg	300	
28 October	Auschwitz II-Birkenau	500	Warsaw Uprising detainees
25 November	Flossenbürg	248	For Richard I
8 December	Flossenbürg	452	For Richard I
6 January	Kaufering	835	Jews
27 January	Dachau	206	
14 February	Gross-Rosen	2,051	Part of the evacuation of the camp; 68 prisoners died during the transport.
23 February	Königstein	565	
2 April	Zwickau	416	
6 April	Ravensbrück	300	Women
9 April	Buchenwald	1,473	
14 April	Dresden	200	
16 April	Chemnitz	370	Women
20 April	Gröditz	325	

== Conditions ==
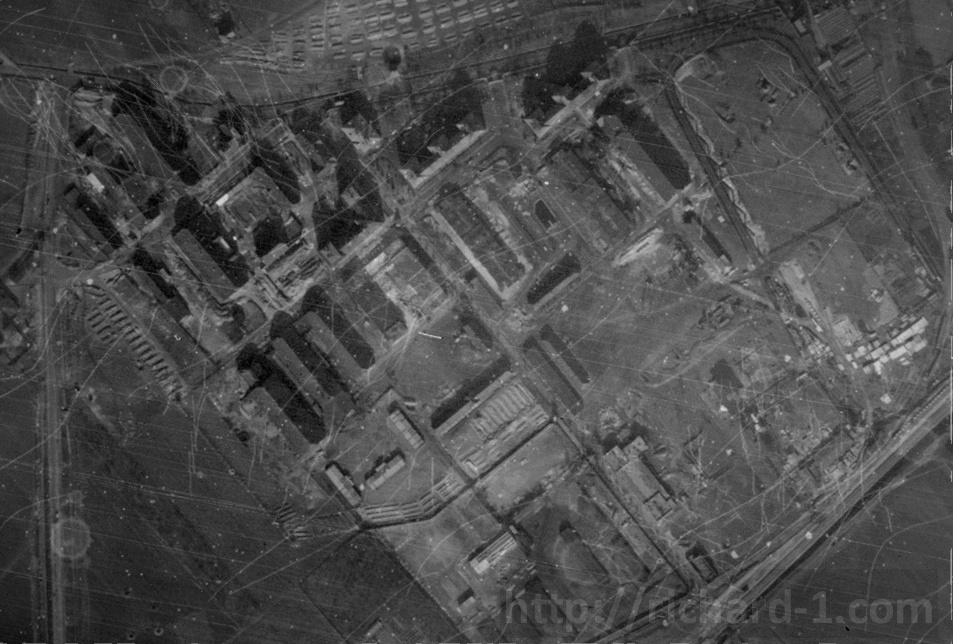
Aerial photograph of the concentration camp barracks, 1945

The camp itself was located in a former Czechoslovak Army base. The SS guards and administrators as well as civilian laborers lived in the original soldiers' quarters, while prisoners were warehoused in the former stables, indoor riding arena, and storage depot, which were surrounded by a double barbed-wire fence and seven watchtowers. During mid-1944, the prisoners renovated the buildings in order to house more prisoners. A kitchen was set up in June 1944 and the infirmary was built around September. Additional barracks were built during the winter of 1944–1945 to accommodate increases in the prisoner population. By April 1945, seven additional barracks had been built for prisoners while an additional two were planned. The capacity was 4,300 men—which had already been exceeded—and 1,000 women in the separate women's camp.

Despite the continual increase in the number of prisoners, not enough accommodation was built, resulting in serious overcrowding and major problems with hygiene. Rations of food were completely inadequate. The rate of infectious disease, especially tuberculosis, was very high; at the end of 1944 many prisoners were x-rayed, showing that nearly half had the disease. By February 1945, a third of prisoners were incapacitated by disease, preventing sufficient prisoners from being mustered for slave labor. As a result, the companies constantly had to train new prisoners. Initially the prisoners were grouped in quarters based on the transport they arrived in; later they were organized by work group but not nationality as was typical elsewhere.

Prisoners called it the "death factory"; about 4,500 prisoners died at the camp. According to records, 150 people died through November 1944 and after that the mortality rate climbed, with 706 deaths in December, 934 in January 1945, and 862 in February. The increase in the death rate coincided with the arrival of Jewish prisoners. The Warsaw Uprising detainees were specifically targeted by the kapos and SS guards; a third did not survive. Victims were first cremated at the Theresienstadt crematorium at the Small Fortress. Due to the large number of deaths, another crematorium was built at Leitmeritz in April. The remains of 66 others, who had been buried in seven mass graves, were exhumed in 1946; another 723 bodies were found in a 40-metre (130 ft) long anti-tank ditch. After the war, these victims were reburied in the cemetery at Theresienstadt Small Fortress. Before the evacuation of the camp, 3,869 prisoners, primarily those unable to work, were sent to other camps, including 1,657 to Flossenbürg and its subcamps and 1,200 (suffering from typhus and dysentery) to Bergen-Belsen concentration camp. Their fate is not known.

== Dissolution ==
In the last week of the war, Leitmeritz was a hub for many death marches. Thousands of prisoners arrived at the camp, where there was no space for them. Some prisoners had to sleep outside while others, during the last few days of the war, slept in the tunnels. Prisoners were bundled into almost 100 transports and deported south into Bohemia. The number of deaths during the evacuation is unknown. About 1,222 prisoners, mostly Jewish men—some from Leitmeritz itself, others who had arrived after death marches from elsewhere—ended up in Theresienstadt Ghetto. However, some of them may have been sent there after liberation. Ninety-eight died in Theresienstadt.

After Flossenbürg main camp was liberated by the United States Army on 23 April 1945, Leitmeritz continued to operate, administering nearby concentration camps such as Lobositz. On the afternoon of 5 May, Panicke summoned the prisoners to announce that the war was over and they would be released. Between 6 and 8 May, many prisoners received certificates for their release. The camp was officially dissolved by the German Instrument of Surrender on 8 May. On 9–10 May, 5th Guards Army of the Red Army arrived at the site, finding 1,200 sick prisoners who had been left behind. The Czechoslovak militia guarded the site until 16 May, when it was taken over by the Red Army. Parts of the Soviet and Czech medical missions to Theresienstadt were diverted to Leitmeritz. The last prisoners were repatriated in July 1945.

== Aftermath ==
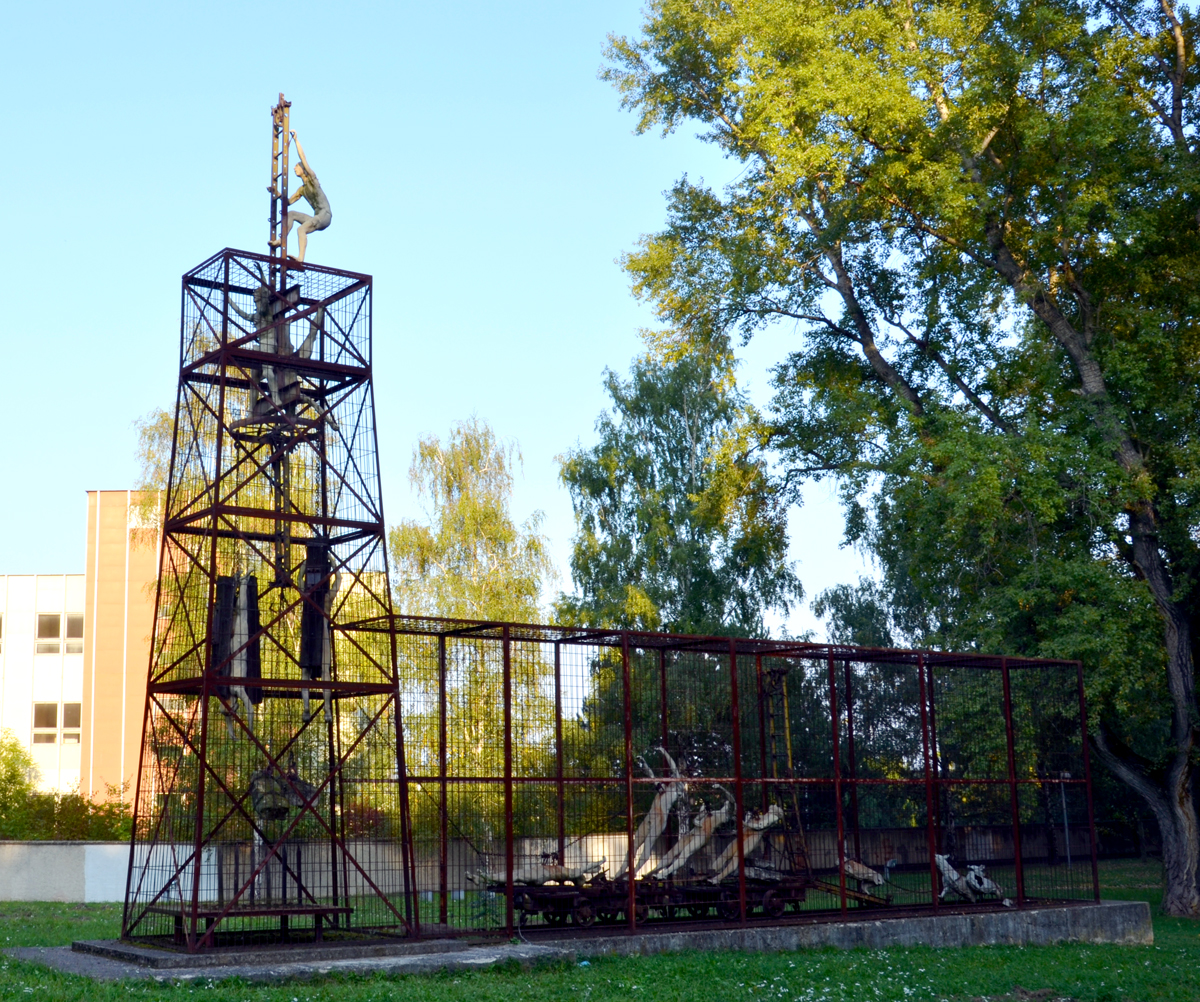
Memorial to the victims of the camp, designed by Jiří Sozanský

The Elsabe production lines were dismantled and shipped to the Soviet Union as war reparations, while the barracks were returned to use by the Czechoslovak Army, and used until 2003. The crematorium is the only part of the former camp open to the public. Nearby, a memorial to the victims of the camp designed by the Czech artist Jiří Sozanský, was unveiled in 1992. The memorial and the surviving archives of the former camp are administered by the Terezín Memorial. Leitmeritz is known as "one of the most infamous and best researched Flossenbürg subcamps"; the Terezín Memorial has sponsored research into the camp's history. In 2014, Audi (the successor to Auto Union) released a report by Audi historian Martin Kukowski and Chemnitz University of Technology academic Rudolf Boch that it had commissioned into its activity during the Nazi era. According to the report, the company bore "moral responsibility" for the 4,500 deaths that occurred at Leitmeritz.

In 1946, former Schutzhaftlagerführer Karl Opitz was convicted of responsibility for the execution of thirty prisoners and sentenced to life in prison by a Czechoslovak court. In 1974, former guard Henryk Matuszkowiak was convicted and sentenced to death in Poland for committing fourteen murders at Leitmeritz. In 2001, Julius Viel was convicted by a German court of murdering seven Jewish prisoners in an anti-tank trench in the spring of 1945, despite having claimed to be in Vienna when the murders were committed. The information which led to his conviction was given by a Hungarian-born former SS man, Adalbert Lallier. More than 360 witnesses were interviewed by the prosecutors.
