= Radobýl =

Basalt hill in the Central Bohemian Uplands, Czech Republic

Coordinates: 50°31′48″N 14°05′40″E

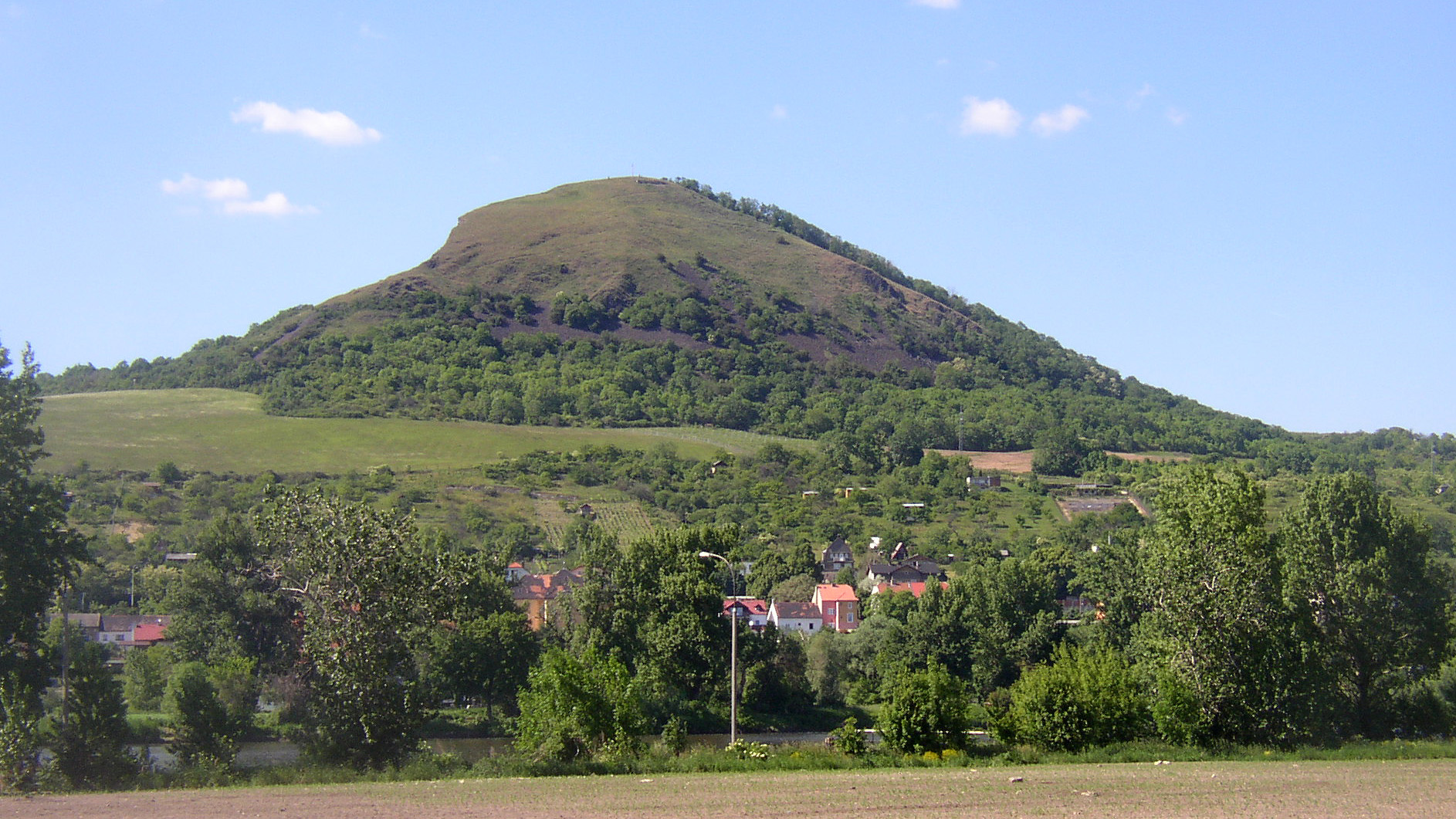
Radobýl from south.

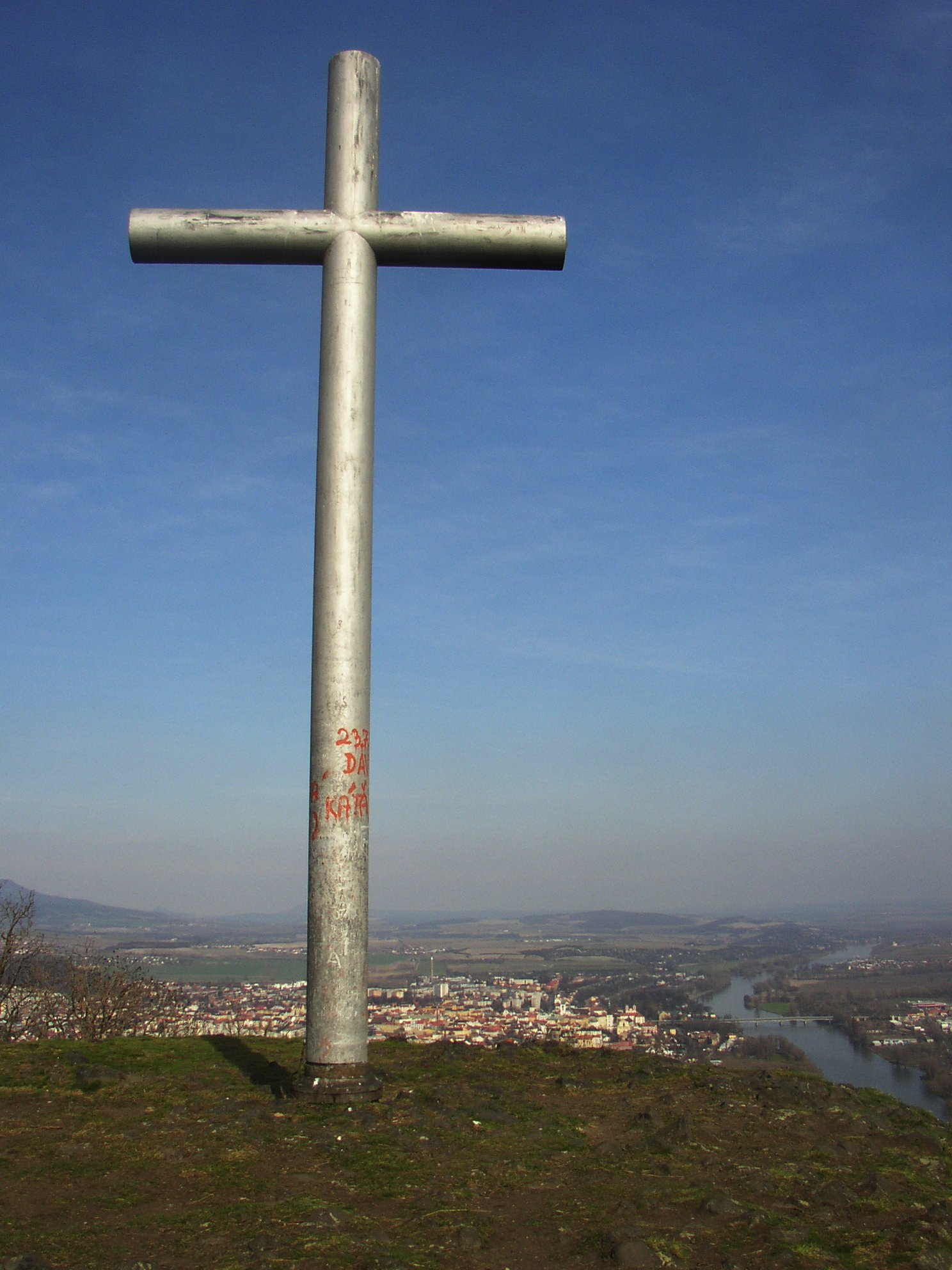
Cross on the summit, Litoměřice and Elbe River in the background.

Radobýl (German: Radebeule) is a basalt hill in Central Bohemian Uplands in the Czech Republic. It has an altitude of 399 m (1,309 ft) and is located in the Ústí nad Labem Region, on the border between the territories of Žalhostice and Litoměřice. It rises above village of Žalhostice on right bank of the Elbe River. Part of the hill with abandoned basalt quarry and rich rock steppe flora is under protection as Radobýl Nature Monument. The hill is a popular hiking destination. From the huge metallic cross (erected in 1991) on the bare summit there is almost 360-degrees panoramic view of central part of the Central Bohemian Uplands, Litoměřice, Terezín and Lovosice.

In 1944–1945, the Richard I and II subterranean factories were excavated under Radobýl by forced laborers of Leitmeritz concentration camp.
