= Žalhostice =

- Municipality
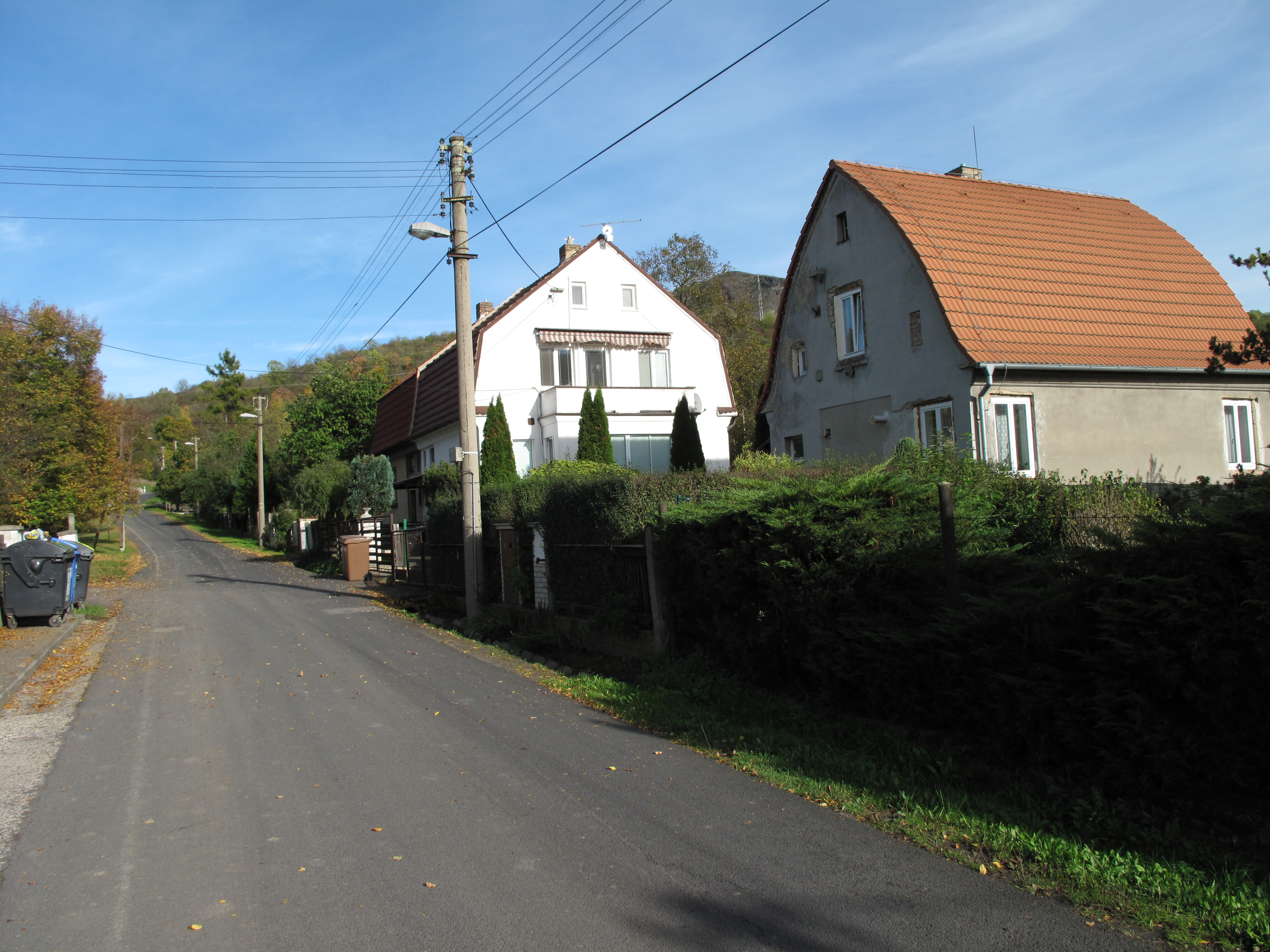
- A street in Žalhostice

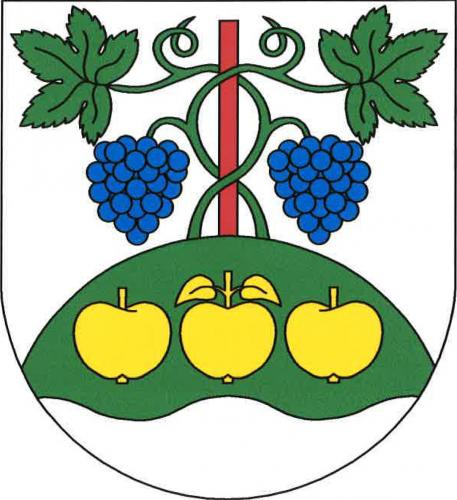
- Flag Coat of arms

- Location in the Czech Republic
- Coordinates: 50°31′23″N 14°5′29″E
- Country: Czech Republic
- Region: Ústí nad Labem
- District: Litoměřice
- First mentioned: 1319

Area
  - Total: 2.33 km^{2} (0.90 sq mi)
- Elevation: 151 m (495 ft)

Population (2026-01-01)
  - Total: 593
  - Density: 255/km^{2} (659/sq mi)
- Time zone: UTC+1 (CET)
  - Summer (DST): UTC+2 (CEST)
- Postal code: 411 01
- Website: www.zalhostice.cz

Žalhostice (German: Czalositz, Tschalositz) is a municipality and village in Litoměřice District in the Ústí nad Labem Region of the Czech Republic. It has about 600 inhabitants.

Žalhostice lies approximately 3 kilometres (2 mi) west of Litoměřice, 15 km (9 mi) south of Ústí nad Labem, and 55 km (34 mi) north-west of Prague.

== Demographics ==
Historical population
Year	Pop.	±%
1869	247	—
1880	298	+20.6%
1890	332	+11.4%
1900	502	+51.2%
1910	719	+43.2%
1921	861	+19.7%
1930	928	+7.8%
1950	709	−23.6%
1961	752	+6.1%
1970	685	−8.9%
1980	557	−18.7%
1991	487	−12.6%
2001	474	−2.7%
2011	527	+11.2%
2021	505	−4.2%
Source: Censuses
