= Litoměřice horní nádraží railway station =

Railway station in Litoměřice, Czech Republic

Coordinates: 50.5408°N 14.1314°E

Litoměřice horní nádraží
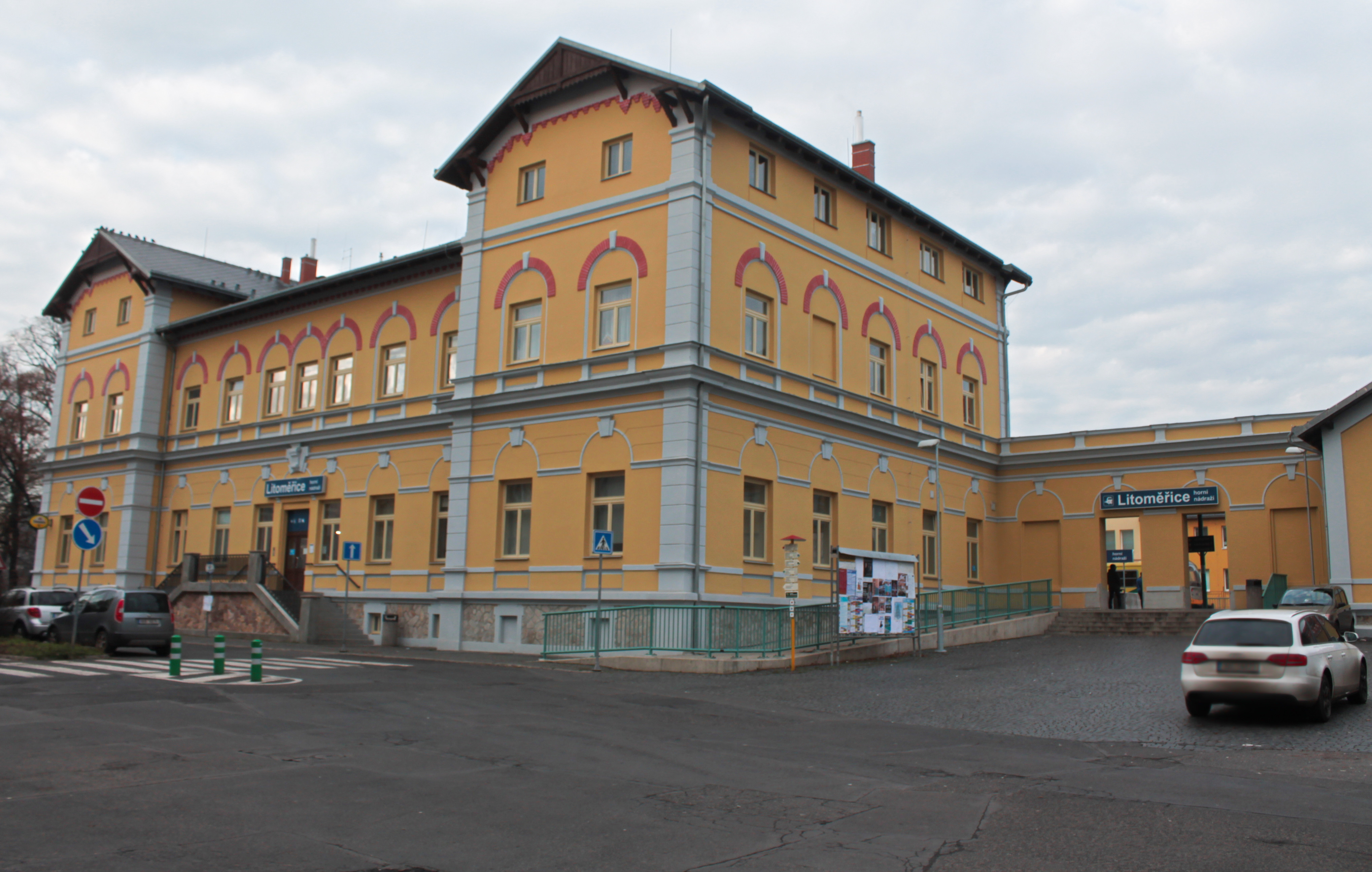

General information
- Location: Liberecká 736/1, 41201 Litoměřice-Předměstí; Czech Republic
- Elevation: 182 m (597 ft)
- Owner: Správa železnic
- Lines: U10; U11; T4
- Platforms: 3
- Tracks: 3
- Train operators: České dráhy; AŽD Praha
- Connections: Local bus services

Construction
- Structure type: At-grade
- Accessible: yes

Other information
- Status: Staffed

History
- Opened: 12 October 1898
- Former names: Leitmeritz Bahnhof der ATE, Leitmeritz-Teplitzer Bahnhof, Litoměřice-teplické nádraží
Location

Litoměřice horní nádraží (shortened to Litoměřice horní n.) is a railway station in Litoměřice, Czech Republic. The station is located north of the city centre and serves regional trains to Most, Postoloprty and Česká Lípa on lines U10 and U11.

== History ==
The station was opened on 18 October 1898 by the Ústí nad Labem–Teplice railway company under the name Leitmeritz Bahnhof der ATE, or Litoměřice-teplické nádraží. It had a single through line and 7 sidings, as well as several goods sheds and an engine shed. Some sidings later fell out of use as traffic through the station declined.

The station underwent a major overhaul in 2015, which included a renovation of the station building, ticket offices, public toilets and restaurant. The track layout has been changed significantly, with the old sidings and platforms being taken up. The station now features one terminating and two through lines, platforms with level boarding, wheelchair ramps, as well as proper lighting and a public information system.

== Track layout and services ==
Platform 1 is a terminating bay platform serving hourly trains to Lovosice, Most and Třebívlice operated by AŽD Praha using their RegioSprinter diesel multiple units, as well as a weekend tourist service to Chotiměř.

Platform 2 sees hourly services to Postoloprty and Česká Lípa hl. n. operated by the national train company České dráhy, which becomes bi-hourly on weekends.

Platform 3 is only used when more than 2 trains are present at the station at the same time.
