= Reichsgau Sudetenland =

Subdivision of Nazi Germany, 1939 to 1945

- Gau of Nazi Germany
- 1939–1945
- Flag Coat of arms

- Map of the Gaue of Germany in 1944. The Reichsgau Sudetenland is in blue.
- Capital: Reichenberg
- Area
  - Coordinates: 50°46′N 15°4′E
  - 1939: 22,608.23 km^{2} (8,729.09 sq mi)
- Population
  - 17 May 1939: 2,943,187
- Government
- Gauleiter
  - 1938–1945: Konrad Henlein
- History
  - Munich Agreement: 30 September 1938
  - Reichsgau established: 1 May 1939
  - German surrender: 8 May 1945
Preceded by	Succeeded by
First Czechoslovak Republic	Third Czechoslovak Republic
- Today part of: Czech Republic

The Reichsgau Sudetenland was an administrative division of Nazi Germany from 1939 to 1945. It comprised the northern part of the Sudetenland territory, which was annexed from Czechoslovakia according to the 30 September 1938 Munich Agreement. The Reichsgau was headed by the former Sudeten German Party leader, now Nazi Party functionary Konrad Henlein as Gauleiter and Reichsstatthalter. From October 1938 to May 1939, it was the regional subdivision of the Nazi Party in that area, also under Henlein's leadership. The administrative capital was Reichenberg (Liberec).

== History ==
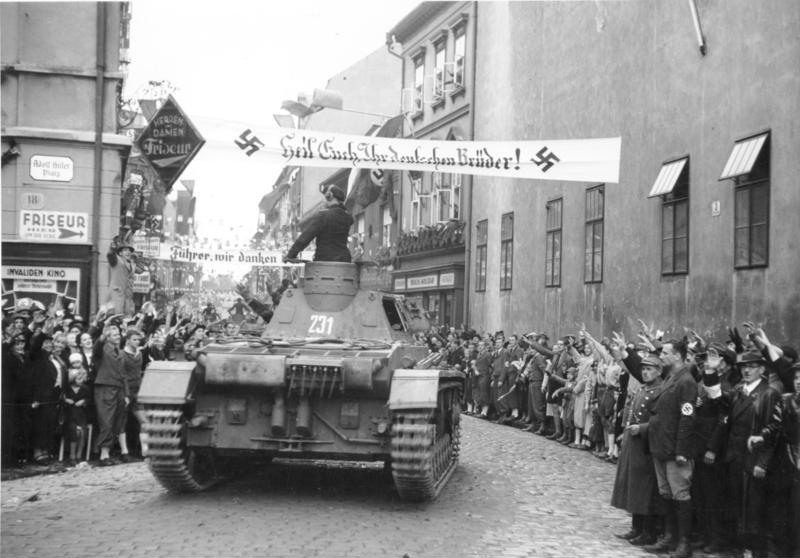
Ethnic Germans in Komotau, Sudetenland, greet German soldiers with the Nazi salute, 1938

In the course of the German occupation of Czechoslovakia, on 30 September 1938 the Heads of Government of the United Kingdom, France, Italy, and Germany signed the Munich Agreement, which enforced the cession of the Sudetenland to Germany. Czechoslovak representatives were not invited. On 1 October, invading Wehrmacht forces occupied the territory. The new Czechoslovak-German borders were officially fixed in a treaty on 21 November 1938. In consequence, the Czechoslovak Republic lost about one third of its population, its most important industrial area, and also its extended border fortifications.

Initially, the German Army (Heer) established a civil administration under occupational law. On 30 October 1938, Konrad Henlein was appointed Gauleiter and Reichskommissar of Sudetenland. The Sudeten German Party was merged into the Nazi Party, all other political parties were banned. The Czech population had to accept German citizenship or were expelled and forcibly relocated to the Czechoslovak rump state, which itself from 15 March 1939 was occupied by Germany and incorporated as the "Protectorate of Bohemia and Moravia".

After the proclamation of the Protectorate of Bohemia and Moravia, the Reichsgau was formally established by law on 25 March 1939, in effect from 15 April, borders were adjusted and the administrative structure was fixed on May 1. Konrad Henlein was named Reichsstatthalter. The administrative capital was Reichenberg (Liberec). Smaller areas in the east, such as the Hlučín Region, were ceded to the Prussian Province of Silesia, while the western and southern Sudetenland territories were attached to the Bavarian Gau Bayreuth as well as to the Austrian Reichsgaue Oberdonau and Niederdonau.

After Germany's defeat in World War II, Czechoslovakia was re-established as an independent state and the Sudeten German population was expelled.

The Theresienstadt concentration camp was located in the Protectorate of Bohemia and Moravia, near the border to the Reichsgau Sudetenland. It was designed to concentrate the Jewish population from the Protectorate and gradually move them to extermination camps and also held Western European and German Jews. While not an extermination camp the harsh and unhygienic conditions still resulted in the death of 33,000 of the 140,000 Jews brought to the camp while a further 88,000 were sent to extermination camps and only 19,000 survived.

== Gauleiter ==
- Konrad Henlein: 30 October 1938 to 8 May 1945

== Administration ==
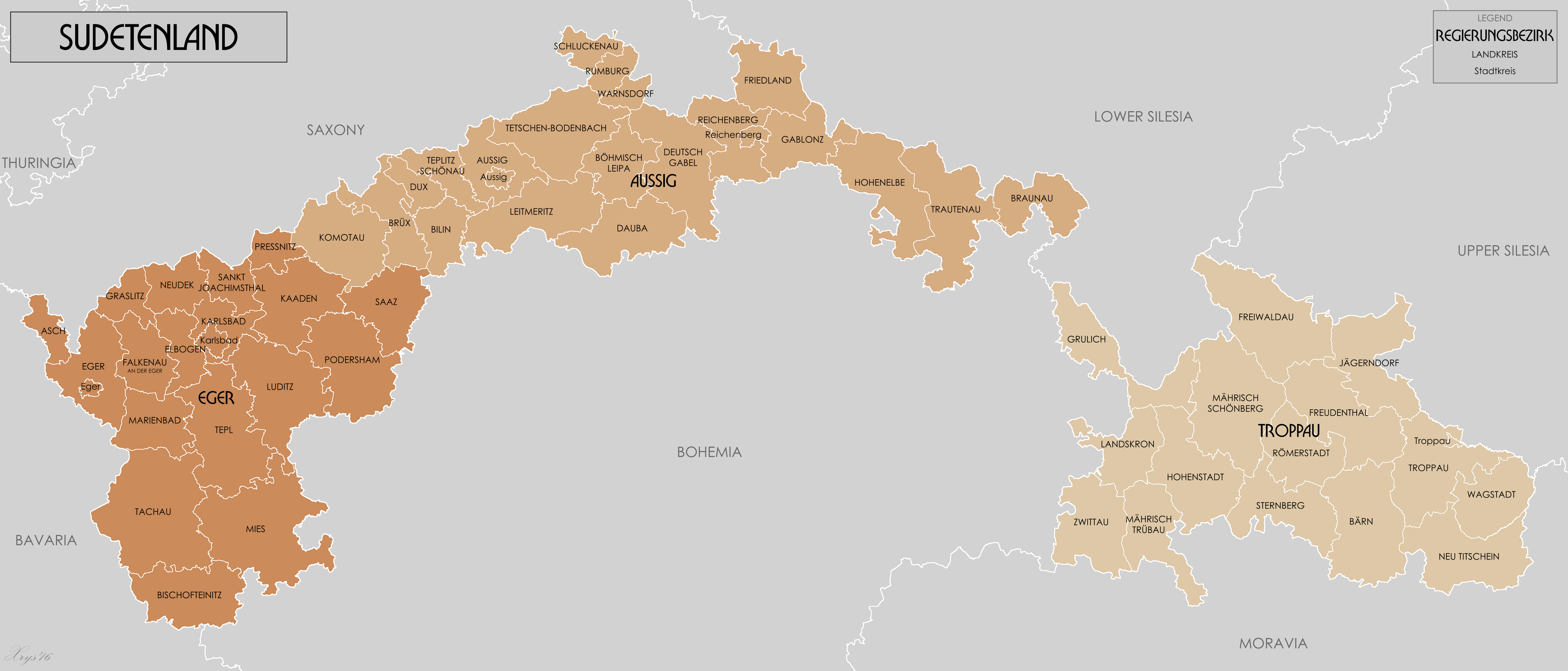
Administrative divisions

The Reichsgau Sudetenland was divided into three Regierungsbezirke. These were subdivided into 58 districts (Kreise), largely corresponding to the former Czechoslovak okresy:

=== Regierungsbezirk Aussig ===
President:

- 1939–1945: Hans Krebs

==== Urban districts ====
1. Aussig
2. Reichenberg

==== Rural districts ====
1. Aussig
2. Bilin
3. Böhmisch Leipa
4. Braunau
5. Brüx
6. Dauba
7. Deutsch Gabel
8. Dux
9. Friedland (Isergebirge)
10. Gablonz an der Neiße
11. Hohenelbe
12. Komotau
13. Leitmeritz
14. Reichenberg
15. Rumburg
16. Schluckenau
17. Teplitz-Schönau
18. Tetschen-Bodenbach
19. Trautenau
20. Warnsdorf

=== Regierungsbezirk Eger ===
President:

- 1939–1940: Wilhelm Sebekovsky
- 1940–1945: Karl Müller

==== Urban districts ====
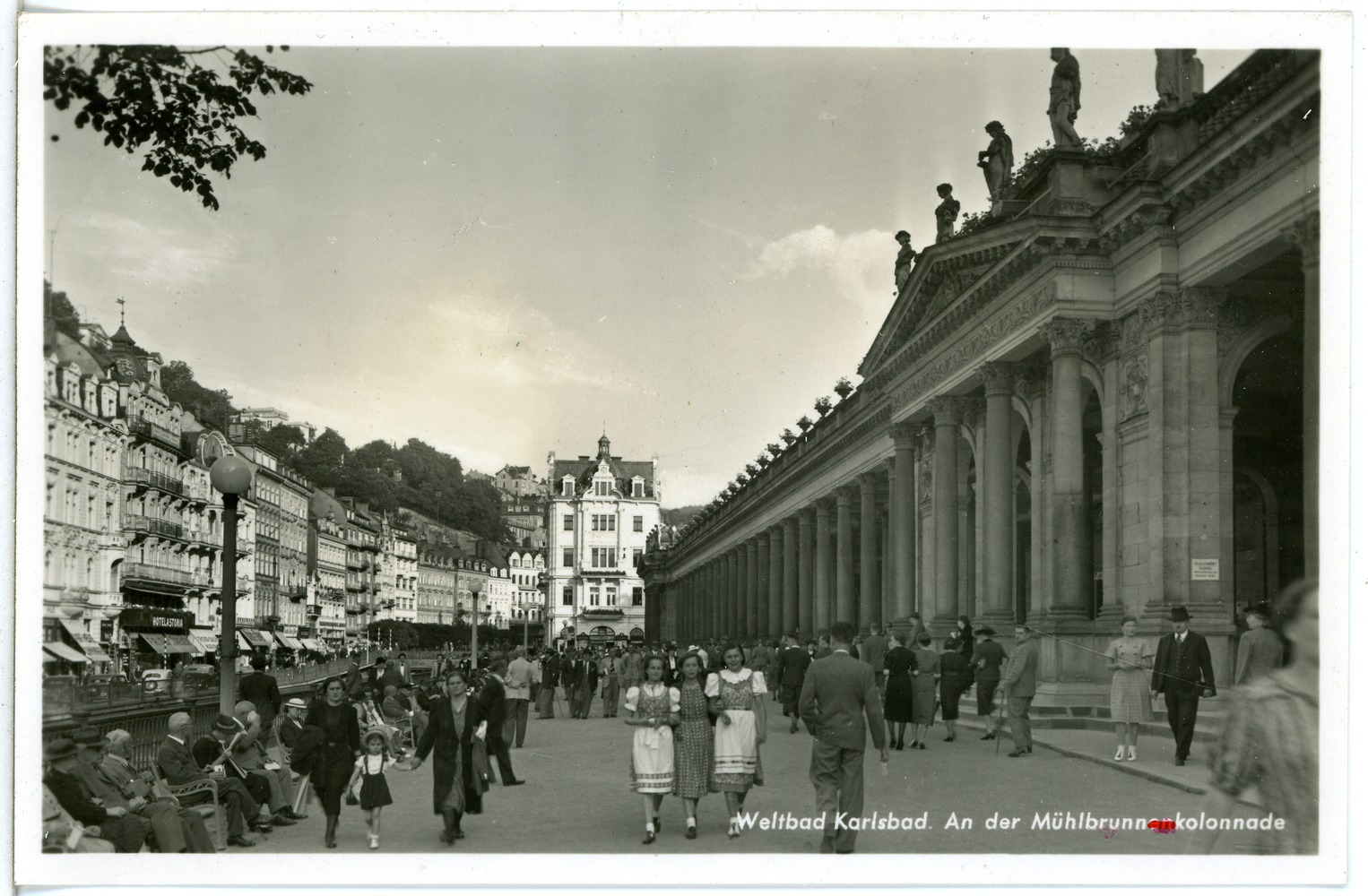
Karlsbad in 1941

1. Eger
2. Karlsbad

==== Rural districts ====
1. Asch
2. Bischofteinitz
3. Eger
4. Elbogen
5. Falkenau an der Eger
6. Graslitz
7. Kaaden
8. Karlsbad
9. Luditz
10. Marienbad
11. Mies
12. Neudek
13. Podersam
14. Preßnitz
15. Saaz
16. Sankt Joachimsthal
17. Tachau
18. Tepl

=== Regierungsbezirk Troppau ===
President:

- 1939–1943: Friedrich Zippelius
- 1943–1945: Karl Ferdinand Edler von der Planitz

==== Urban districts ====
1. Troppau

==== Rural districts ====
1. Bärn
2. Freiwaldau
3. Freudenthal
4. Grulich
5. Hohenstadt
6. Jägerndorf
7. Landskron
8. Mährisch Schönberg
9. Mährisch Trübau
10. Neu Titschein
11. Römerstadt
12. Sternberg
13. Troppau
14. Wagstadt
15. Zwittau

== See also ==
- Gauliga Sudetenland, the highest association football league in the Gau from 1938 to 1945
- The Holocaust in the Sudetenland
