= The Holocaust in the Sudetenland =

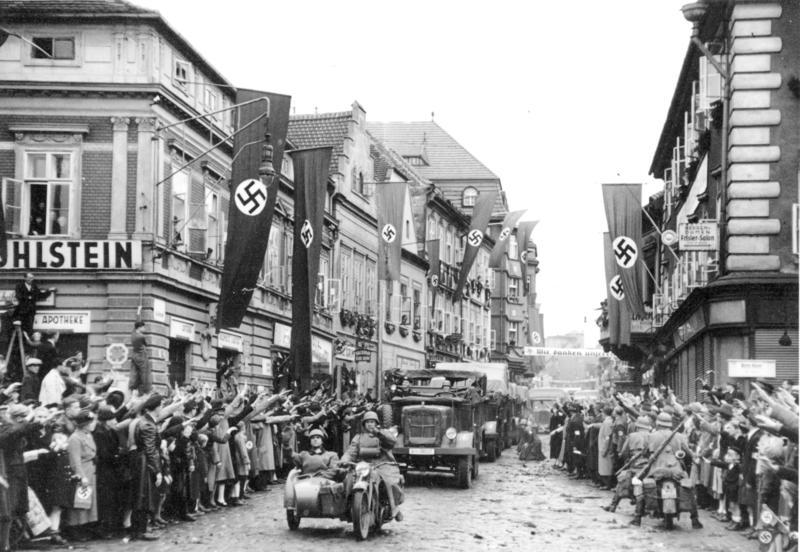
- Sudeten Germans in Saaz greet the Wehrmacht with Nazi salutes.
- Date: 1938–1945
- Location: Reichsgau Sudetenland
- Target: Jews
- Organised by: Nazi Germany

The Holocaust in the Sudetenland resulted in the flight, dispossession, deportation and ultimately death of many of the 24,505 Jews living in the Reichsgau Sudetenland, an administrative region of Nazi Germany established from former Czechoslovak territory annexed after the October 1938 Munich Agreement. Due to harassment and violence, including during Kristallnacht (9–10 November 1938), ninety percent of the Jews had already left the Sudetenland by mid-1939. The remaining Jews were subject to property confiscation and eventually deportation. During the later years of the war, tens of thousands of Jews and non-Jews were forced laborers in a network of concentration camps in the Sudetenland.

After the war, Jewish communities in the former Sudetenland suffered losses due to the discrimination against German-speaking Jews under the postwar Czechoslovak government, but were partially replenished by arrivals from Carpathian Ruthenia.

== Background ==
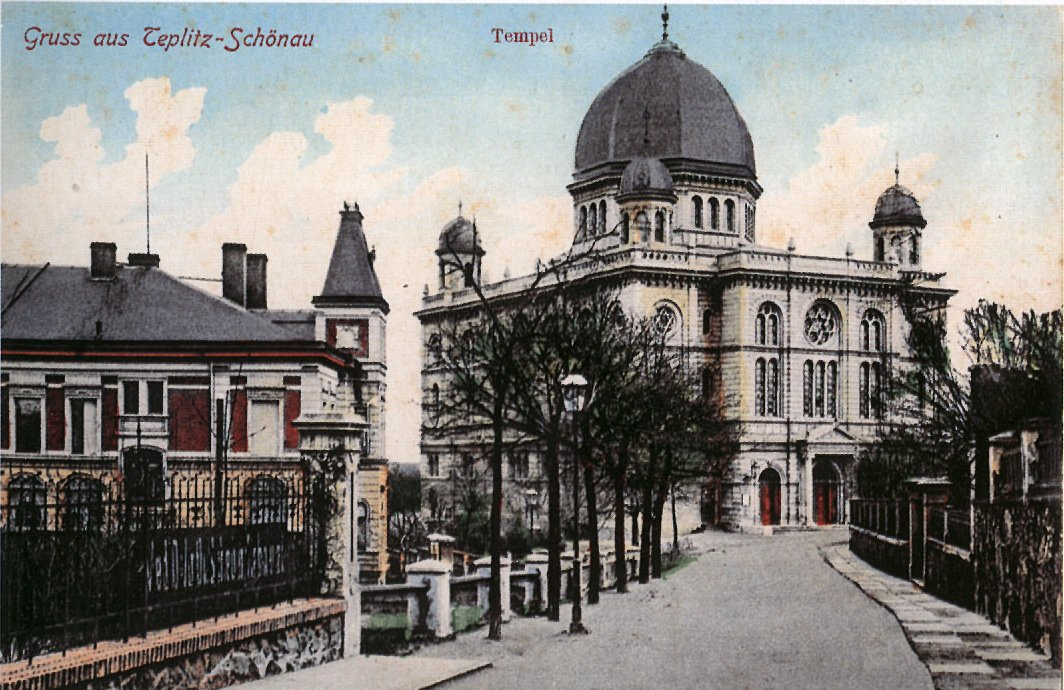
Synagogue in Teplitz-Schönau, the largest Jewish community in the Sudetenland, was destroyed during Kristallnacht.

Before 1918, the German-majority parts of the Czech lands were part of the Austro-Hungarian Empire. In the nineteenth century, the Czech National Revival agitated for autonomy for the Czech-speaking majority. Following World War I, the border Sudetenland and its German majority were denied a border poll to determine their future. Even though most Germans would have preferred union with Germany, they became part of the new country of Czechoslovakia. The Jewish population of the Sudetenland had been decreasing due to emigration and a low birth rate. In 1930, the Jewish population of the area to be annexed by Germany in 1938 was 29,045, with 24,505 in what would be the Reichsgau Sudetenland Nazi administrative region. The largest Jewish communities were Teplitz-Schönau (3,213 Jews, 10% of the population), Karlsbad (2,115, 9%), and Reichenberg (1,392, 3.6%). Jews of the Sudetenland were small businessmen and professionals; they included wealthy industrialists such as the Petschek family. While some declared Jewish nationality, nearly all spoke German as their main language and most considered themselves Germans.

Unhappy with their minority status despite relatively generous minority rights, Germans in Czechoslovakia started a movement for greater national autonomy. The resurgence of ethnic nationalism based on the idea of Volksgemeinschaft ("people's community") led to an increase in antisemitism as Jews were not deemed members of the national community. Economic difficulties in the mid-1930s caused an increase in support for the Sudeten German Party (SdP) of Konrad Henlein. A pro-Nazi party, SdP opposed liberalism, democracy, Slavs and Jews. Funded by the Nazi Party, it won two-thirds of the German vote in the 1935 Czechoslovak parliamentary election and about ninety percent in the 1938 Czechoslovak local elections. Prior to 1938, however, the SdP had emphasized the conflict between Czech and German nationalism rather than antisemitism.

== Annexation and flight ==
Partition of Czechoslovakia in 1938 and 1939

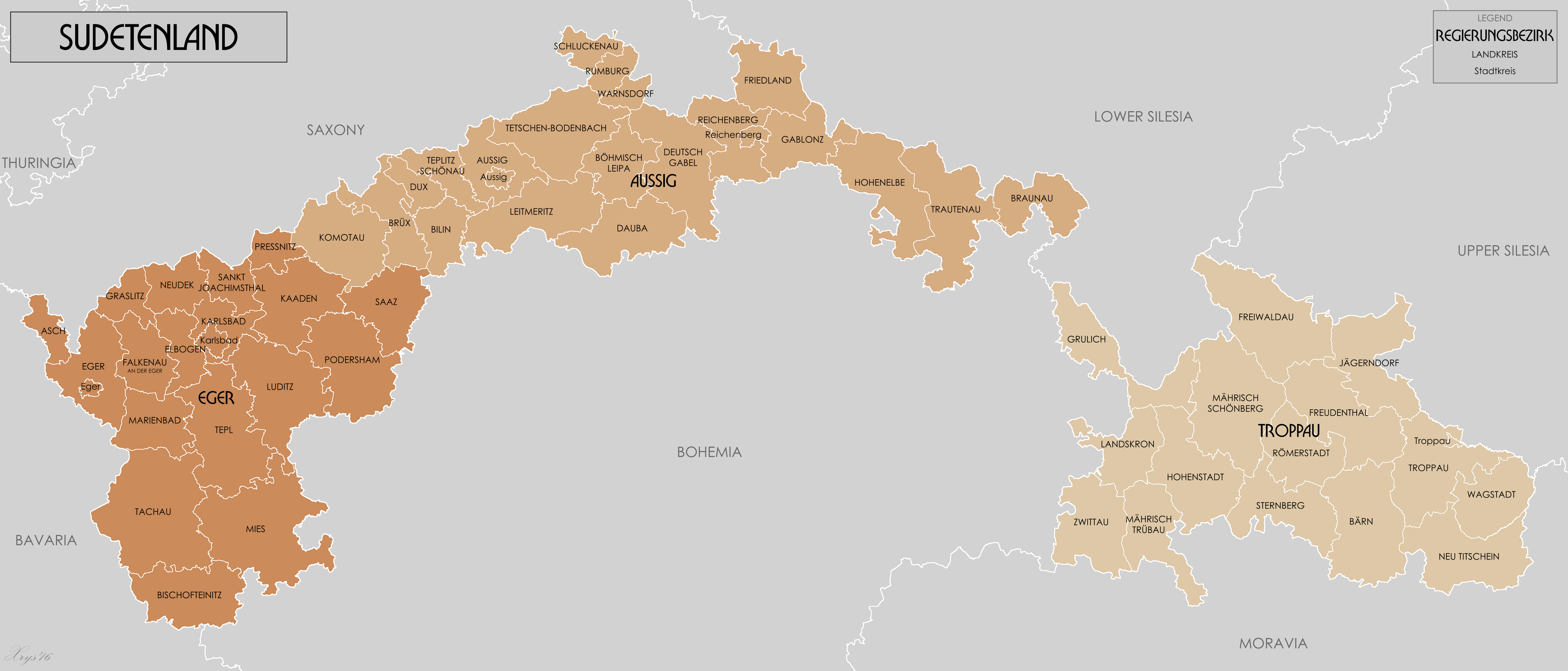
Reichsgau Sudetenland was established on some of the territory annexed by Germany in 1938.

In September 1938, Henlein formed the Sudetendeutsches Freikorps (Sudeten German Free Corps) to conduct guerrilla war against Czechoslovakia. Businesses owned by Jews and Czechs in the Sudetenland, especially Eger, Karlsbad, and Asch, were attacked by demonstrators demanding union with Germany. Heinlein's forces imprisoned 17 Jews in Marienbad, later freed by Czechoslovak forces. Death threats were made against notable Jews such as Emil Margulies of Leitmeritz. Many Jews and Czechs fled the violence: Warnsdorf and Komotau, which had hundreds of Jewish residents in the 1930 census, declared themselves "Jew-free" before the end of September. In Karlsbad 2,000 of 3,000 Jews fled to Prague. Due to the violence against Austrian Jews after the German annexation in March 1938, the Jews of the Sudetenland were aware of the dangers of Nazi rule.

On 30 September 1938, the Munich Agreement was signed without Czechoslovak participation, ceding the Sudetenland to Nazi Germany. Between 1 and 10 October, the Czechoslovak Army withdrew. The Wehrmacht—greeted by most Germans as liberators—temporarily set up a military administration, while Henlein was appointed Reichskommissar. In between the departure of the Czechoslovak authorities and the arrival of the German ones, SdP supporters and the Freikorps unleashed "unbridled terror" with acts of violence and vandalism against Jews and Czechs; Jewish businesses—especially in Aussig—were targeted again. In the wake of the German invasion force, Einsatzgruppen units followed, to become the main instrument of Nazi repression as they had done after the Anschluss, according to lists of anti-Nazis already developed by the SD (Sicherheitsdienst). The Gestapo office in Eger reported 971 arrests by 14 October, and the Karlsbad office reported 1,157 arrests by 7 November. Although Jews were not explicitly targeted as a group, many were arrested as political offenders. Many of the people arrested (10,000 by early 1939) were held in detention centers in the Sudetenland, while thousands were deported to concentration camps in Germany.

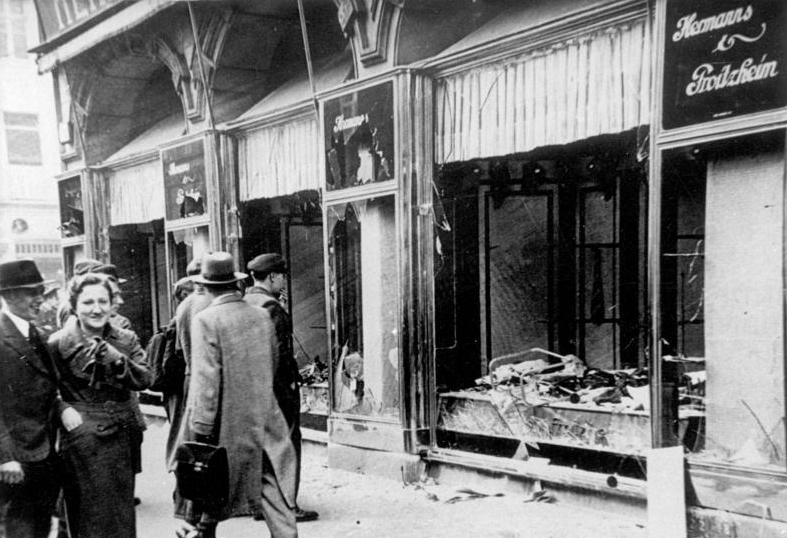
Destruction to shops in Magdeburg after Kristallnacht

Many Jews who had not already fled, often those elderly or with significant property that they did not wish to abandon, were visited by the Gestapo shortly after the German invasion and forced to sign papers promising to leave within six days. The authorities were encouraged to search the residence of all Jews for "subversive material" and "stolen goods". Many Jews fled with nothing more than personal valuables and sometimes machines from factories that they owned. German authorities sought to use the refugees, who mostly fled to the rump Czechoslovak state, to destabilize that state and increase antisemitism among Czechs. Some refugees were sent back by the Czechoslovak authorities and had to wait in the no-man's land for their cases to be resolved, despite the fact that the Munich Agreement entitled them to retain their Czechoslovak citizenship.

During Kristallnacht (9–10 November 1938), Jews and Czechs were attacked and their stores raided. Most synagogues—including those in Teplitz-Schönau, Reichenberg, Troppau, Jägerndorf, Falkenau and Brüx—were destroyed; others, such as those in Aussig and Tetschen, were damaged with smashed windows. Jewish communities were billed for the cost of demolishing the synagogues that were damaged beyond repair. Perpetrators included SdP members, SS (Schutzstaffel), SA (Sturmabteilung), and local Germans. The number of Jews who were killed is unknown. In the wake of the pogrom, more Jews were arrested, detained either in temporary "wild camps" or deported to the Old Reich. (Note: The territory of Nazi Germany in 1938, before its annexations.) At least 12,000 Jews had fled the Sudetenland by the beginning of November. By May 1939 only 2,363 "full Jews" (ten percent of the pre-war population) remained in the Reichsgau Sudetenland, along with 2,183 first-degree Mischlinge and 1,396 second-degree Mischlinge. (Note: According to the Nuremberg Laws, persons with two Jewish grandparents were considered Geltungsjuden (lit. 'Jews under the law') if they belonged to the Jewish faith after 15 September 1935, were married to a Jew as of 15 September 1935, or were offspring of Rassenschande (illegal race mixing) born after 31 July 1936. If a person had two Jewish ancestors but did not fit the above criteria, they were a Mischling (lit. 'mix-ling') of the first degree. Second-degree Mischlinge were those with one Jewish grandparent. Geltungsjuden had the same status as others deemed Jews by the Nazis, but were often protected from deportation by being a child younger than fifteen with a non-Jewish parent.) Despite the obstacles to emigration, more than half of the Jews who fled the Sudetenland eventually emigrated abroad.

On 14 March 1939, the Slovak State declared independence with German support. Carrying out plans made since October 1938, Germany invaded the Czech rump state, establishing the Protectorate of Bohemia and Moravia. Most refugees from the Sudetenland therefore fell under Nazi rule. Those who did not manage to emigrate were deported from the Protectorate, especially in the first transports to the Łódź Ghetto. A month later, Adolf Hitler signed an edict establishing the Reichsgau Sudetenland, which included the northern part of the lands annexed by Germany in 1938. Other areas were annexed to existing administrative regions of Nazi Germany, including Lower Bavaria, Oppeln (in Upper Silesia), and former Austrian areas.

== Aryanization ==
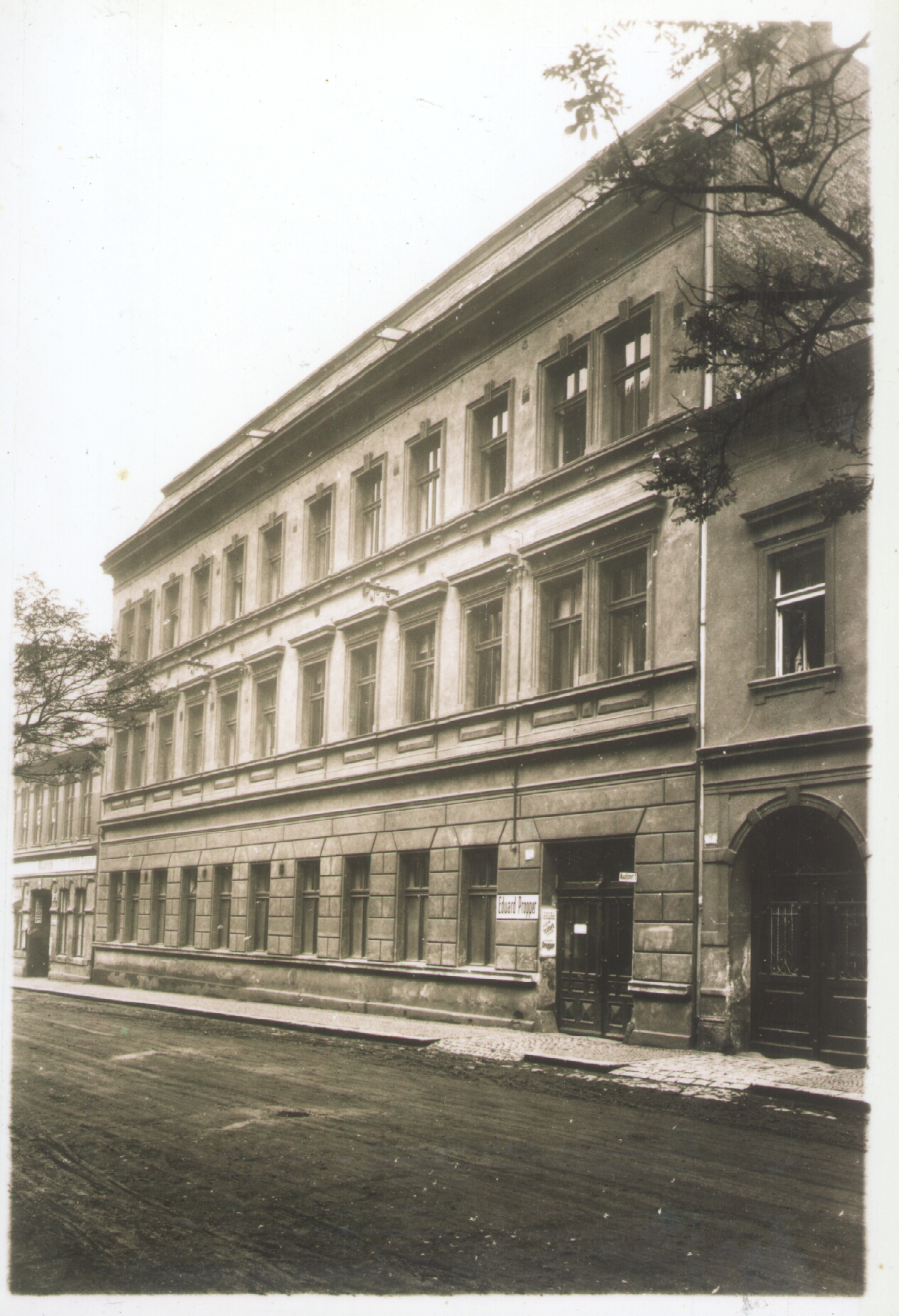
Jewish-owned factory in Teplitz-Schönau

On 14 October 1938, Hermann Göring issued an edict for the Aryanization of Jewish property, which affected the entire Reich, including the newly annexed Sudetenland. Within weeks, Jews were forbidden from raising the German flag, from working as journalists, and from operating retail stores. Following Kristallnacht, they were required to pay a 20% tax on all assets, and in December, the Nuremberg Laws were extended to the Sudetenland. Jews were required to declare their assets by 31 January 1939. In 1930, Jews had owned some four to five thousand businesses in the Sudetenland, providing employment for many residents in the region. Fleeing Jews abandoned hundreds of them, which were immediately taken over by the authorities and turned over to new owners. Nevertheless, the transition caused considerable chaos; in Teplitz-Schönau, where Jews had owned 89 of the 213 businesses, 200 stores were empty and work in most of the expropriated businesses must have ceased.

Aryanization was characterized by conflicts between local Sudeten Germans and the Reich Ministry of the Economy: the former wanted to preserve jobs at Jewish-owned factories, while the latter sought to use Aryanization in order to leverage the Sudeten economy for war production. As a result, local Germans were mostly allowed to Aryanize factories in the textile and food sectors, which were mostly outdated, while Germans from elsewhere were invited to take over factories in industries important to the war effort. This result fueled resentment to the Sudeten Germans, who had hoped to reap the profits of the expropriations, which they considered just recompense for perceived suffering under the Czechoslovak government. Despite their disappointment, however, the Sudeten Germans had benefited from Aryanization, which their widespread participation in local government had accelerated. The total annexation of the Sudetenland to the Reich and the flight of the Jewish population enabled the process to proceed faster than elsewhere, and it was mostly complete by the end of 1939. The total amount of money obtained by Aryanization was estimated at 1 billion Reichsmarks, worth around US$250 million at the time ($5.79 billion in 2025 dollars).

== Forced labor ==
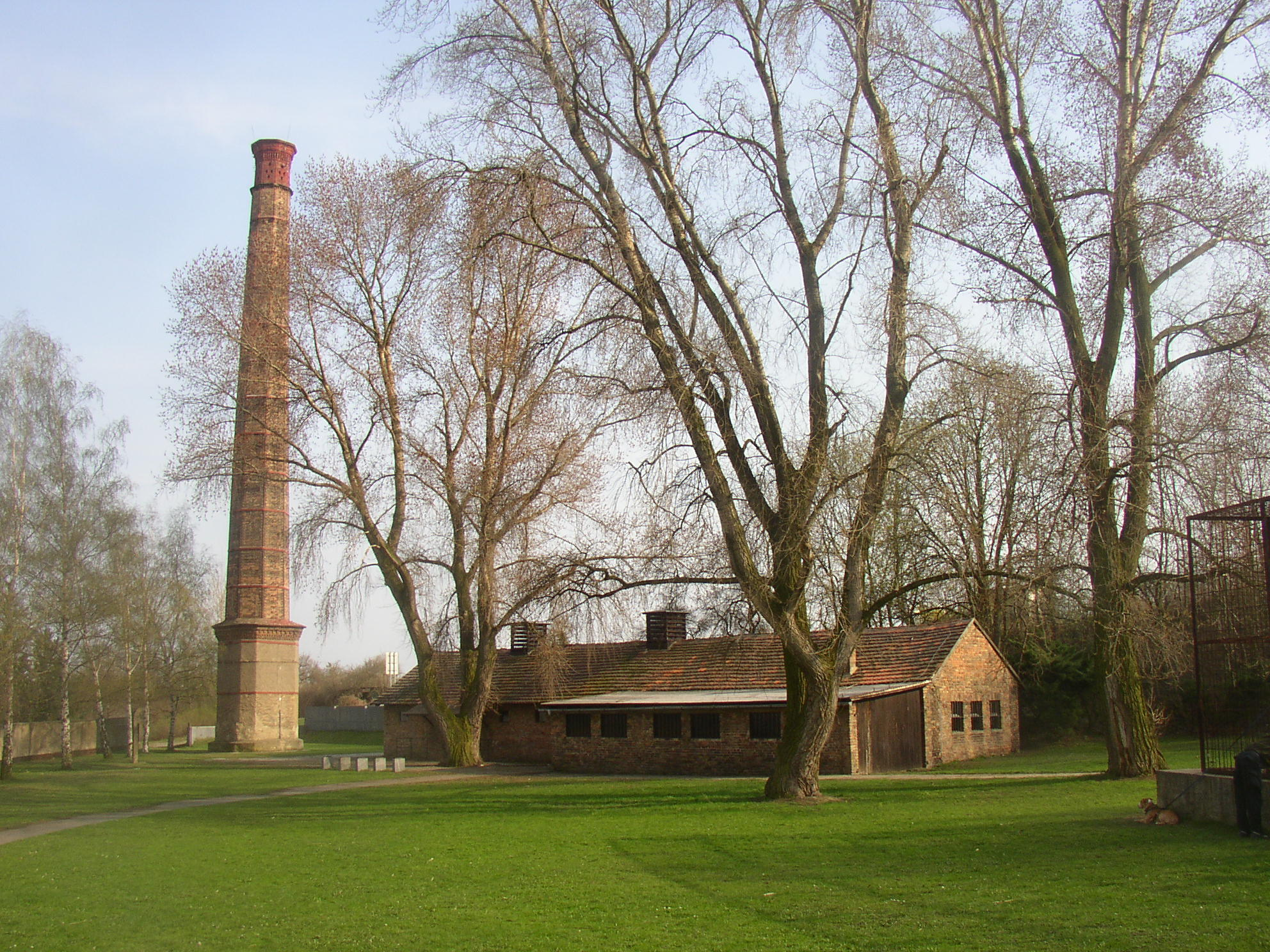
Former crematorium at Leitmeritz concentration camp

By 1939, Jews over the age of 14 were required to work at forced labor projects, even though their numbers were not enough to stem the local labor shortage. Due to low numbers, not a single forced-labor camp for local Jews was set up in the Sudetenland, despite the extensive systems that existed elsewhere. Exploitation of the forced labor of non-German Jews by Organization Schmelt became a major profit center for the SS. At the beginning of 1943, nineteen of 177 Schmelt camps were located in the Sudetenland; detainees were housed under conditions similar to those in the concentration camps. In late 1942, more than a thousand Jewish women were employed in the textile industry in Kreis Trautenau. In Postelberg, near Saatz, a forced-labor camp existed from 1943 to 1945, and in December 1944, two forced-labor camps were set up near Komotau. Both camps housed Jewish men from Prague protected from deportation by mixed marriages, the non-Jewish husbands of Jewish women from the Protectorate, and Mischlinge from the Protectorate.

In 1942, the first subcamps of Flossenbürg, Ravensbrück and Gross-Rosen were established in the Sudetenland, many of them derived from the system of Organization Schmelt. The system was greatly expanded during late 1944 because Sudetenland was one of the last areas to be relatively safe from Allied bombing and therefore favored for the relocation of war industry. In particular, it was home to many of the subcamps of Flossenbürg, which itself was just over the pre-war border in the Upper Palatinate of Bavaria. One of the largest subcamps in the Sudetenland was Leitmeritz, a subcamp of Flossenbürg organized by the Jägerstab (fighter staff) for aircraft and other armaments production. It had around 18,000 prisoners (including 3,600 Jews), 4,500 of whom died. Seven Gross-Rosen female subcamps in the Sudetenland contained 4,000 Jewish women.

Thousands of Jews arrived at these camps in the last year of the war, both Hungarian Jews deported during the summer of 1944 and other Jews from the evacuation transports from Auschwitz, Gross-Rosen, and other concentration camps in 1945. Extensive death marches took place in northern Bohemia in the last weeks of the war, delivering 12,829 prisoners to Theresienstadt from mid-April.

== Concentration and deportation ==
On 10 May 1939, a law was passed to encourage landlords to evict Jewish tenants. Later that year, the system of "Judenhäuser" (lit. 'Jew houses') was set up and eventually extended to most towns with more than a few Jews. About 100 Jews from Aussig were forced to settle in Schönwald Castle, and dozens of Jews from Leitmeritz Landkreis were moved to Dlaschkowitz Castle. As in the Old Reich, in late 1939 Jews were required to use the first names "Israel" or "Sarah", and from 1 September 1941, Jews were required to wear a yellow star. Many Jews attempted to subvert these measures, either by applying for an exception, or covering up the star. Jews were banned from traveling on trains in order to restrict their movement, and Jewish children were barred from schools. The Aryan partners in mixed marriages also endured discrimination.

By June 1940, there were 1,886 Jews in the Reichsgau, and by April 1942 this had dropped further to 1,614. Deportation began on 13 July 1942 with a transport from Aussig, later than elsewhere in the Reich. Between July and February the next year, 400 people were deported directly to extermination camps in Eastern Europe. The second wave of transports deported another 460 people to Theresienstadt Ghetto in the Protectorate, from 13 November 1942 through the end of 1944. By 1 January 1945, 382 Jews remained in Reichsgau Sudetenland: 53 in non-privileged mixed marriages, 275 in privileged mixed marriages, 52 Geltungsjuden, and two Jews with foreign citizenship. Beginning in January 1945, the Reich Security Main Office planned the deportation of these Jews; 157 were deported to Theresienstadt between 6 February and 7 March. Of the 612 Jews deported to Theresienstadt in total, 366 died and 246 survived. Of the dead, 85 were killed in Auschwitz-Birkenau, two in Bergen-Belsen, and one person at Treblinka extermination camp.

== Aftermath ==
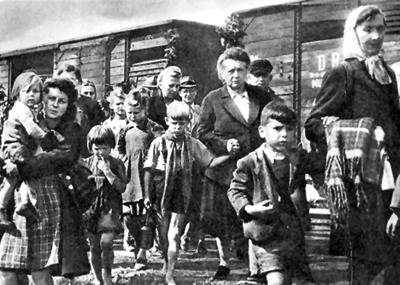
Sudeten Germans are deported from Czechoslovakia after the war.

Although postwar Czechoslovak law deemed all Aryanization transactions invalid, Jewish survivors faced difficulties in regaining their property. The Communist Party of Czechoslovakia opposed restitution, preferring instead to nationalize businesses. Those who had declared German nationality on the 1930 census were stripped of their citizenship and had to reapply for it; in the meantime, they were completely ineligible for restitution or any social benefits, leaving many mired in poverty.

About ninety percent of the three million Germans from the Czech lands were deported during the expulsion of Germans from Czechoslovakia. Jews who had lost their citizenship were also to be expelled as Germans. Due to both official and unofficial discrimination, thousands of Jews applied to leave the country voluntarily. The deportation of Jews was abruptly halted in September 1946 due to unfavorable media coverage and objections from the military governor of the American occupation zone of Germany.

Even though [German-speaking Jews] were harshly persecuted under the Hitler regime ... they—with few exceptions—are now suffering again because they are largely considered "Germans" and treated as such. Nobody acknowledges that nearly all of these Jews were in concentration camps or labor camps and that all those families lost most of their relatives in the gas chambers.

— April 1946 memorandum from the Jewish communities of Komotau and Saaz (Žatec)

Jewish communities in the former Sudetenland were repopulated by some of the 8,000 Jews from Carpathian Ruthenia part of Czechoslovakia before 1939; it was annexed to Soviet Ukraine in 1945. The Carpathian Jews, who represented 40% of the postwar Jewish population in Bohemia, were numerically dominant in the former Sudetenland. Religiously, they tended to be Orthodox Jews in contrast with the German Jews who favored Reform Judaism, and tended to hold separate services.
