= Litoměřice =

- Town
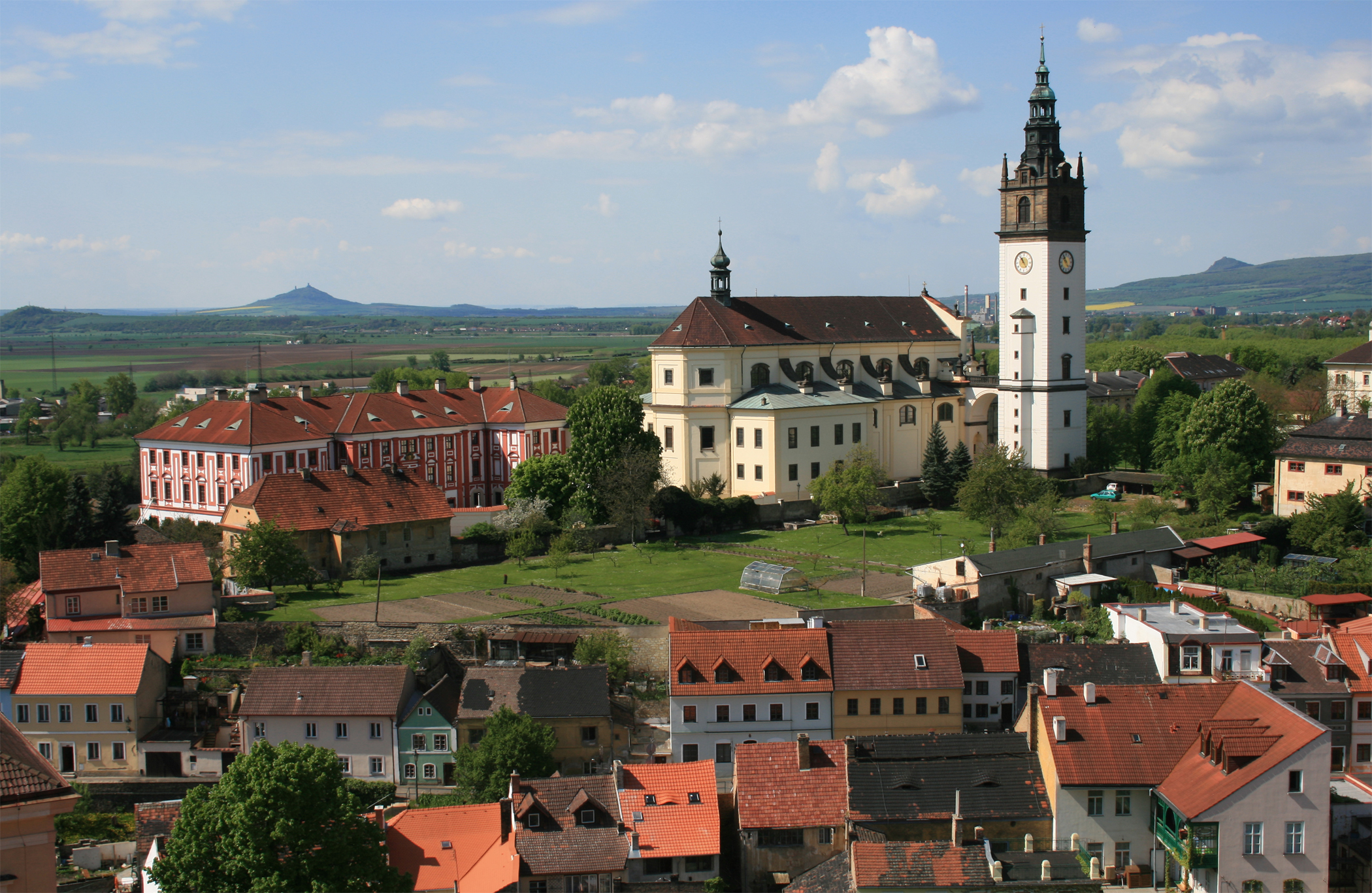
- Cathedral of St. Stephen with belfry

- Flag Coat of arms

- Location in the Czech Republic
- Coordinates: 50°32′3″N 14°7′58″E
- Country: Czech Republic
- Region: Ústí nad Labem
- District: Litoměřice
- First mentioned: 1057

Government
  - Mayor: Filip Hrbek (ODS)

Area
  - Total: 17.99 km^{2} (6.95 sq mi)
- Elevation: 168 m (551 ft)

Population (2026-01-01)
  - Total: 22,627
  - Density: 1,258/km^{2} (3,258/sq mi)
- Time zone: UTC+1 (CET)
  - Summer (DST): UTC+2 (CEST)
- Postal code: 412 01
- Website: www.litomerice.cz

Litoměřice (Czech pronunciation: [ˈlɪtomɲɛr̝ɪtsɛ]; German: Leitmeritz) is a town in the Ústí nad Labem Region of the Czech Republic. It has about 23,000 inhabitants. The town is located at the confluence of the Elbe and Ohře rivers.

Litoměřice is among the oldest settlements in the country. In the Middle Ages, it was a royal town of great political, cultural and economic importance. The historic town centre is well preserved and is protected as an urban monument reservation. The town is the seat of the Diocese of Litoměřice.

== Administrative division ==
Litoměřice consists of four municipal parts (in brackets population according to the 2021 census):

- Litoměřice-Město (1,503)
- Pokratice (4,436)
- Předměstí (17,483)
- Za nemocnicí (10)

== Etymology ==
The initial name of the settlement was Ľutoměrice. The name was derived from the personal name Ľutomír. The permanent change from 'u' to 'i' occurred at the turn of the 14th and 15th centuries.

== Geography ==
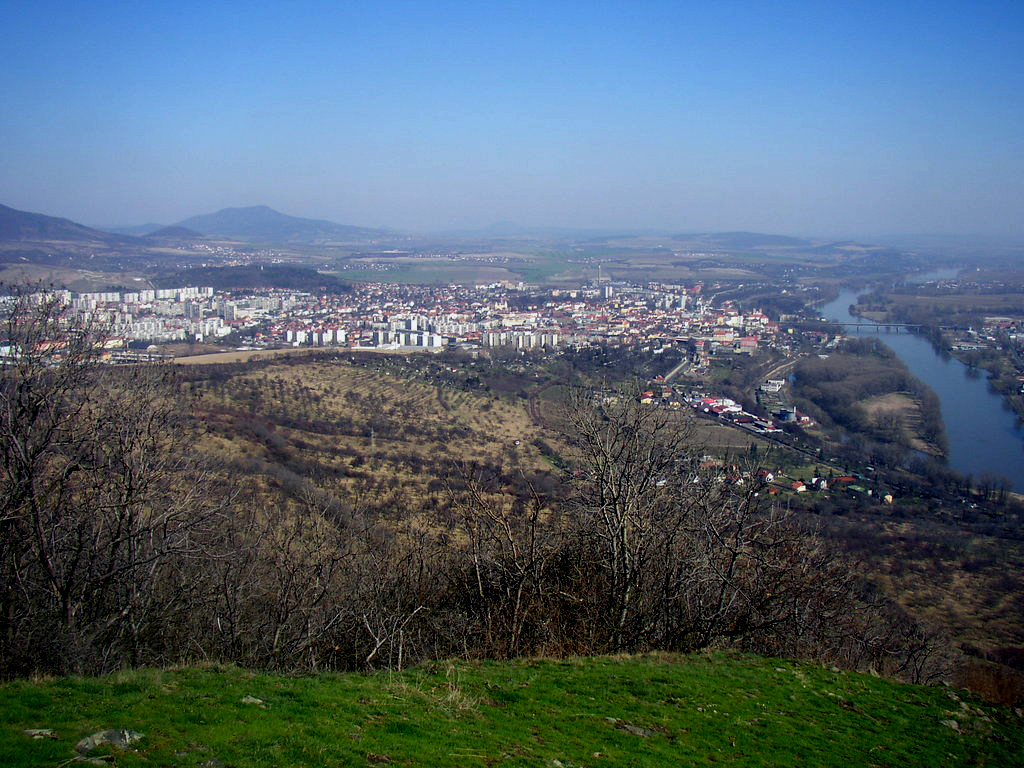
Litoměřice as seen from the hill Radobýl

Litoměřice is located about 15 kilometres (9 mi) south of Ústí nad Labem and 51 km (32 mi) northwest of Prague. The northwestern half of the municipal territory lies in the Central Bohemian Uplands, the southeastern half lies in the Lower Ohře Table, on the edge of the Polabí lowlands. The highest point, located in the northern tip of the territory, is at 480 m (1,575 ft) above sea level. The town is situated on the right (northern) bank of the Elbe River, at its confluence with the Ohře, which flows from the south.

== History ==
=== Early history ===
The settlement of Litoměřice has a deep history of Paleolithic cultures as well as large Celtic settlements of the La Tène culture, which did not survive the incoming Germanic attacks. The area was later settled by Germanic tribes, when Litoměřice first appeared on Ptolemy's world map in the 2nd century under the name of Nomisterium. The Germanic tribes later migrated west and those remaining mingled with the incoming Slavs. The earliest evidence of the Slavic settlement comes from the 8th century.

In the 9th and 10th century, Litoměřice fell under the control of the Přemyslid dynasty. Přemyslids built here an early medieval fortress, one of the most important Přemyslid centres in Czech lands. The area was settled by the Czech tribe of Litoměřici, after which the town was named. In 1057, the Litomeřice Chapter was founded by Duke Spytihněv II, and it is the oldest written evidence of the existence of the town.

A royal-town status was granted in 1219 by King Ottokar I. At the beginning of the 13th century, Litoměřice was an important political, cultural and economic centre. It reached the height of its prosperity under Emperor Charles IV, who bestowed large tracts of productive land on it.

=== 15th–19th centuries ===
The population suffered during the 15th century Hussite Wars. Later it suffered again while taking part in the 1547 revolt against Emperor Ferdinand I. After the Protestant tensions with the Catholics that triggered the Thirty Years' War and the Protestants' defeat in the Battle of White Mountain, the surviving population of the town was forced to accept Catholicism or face property confiscation and the obligation to leave the kingdom. In this way, the town became a Catholic bishop's residency in 1655. As a result, the Czech Protestant population shrank and the town became largely Germanised.

In the 18th century, many Baroque building, which are today cultural monuments, were built. However the prosperity of the town suffered from the War of the Austrian Succession and the Seven Years' War.

=== 20th century ===
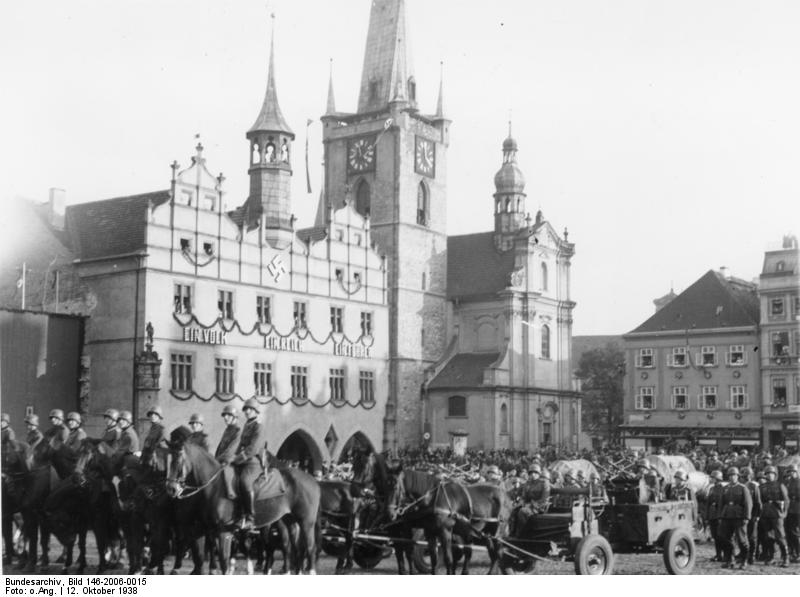
Occupation in 1938

In 1918, Bohemia, Moravia and Czech Silesia became constituent parts of the newly created Czechoslovakia, along with a large border area inhabited predominantly by Sudeten Germans. Local Germans tried to join German Austria (which in turn aimed to join post-war Weimar Republic), but Czechoslovak troops prevented this. Known under the informal name of the Sudetenland, the region became the subject of political controversy in the following years. Czechs settled there again, but remained a minority. In 1938, after the Munich Agreement, German troops occupied the Sudetenland (and all the rest of Czech lands a few months later). The Czech population, which had grown to about 5,000 people, had to leave again.

Jews from Litoměřice were forced to flee to the Protectorate or were deported during the Holocaust in the Sudetenland. From March 1944 to May 1945, Leitmeritz concentration camp was located west of the town. 18,000 prisoners passed through the camp and were forced to work mostly on excavating underground factories (Richard I and Richard II) under Radobýl. 4,500 died.

In the final stages of World War II, German troops retreated to escape the advancing Red Army. The Czech resistance took control of the castle on 27 April 1945, and after a few days they started negotiations with the German commander about the terms of his surrender. The Wehrmacht capitulated in the night after 8 May, but German troops fled on 9 May, just before Soviet troops entered the town on 10 May 1945. Most of the German-speaking population was expelled by the Beneš decrees in August 1945.

== Demographics ==
Historical population

Year	Pop.	±%
1869	10,811	—
1880	11,728	+8.5%
1890	12,203	+4.1%
1900	14,063	+15.2%
1910	16,595	+18.0%

Year	Pop.	±%
1921	18,135	+9.3%
1930	19,718	+8.7%
1950	15,126	−23.3%
1961	16,830	+11.3%
1970	19,595	+16.4%

Year	Pop.	±%
1980	22,869	+16.7%
1991	25,719	+12.5%
2001	24,879	−3.3%
2011	24,098	−3.1%
2021	23,432	−2.8%

Source: Censuses

== Economy ==
There are no large industrial enterprises located in Litoměřice. The largest employer is the hospital.

Litoměřice is known for viticulture and wine-making. It is the centre of the Litoměřická wine subregion. The existence of vineyards is already documented in the first written mention of Litoměřice from 1057.

== Transport ==
The I/15 road from Most to Česká Lípa runs through the town.

Litoměřice is served by three train stations. The station Litoměřice město is located on the Ústí nad Labem–Kolín line. The stations Litoměřice horní nádraží and Litoměřice Cihelna are located on the lines Most–Litoměřice and Česká Lípa–Postoloprty.

== Religion ==
The town is the seat of the Diocese of Litoměřice (part of Archdiocese of Prague), the fourth oldest (and third still existing) Catholic diocese on present Czech territory.

== Culture ==
Litoměřice is known for the annual event Zahrada Čech ('garden of Bohemia'). It is an extensive horticultural trade fair, attended by tens of thousands of people.

North Bohemian Gallery of Fine Arts is based close the main square. Extensive collection spans from 13th century to contemporary art with numerous other exhibitions during the year. On the square Mírové náměstí is also the Gallery and Museum of the Diocese of Litoměřice.

== Education ==
Litoměřice is home to eight secondary schools, including two public schools: Josef Jungmann Gymnasium and Secondary School of Pedagogy, Hotel Management and Services. There are nine primary schools.

== Sights ==
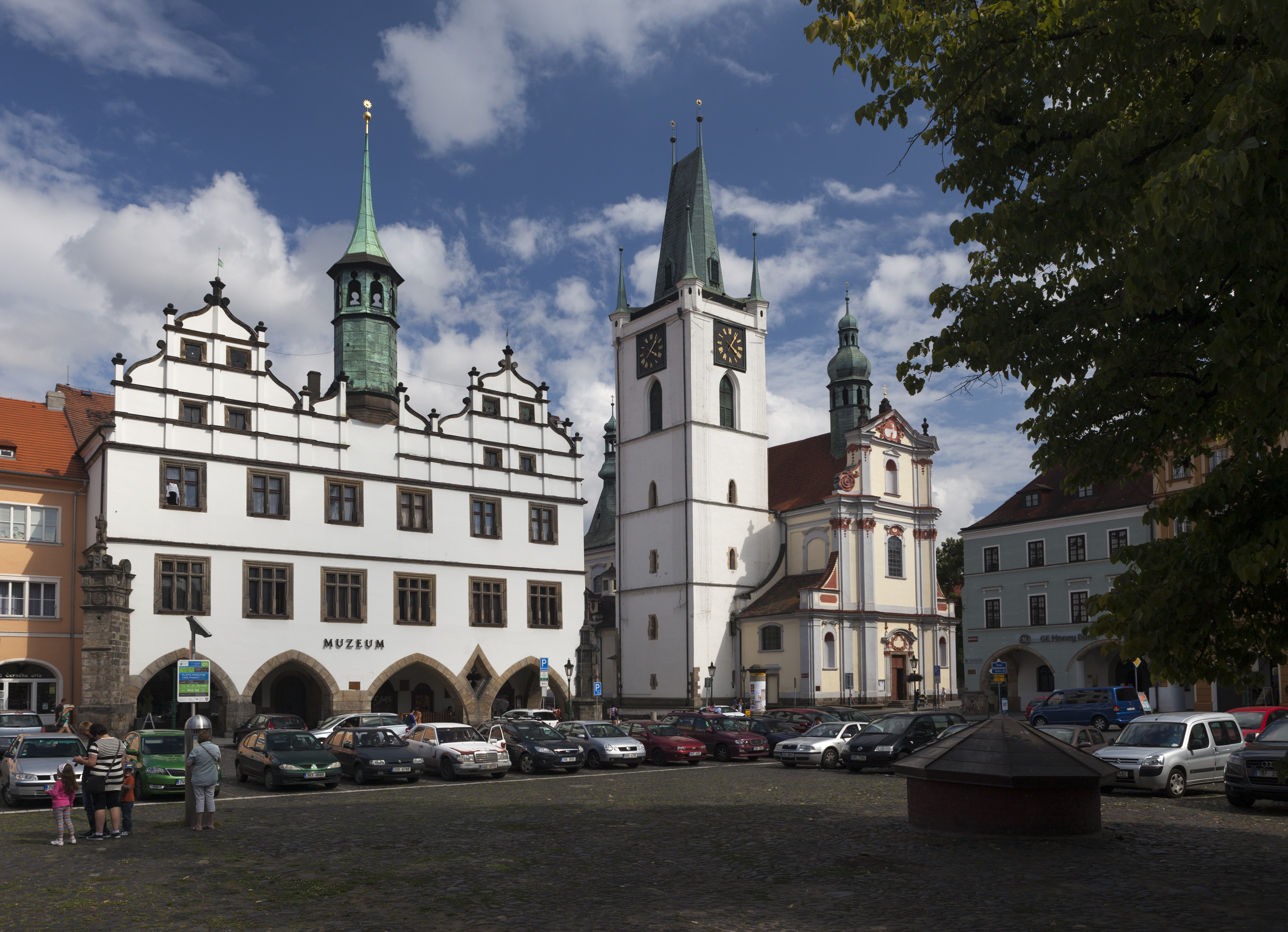
Old Town Hall and the Church of All Saints

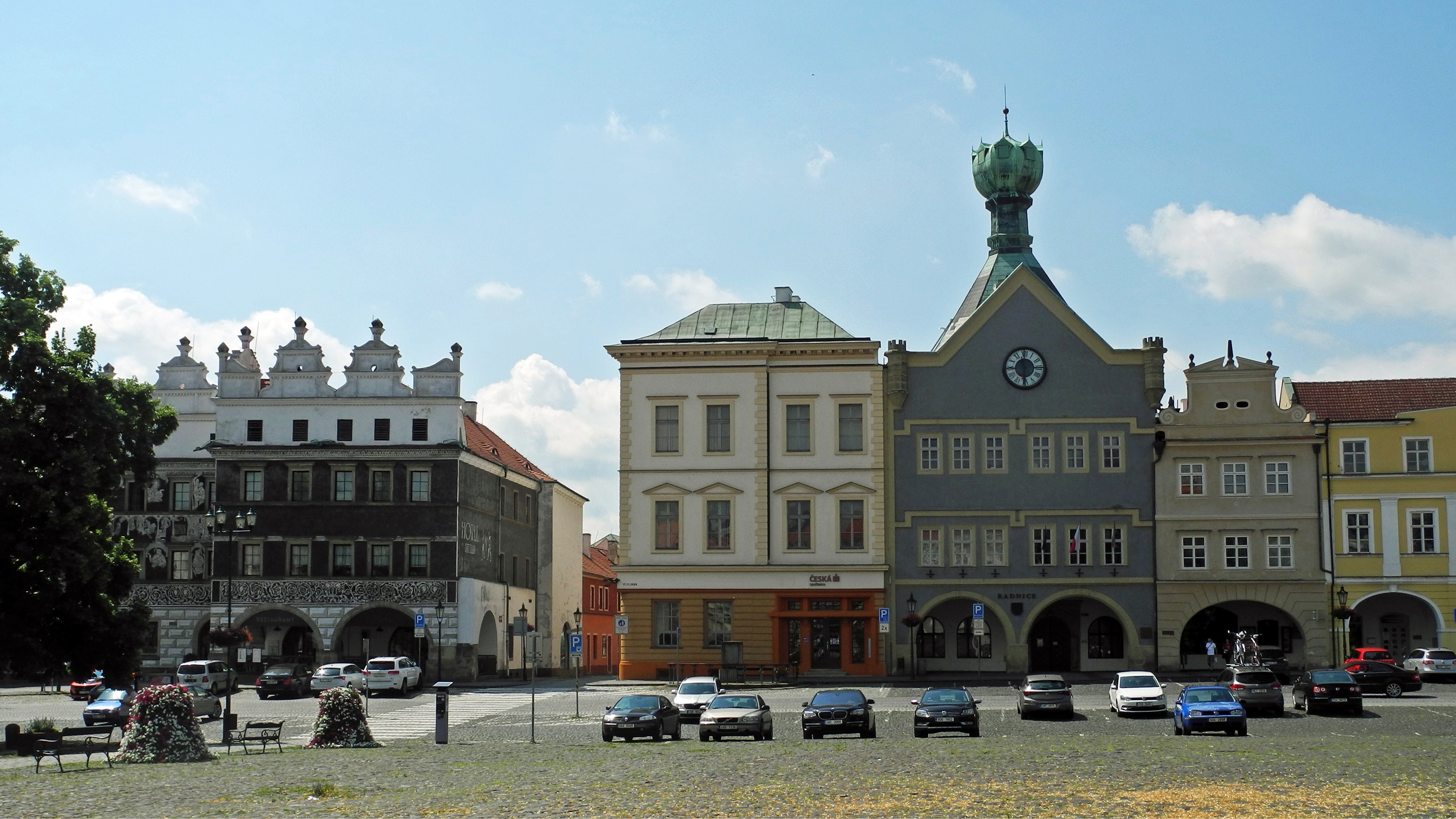
Mírové náměstí with the town hall

Since 1978, the historic centre of Litoměřice has been an urban monument reservation. The protected territory is delimited by remains of town walls. About 1,800 metres (5,900 ft) of town walls is preserved to this day. Originally they had four town gates, none of them is preserved. Part of the town fortifications was Litoměřice Castle. Today it contains an exposition of Czech viticulture.

Its core forms Mírové námšstí, a large square with an area of about 2 hectares. Most of the houses on the square are in the Gothic style. The Old Town Hall building on the square is the oldest Renaissance building in the town. Originally built in the late Gothic style at the end of the 14th century, it was completely rebuilt in the Renaissance style in 1537–1541. In the 19th century, the town hall was moved from the building, and the Old Town Hall was adapted into the regional court. From 1927, the building houses the regional museum. It is among the most valuable town hall buildings in the Czech Republic and from 2024, it has been protected as a national cultural monument.

Other sights on the square include the "Chalice house" (new town hall with a lookout tower in the shape of chalice), Dům u černého orla ("Black Eagle House"; one of the most significant Renaissance houses), and Museum of Crystal Touch.

There are numerous cellars connected by an extensive web of underground ways under the town. In some places, the cellars were built in three floors. The ways are about 3 kilometres (1.9 mi) long and they belong to the longest of their kind in the county. Only 336 metres (1,102 feet) of these underground ways are open to the public.

=== Sacral monuments ===
There are several valuable sacral buildings in Litoměřice. On the main square, there is the Church of All Saints. Its existence was firstly mentioned in 1235. Originally it belonged to the town fortification. It has a 54 metres (177 ft) high bell tower. The Cathedral of Saint Stephen at the Dómské náměstí was built in the Baroque style in place of an older Romanesque basilica in the years 1664–1668. It has a 50 metres (160 ft) high tower open to the public. The interior is almost completely authentic with main and six side altars and a lot of original paintings. Right next to the dome is a bishop's residence built in 1683–1701 by Giulio Broggio.

There is also the Jesuit Church of the Annunciation. It is a massive Baroque church built by Giulio and Octavio Broggio in 1701–1731.

== Notable people ==
- Master of the Litoměřice Altarpiece (c. 1470–?), painter
- Antonio Rosetti (c. 1750–1792), composer and double bass player
- Josef Jungmann (1773–1847), poet and linguist, lived and taught here
- Vincent Bochdalek (1801–1883), anatomist and pathologist
- Josef Emanuel Hilscher (1806–1837), Austrian soldier, poet and translator
- Karel Hynek Mácha (1810–1836), poet, originally buried here
- Bedřich Wachsmann (1820–1897), painter and architect
- Ferdinand Blumentritt (1853–1913), Austrian teacher and ethnographer
- Alfred Kubin (1877–1959), Austrian printmaker and illustrator
- Štěpán Trochta (1905–1974), cardinal
- Kurt Honolka (1913–1988), German musicologist and music critic
- Peter Lerche (1928–2016), German jurist
- Johann Georg Reißmüller (1932–2018), German journalist
- Dietrich Mattausch (born 1940), German actor
- Rudolf Buchbinder (born 1946), Austrian classical pianist
- Zdeněk Pecka (1954–2024), rower, Olympic medalist
- Jiří Macháček (born 1966), singer and actor
- Milan Hnilička (born 1973), ice hockey player and politician
- Martin Škoula (born 1979), ice hockey player
- Oldřiška Marešová (born 1986), high jumper

== Twin towns – sister cities ==
Litoměřice is twinned with:

- Armentières, France
- Calamba, Philippines
- Dapitan, Philippines
- Fulda, Germany
- Meissen, Germany
