= Academic legion =

Academic legion may refer to:

- 36th Infantry Regiment (Poland), a Polish regiment formed in the early 20th century
- Academic Legion (Vienna), a revolutionary students' group in Vienna in 1848
