= Adolf Fischhof =

Hungarian-Austrian writer and politician (1816–1893)

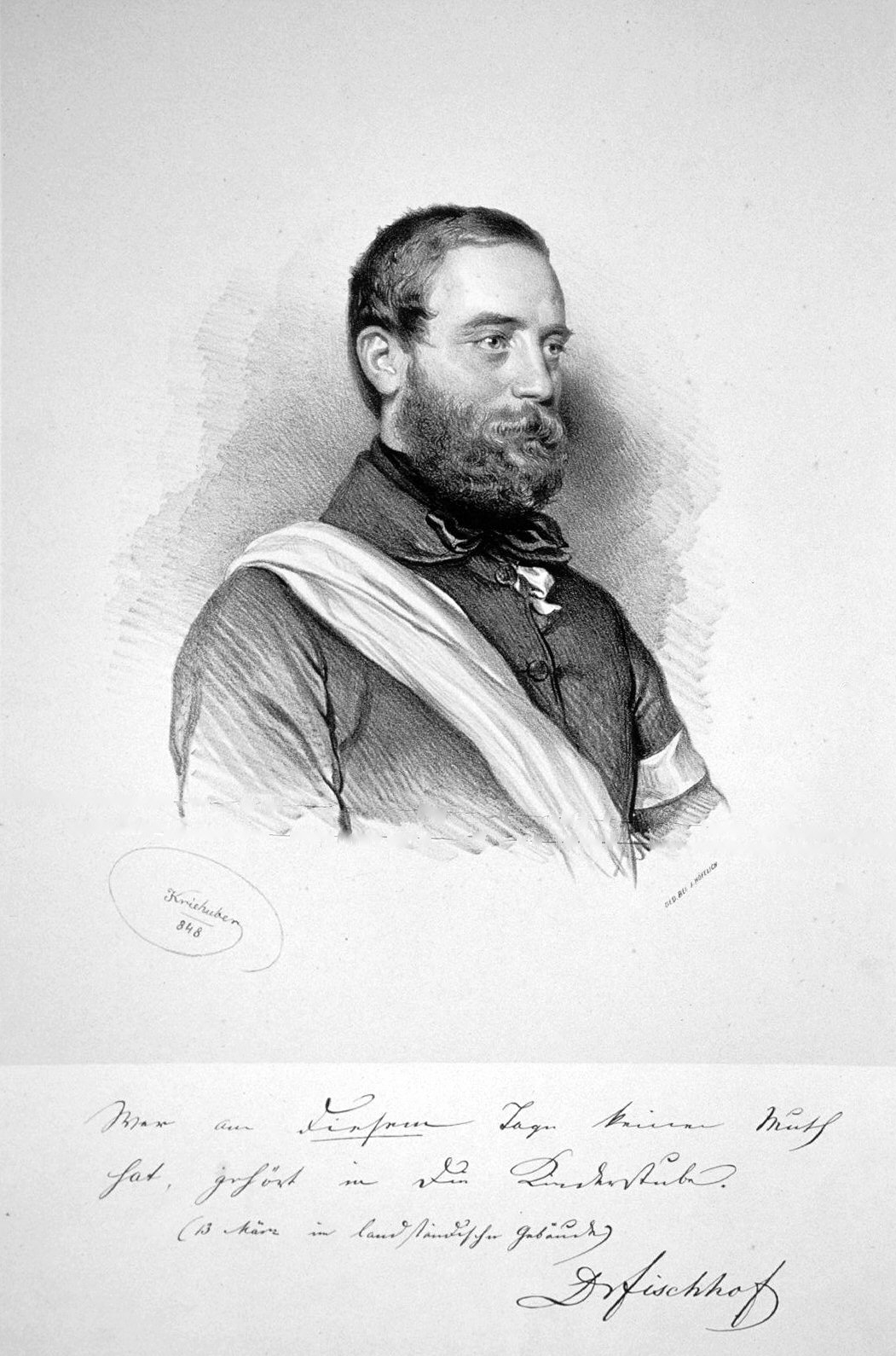
- Adolf Fischhof, 1848
- Born: 8 December 1816; Alt-Ofen/Óbuda, Hungary
- Died: 23 March 1893 (aged 76); Emmersdorf, today a part of Klagenfurt, Carinthia
- Occupations: Politician, later political theorist

Adolf Fischhof (Hungarian: Fischhof Adolf; 8 December 1816 – 23 March 1893) was a Hungarian-Austrian writer and politician of Jewish descent.

After studying medicine (1836–1844) he was appointed physician at the Vienna hospital. Fischhof was one of the leaders in the revolutionary movement of 1848, commanding the students' legion of Vienna and presiding over the Committee of Public Security. He was especially prominent in the Constitutional Assembly (Reichstag), in which he represented one of the Vienna districts. In the Liberal cabinet of Doblhoff he was attached as counselor to the Ministry of the Interior. After the dissolution of the Kremsier Parliament on 7 March 1849, Fischhof was arrested, accused of rebellion and high treason, but was acquitted after an imprisonment of 9 months. He devoted himself to the practise of medicine until about 1875, when failing health compelled him to retire.

With Joseph Unger, later a member of the Austrian cabinet, he published in 1861 a pamphlet entitled "Lösung der Ungarischen Frage", in which he called for the division of the empire into Austria and Hungary. After the Austro-Prussian War of 1866 Fischhof wrote "Ein Blick auf Oesterreich's Lage", and strongly advised an alliance with Germany. In his "Oesterreich und die Bürgschaften Seines Bestandes", 1869, he recommended an autonomous constitution for Austria.

In his publications Fischhof strongly advocated a federal organization of the Austrian Empire and a high degree of autonomy for national minorities. His views contrasted with the centralistic outlook of the German Liberal cabinet that was appointed by Emperor Francis-Joseph in 1867. The German liberals believed that centralism would guarantee a German majority and safeguard the liberal reforms that were introduced by this cabinet. Fischhof, however, stated that true liberalism would guarantee not just individual liberties for Austrian citizens but also national liberties for Austria's national minorities. He was convinced that only federalism could prevent a break-up of the Habsburg Monarchy along national lines. This, he believed, would ultimately lead to German or Russian domination over the small nationalities in Central Europe and end the relative freedom they enjoyed under Habsburg rule. History was to prove him right.

After the collapse of German Liberalism in 1879 and the coming to power of a clerical-conservative government that could count on Slav support, Fischhof, in the conjunction with Ernst Baron Walterskirchen, planned in 1882 the foundation of a German-Austrian people's party. This party should act as a mediator in the question of nationalities and unite all liberal elements of the empire; but his efforts were frustrated by the resistance of the mainstream German Liberal constitutional party.

The views of Fischhof not only differed from those of the majority of German-Liberals, but also from those of the Jewish bourgeoisie that, just as Fischhof, identified strongly with the principles of liberalism. Unlike Fischhof most middle class Jews supported mainstream German-Liberalism well into the 1880s, when it had long proven to be unable to stop the radicalization of Austrian politics and the growing anti-semitism that was part of this.

== Works ==
- Zur Erweiterung der Munizipalautonomie (1868)
- Zur Reduktion der Kontinentalen Heere (1875)
- Die Sprachenrechte in den Staaten Gemischter Nationalität (1885)
- Der Oesterreichische Sprachenzwist (1888)
