= Postoloprty Castle =

Baroque castle in Postoloprty, Czech Republic

Coordinates: 50.3590775°N 13.7007604°E

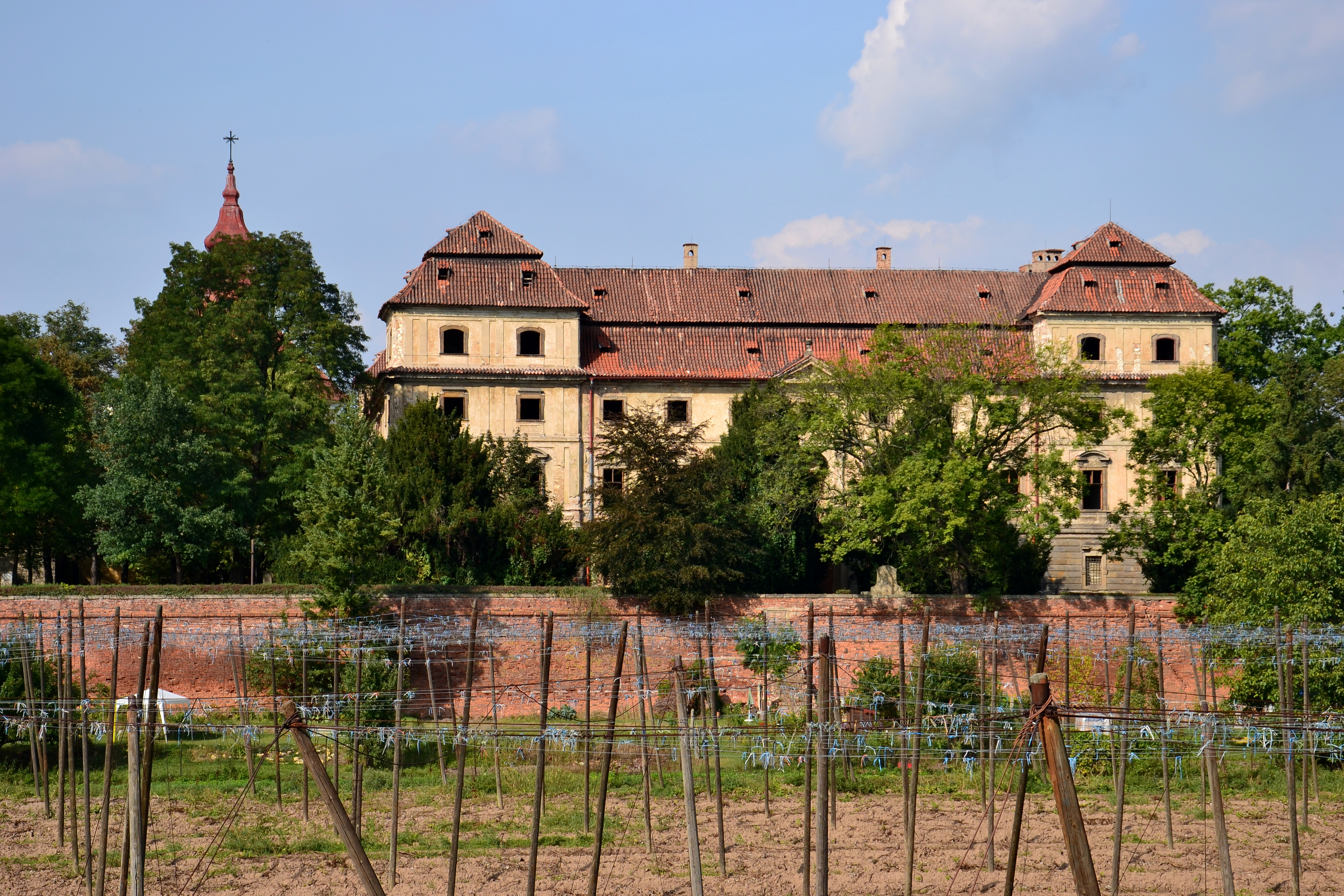
View from the south

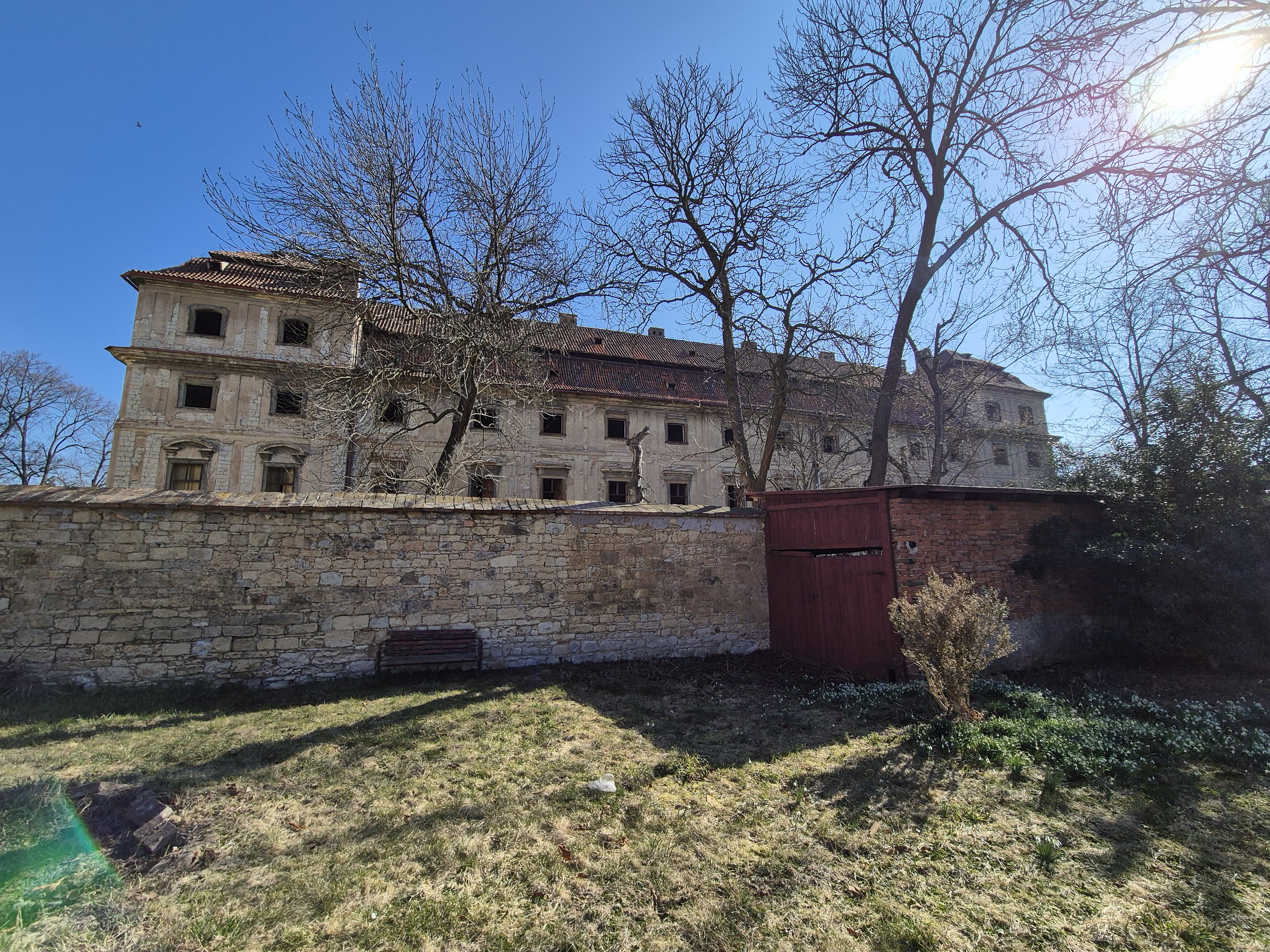
Postoloprty Castle in 2025

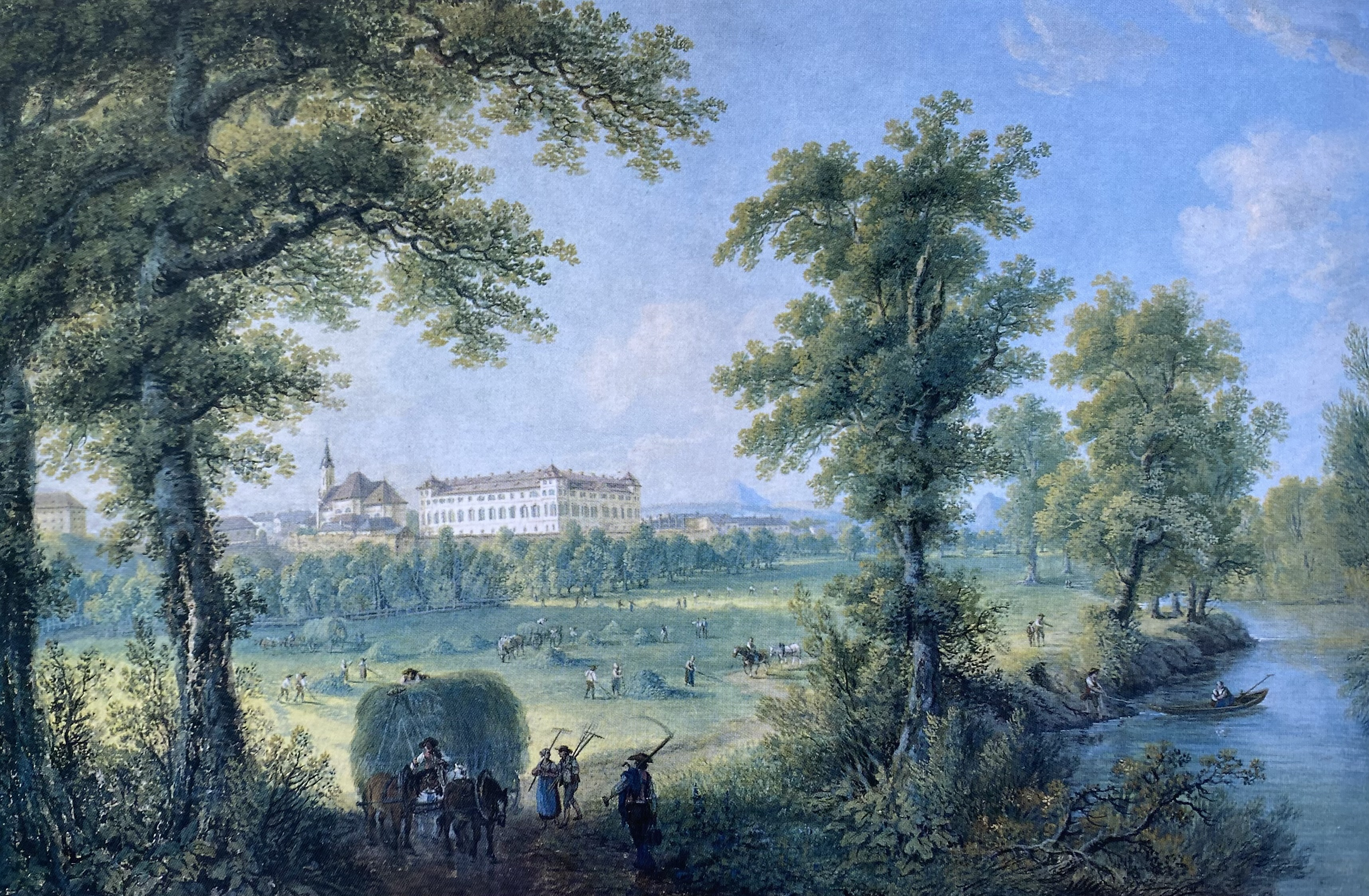
Postoloprty Castle (or Schloss Postelberg) by Ferdinand Runk (1st half 19th century)

Postoloprty Castle (Czech: zámek Postoloprty; German: Schloss Postelberg) is a Baroque palace in Postoloprty in the Czech Republic. The castle was constructed in the 17th century on the location of a former monastery. It was a seat of the princely Schwarzenberg family until the Second World War, when it was confiscated, first by the German Reich and afterwards by the Czechoslovak Government. The Schwarzenberg heirs were not successful in reclaiming ownership, and it was sold to a businessman, who neglected it.

Today, the palace is in poor condition and deteriorating. In 2021, the town of Postoloprty became owner of the castle and aims to restore it.

== History ==
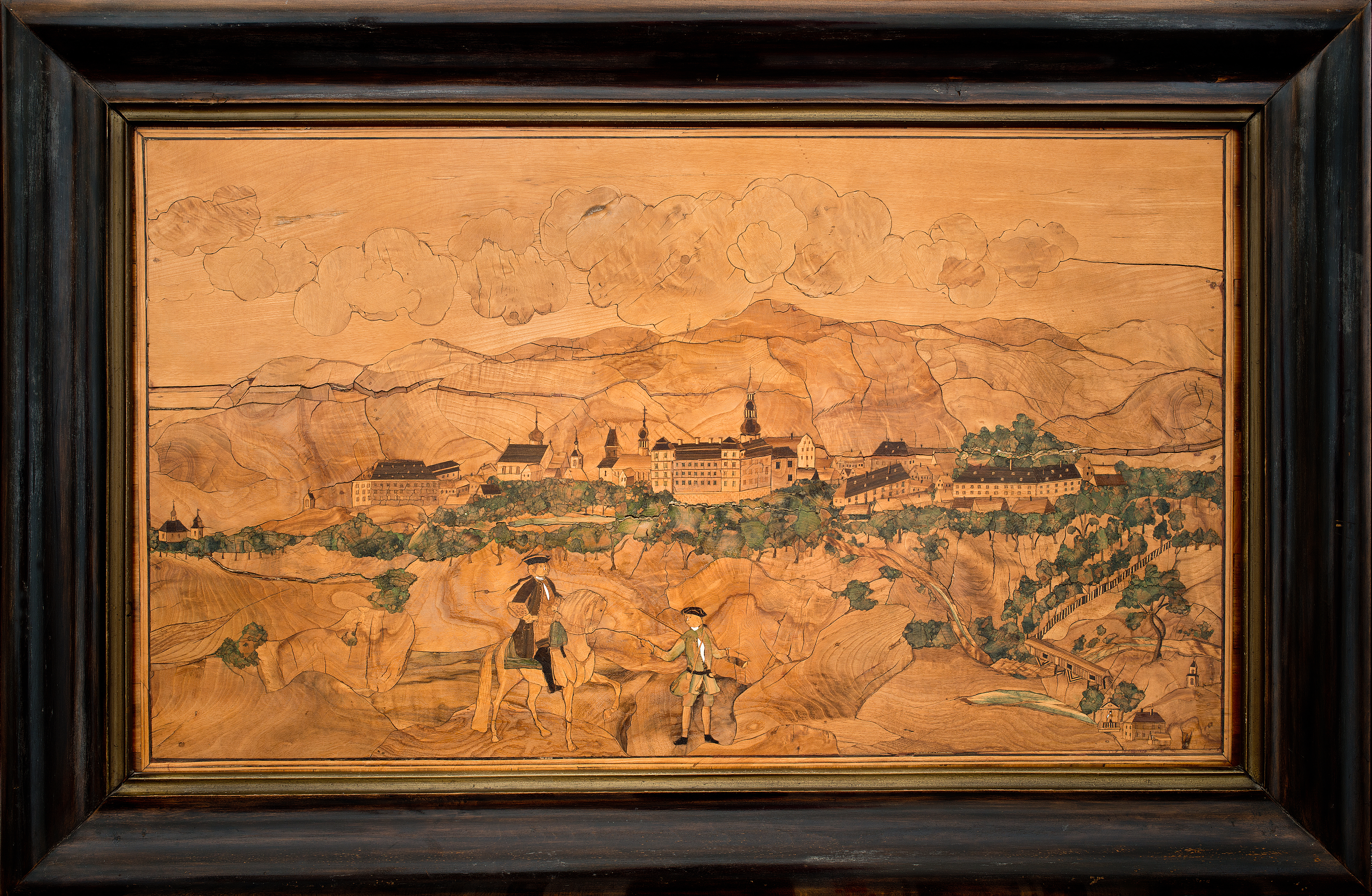
Postoloprty castle and town in 1727

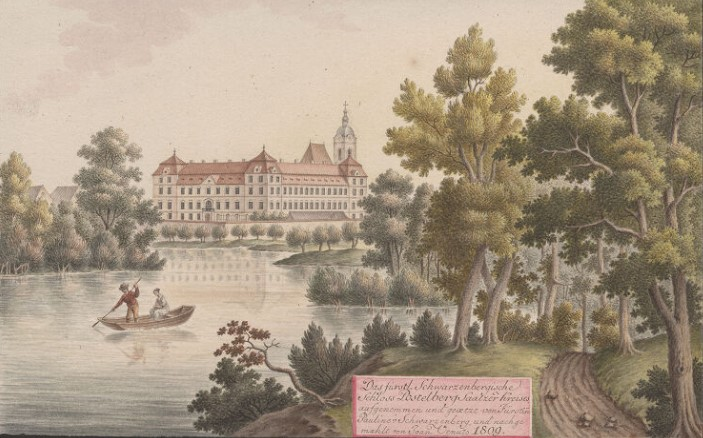
Postoloprty Castle by Pauline of Schwarzenberg (1809)

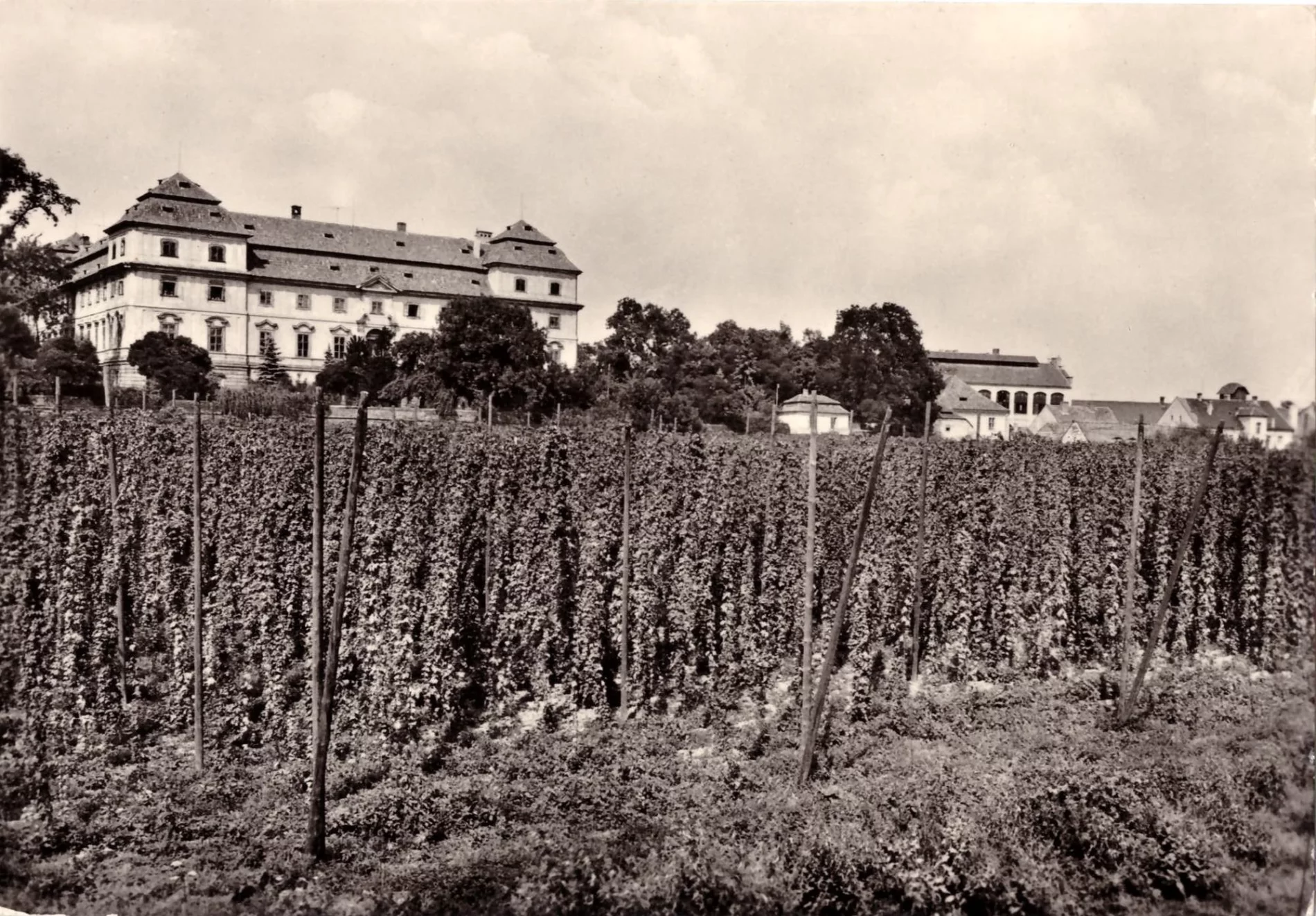
Postoloprty Castle with hop growing in its front (1930s)

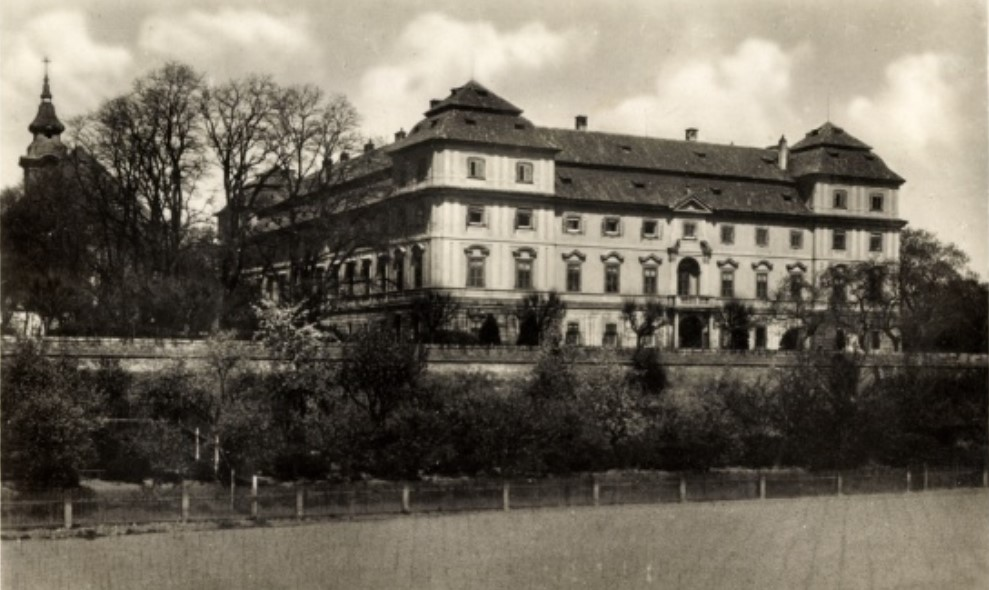
Postoloprty Castle (1930s)

=== Benedictine monastery ===
Postoloprty Castle was built at the location of a former Benedictine men's monastery. The monastery and village were first mentioned in historical documents in 1125.

=== Weitmühl family ===
During the first half of the 16th century, Sebastian von Weitmühl (Czech: Šebestián z Veitmile) (1490–1549) became lord of Postoloprty and built a castle in the village. It first appeared in written sources around 1550, when his estate was divided between his sons. The castle was inherited by his son Christian von Weitmühl, and subsequently his son Jan Beneš von Weitmühl auf Postelberg. After Jan Beneš's death, the entire estate was inherited by the humanist scholar Jan Vavřinec, who established an art collection with a library there. He died in 1584 in Italy, and his wife Eliška of Zierotin took over the estate's administration. The last owner from the Weithmühl family was Eliška's daughter Veronika, who sold Postoloprty in 1600 to her husband Stephan Georg of Sternberg (Czech: Štěpán Jiří ze Šternberka) (1570–1625) for 42,000 Meissen groschen.

=== Sternberg family ===
In 1611, Stephan Georg of Sternberg had a new baroque palace built on the site of the old castle, which was now deemed inadequate. In 1620, the castle was plundered by a peasant army that attacked Ernst von Mansfeld's military camp in Postoloprty. Stephan Georg had already moved to Louny with his servants and valuable property before this attack. The peasants killed about 350 soldiers, wounded Captain Goldstein, and destroyed the library and archive. Georg Stephan died in 1625, and five years later, his sons divided the estate. Both kept half of the castle; Jan Rudolf von Sternberg had the town itself, while Adam Jan inherited the surrounding villages. However, Adam Jan died in 1633, and his share passed to his brother, who sold the entire estate to Václav Michna of Vacínov four years later.

=== Schwarzenberg family ===
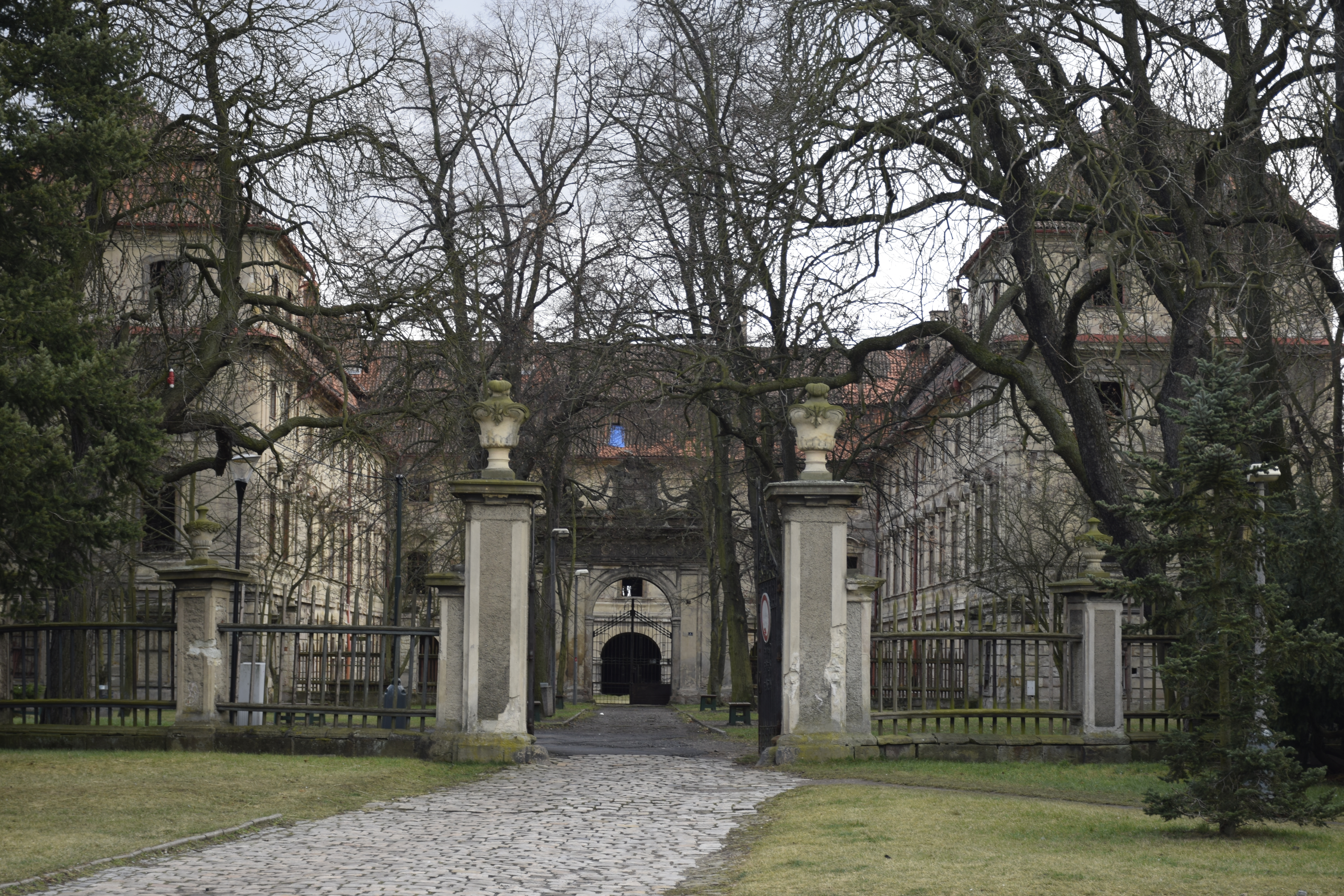
Entrance to the castle

After Václav Michna, the Postoloprty estate was inherited by his nephew Zikmund Norbert in 1667, who died two years later but managed to burden the estate with debt. In the same year, the indebted estate was bought by Georg Ludwig von Sinzendorf (1616–1681) for 240,000 Rhine guilders, and he began to restore the estate. After his death in 1681, the estate was inherited by his firstborn son, Christian Ludwig von Sinzendorf, but he soon fell in battle against the Turks in 1687, and his property passed to his younger brother Philipp von Sinzendorf (1671–1742), who again sold the indebted estate in 1692 for 600,000 Rhine guilders to the prince Ferdinand of Schwarzenberg (1652–1703). The dilapidated castle, equipped only with essential furniture, was used for drying hops at that time.

Prince Ferdinand had the castle remodelled between 1706 and 1718 according to the design of architect Pavel Ignác Bayer (1656–1733). In the 1720s, he also involved the architect Gabriel de Gabrieli (1671-1747) from Vienna in the rebuilding and the design of the garden.

The frequent presence of troops during the Seven Years' War from 1756 to 1763 heavily affected the castle, and it even burned down in 1768, but the then owner, the 5th prince Johann I of Schwarzenberg (1742–1789), had it immediately repaired. However, the reconstruction was not completed until 1790 because Prussian soldiers damaged the unfinished castle during the War of the Bavarian Succession.

Next to their main residences in Český Krumlov and Hluboká, the princes of Schwarzenberg frequently stayed in their Postoloprty Castle.

=== Adolph Schwarzenberg and the Second World War ===
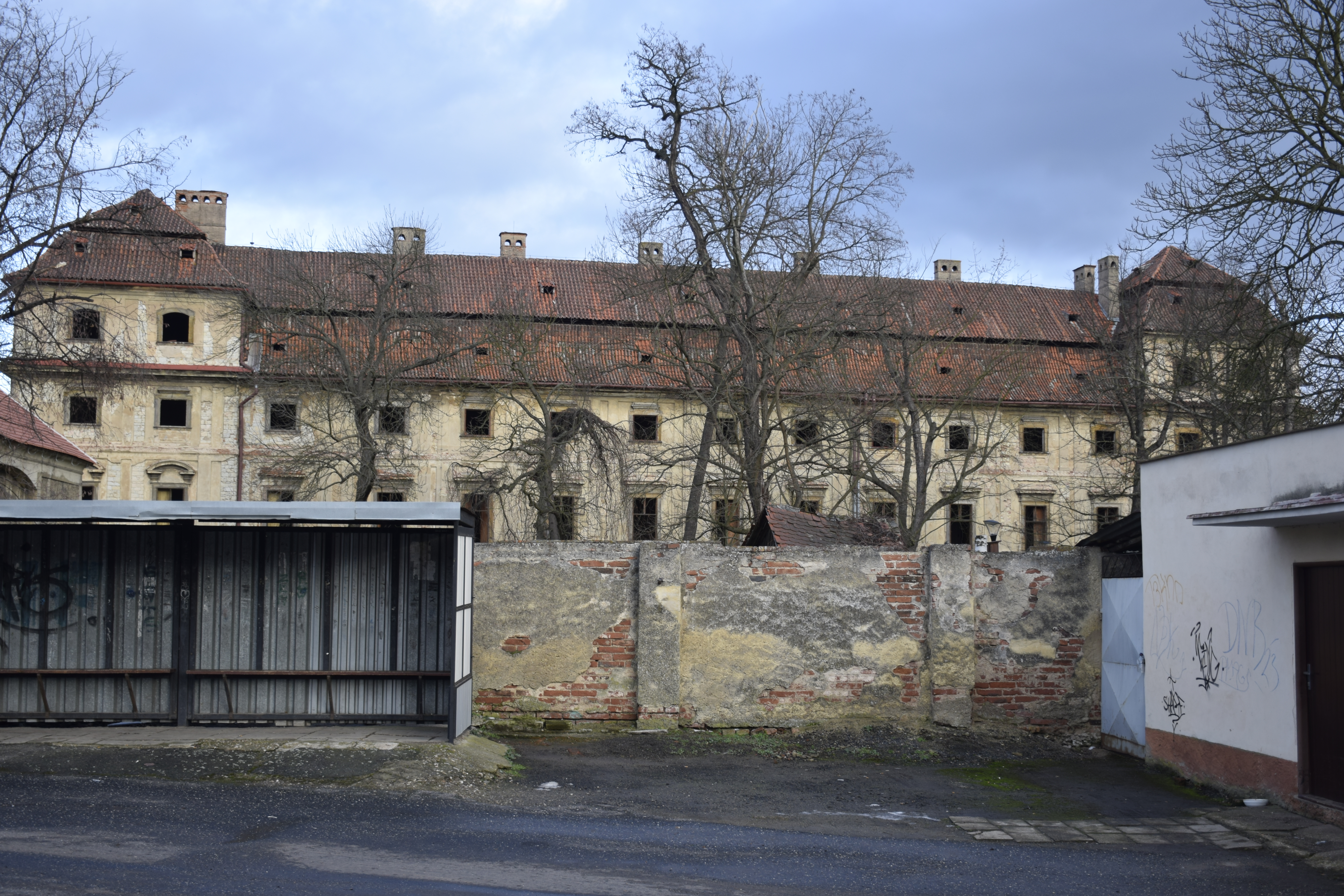
Rear view

Prince Adolph Schwarzenberg (1890–1950) was an outspoken opponent of the Nazi regime, even before the invasion of Czechoslovakia. During the Second World War, he had to flee to the United States of America. The German Reich confiscated all his properties within their reach. His adoptive son (and nephew), prince Henry of Schwarzenberg was taken to various police prisons before being incarcerated in the Buchenwald concentration camp. Prince Henry was released in 1944 and served the remainder of the war as a forced labourer.

After the end of the Second World War, prince Adolph prepared to return to Czechoslovakia. However, the Czechoslovak government prevented this. Also, they tried to confiscate his properties in 1945 through the so-called Beneš decrees. This did not seem to work out as planned as it was difficult to portray the prince as a traitor to Czechoslovakia. The government, increasingly under communist influence, still wanted to have the assets of the prince without giving a reason or offering compensation. Therefore they drafted a special law in 1947, later known as Lex Schwarzenberg to confiscate all his estates, including Postoloprty Castle. This law has proved to be highly controversial as it is a piece of arbitrary ad hominem legislation, but Czechoslovakia became communist and the law came into effect.

=== Post Second World War into the 21st century ===
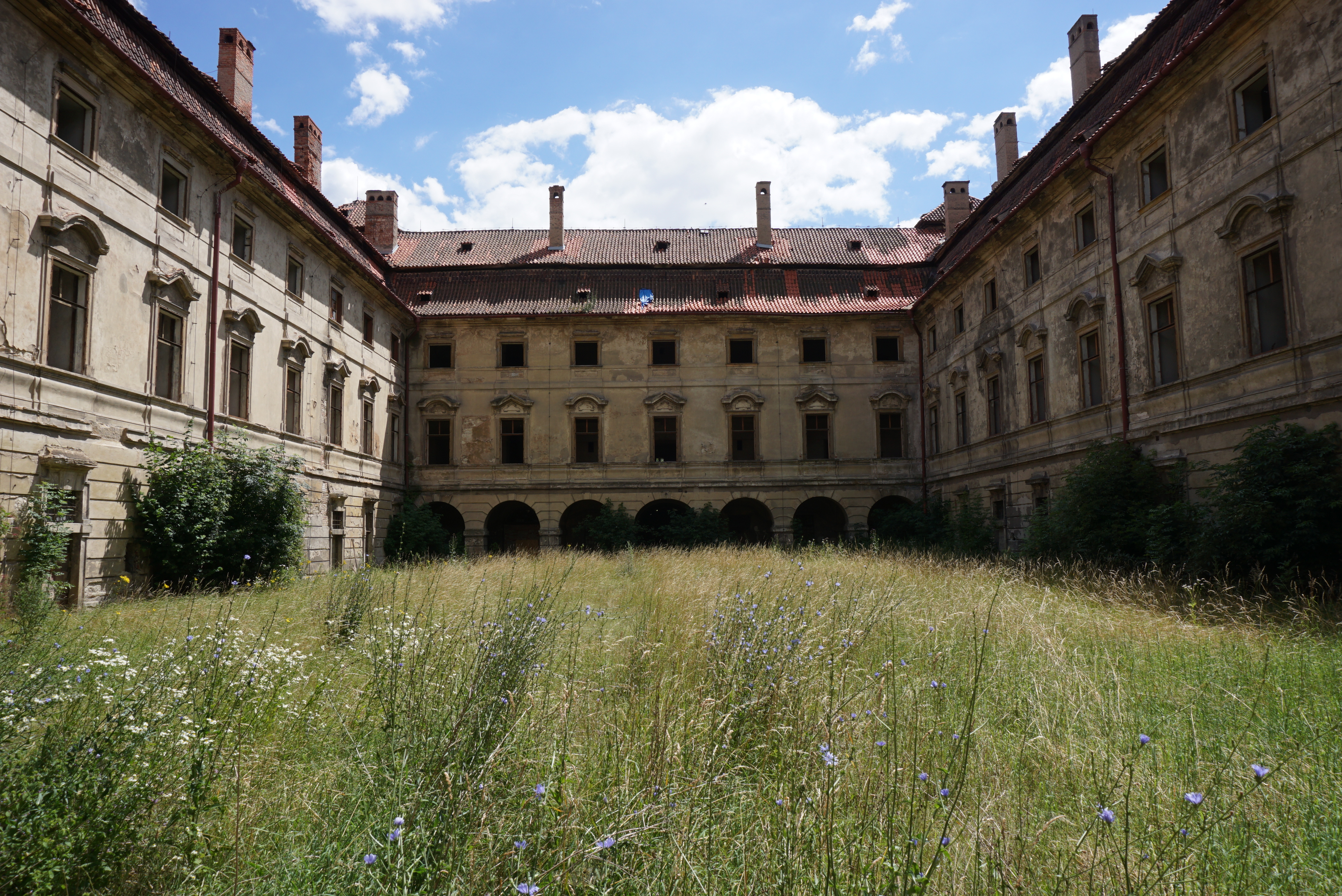
Courtyard of the castle

In the second half of the 20th century, the castle housed a depository of the State Library of the Czechoslovak Republic in Prague.

After the fall of the communism, the daughter of prince Henry, Elisabeth von Pezold, tried to regain the ownership of Postoloprty Castle. But the Czech courts rejected her claims in January 2015. In the meantime, the Czech government had sold the castle in 2004 to an Italian businessman, Mauro Piccinini. Initially, he did not invest in the castle due to the legal disputes. And afterwards, he tried to sell the castle as soon as possible, which did not work out. During his ownership, the condition of Postoloprty Castle deteriorated significantly into an alarming state. Due to this and the dilapidation of two other properties owned by Piccinini (the castle of Cítoliby and, until 2013, the baroque farmstead in Kystra), legal proceedings started in 2018. In the end, Piccinini was sentenced to a suspended prison term.

In October 2021, the town of Postoloprty bought the castle for 13.2 million CZK with the aim of repairing it for cultural events, apartments for the elderly and clerks' offices.

== Architecture ==
The original castle, built at the beginning of the seventeenth century, had four wings covered by a tile roof. In 1680, during the renovations by Georg Ludwig von Sinzendorf, a square tower designed by Jiří Pach of Wiesenthal was added. According to a description from 1739, when a storm tore off its roof, the tower had three floors, a clock with dials on all four sides, and a gateway at the ground level that led into the courtyard.

During the reconstruction in the second half of the eighteenth century, the northern castle wing facing the square and the tower were demolished. It was the intention that it would be reconstructed basis a design proposed by Johan Schmidt. However, in the end this did not happen. A more economical design by Andreas Zach was executed and this is what we see to day: a pavilion at the end of the wing and in the middle a neoclassical gate. The remaining three two-story castle wings surround a courtyard separated from the town by a wrought-iron fence. On the courtyard side of the central wing, there are pillar arcades on the ground floor, and pavilion extensions emphasize the corners.

== Gallery ==
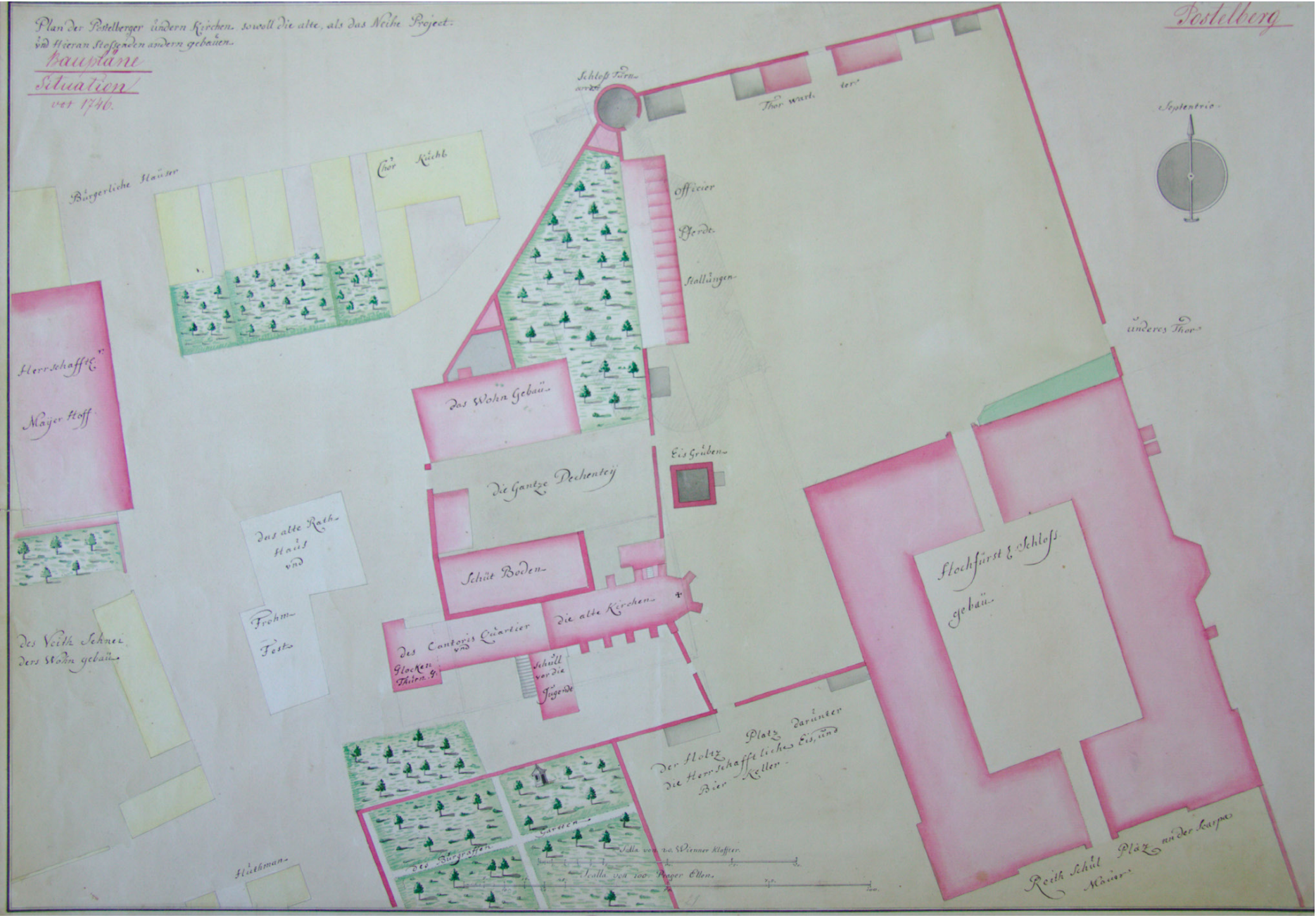
Map of the castle and its direct surroundings before 1746

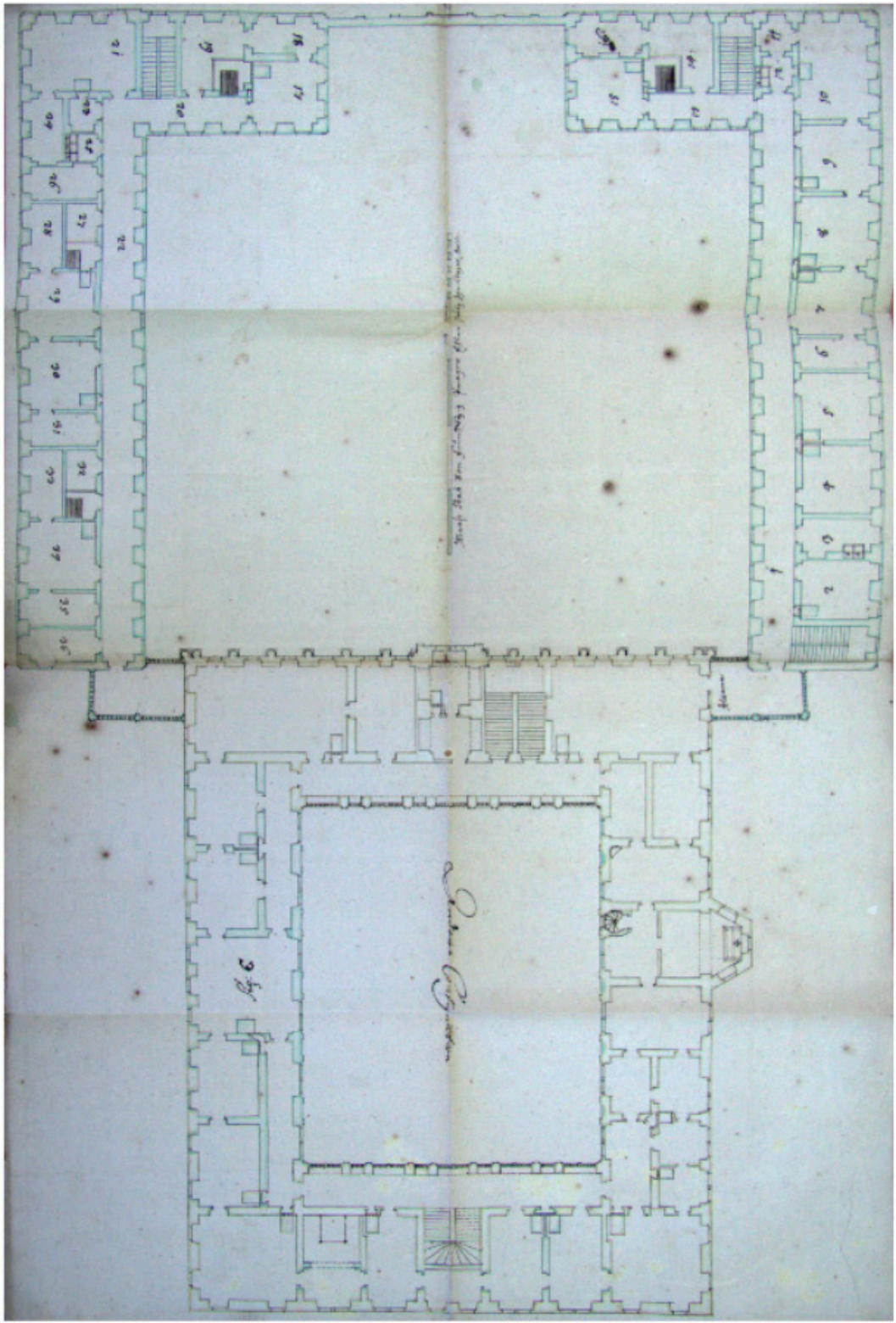
Floor plan by Pavel Ignac Bayer (1710s)

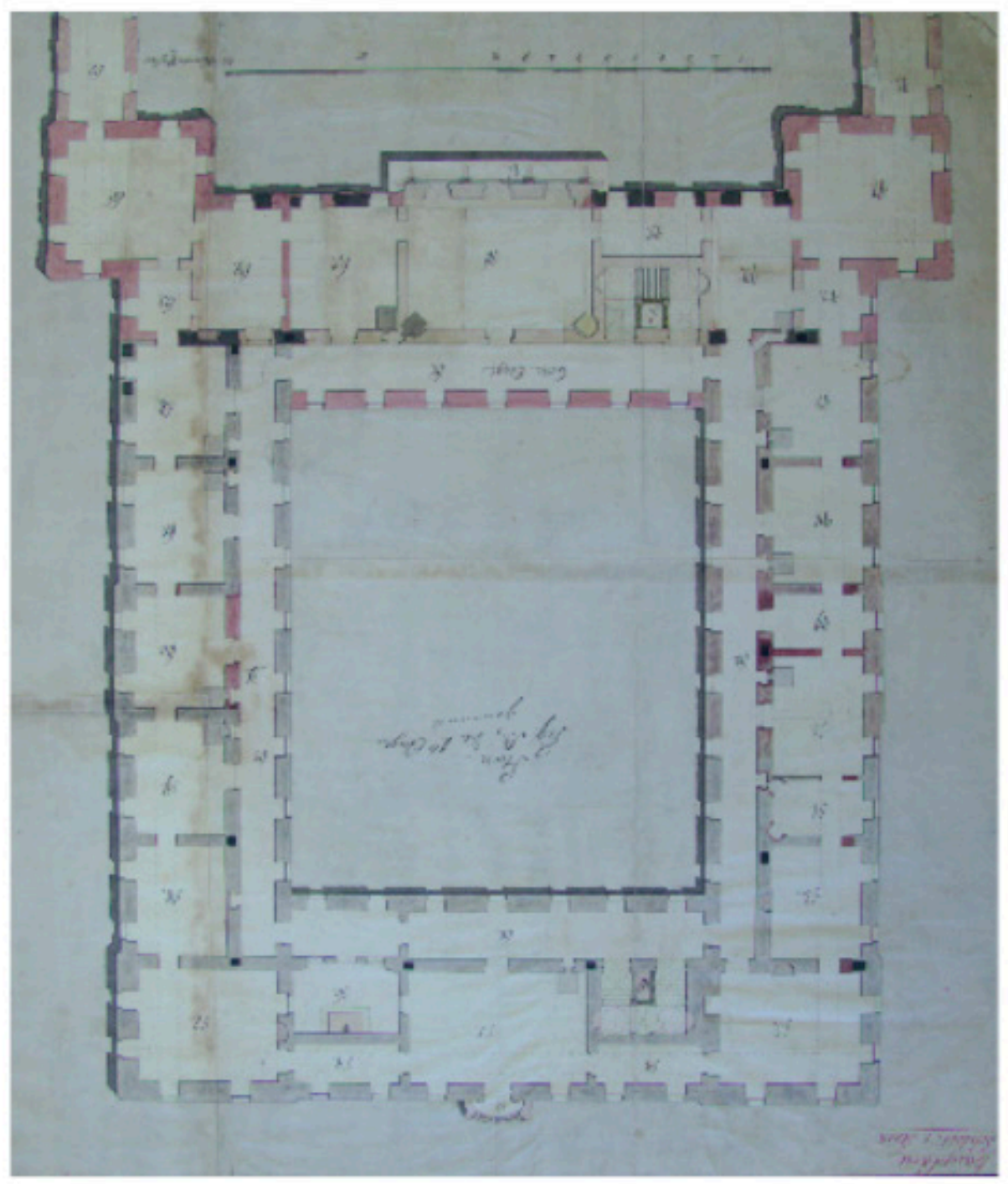
Floor plan reconstruction proposal Johannes Schmidt (1769)

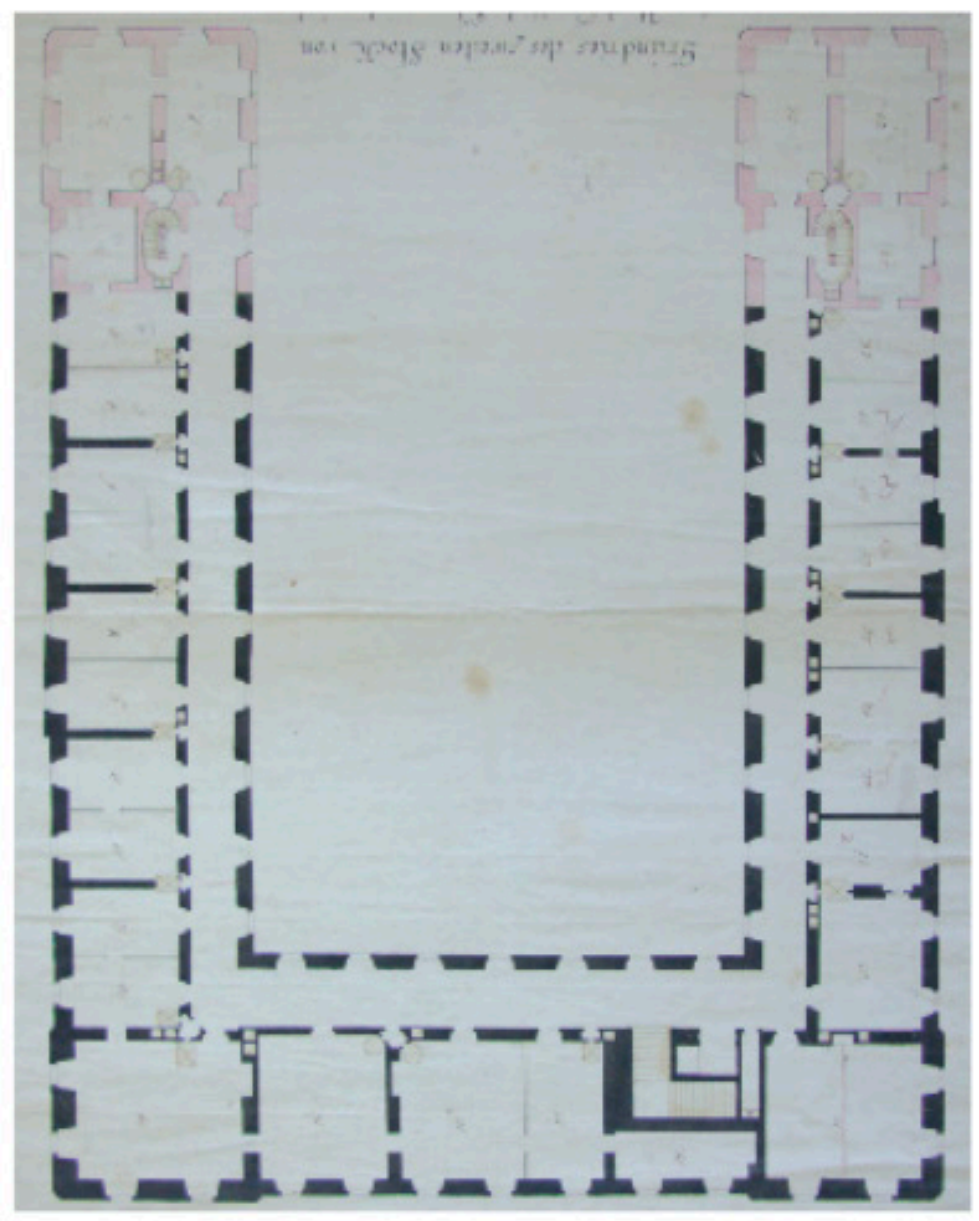
Floor plan reconstruction proposal Andreas Zach (1783)

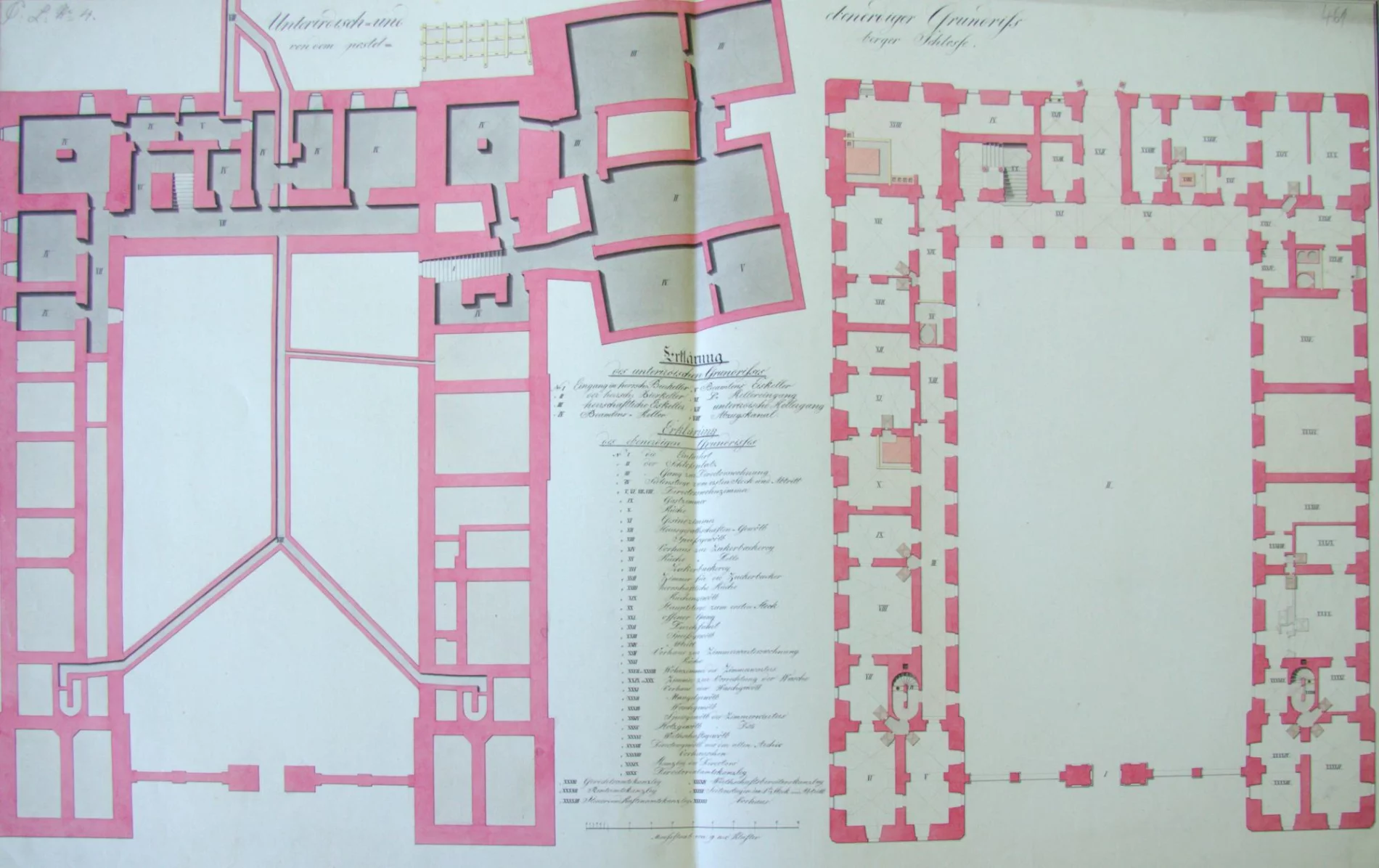
19th century floor plan of the castle

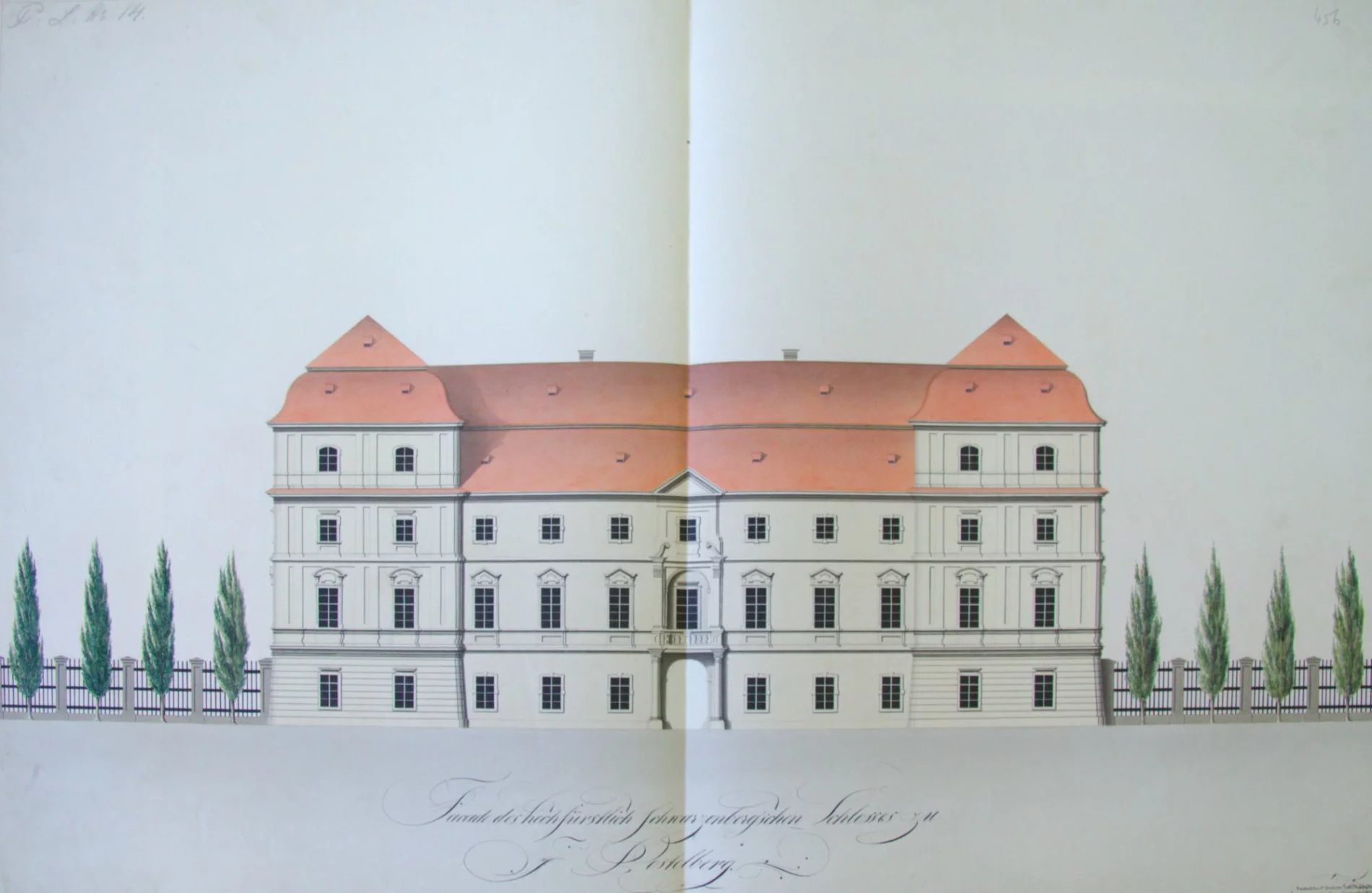
Castle façade

== Literature ==
- Sedláček, August (2000). "Postoloprty zámek". Hrady, zámky a tvrze Království českého. Litoměřicko a Žatecko (in Czech). Prague: Jiří Čížek – ViGo agency. pp. 414–415.
- Vlček, Pavel (2001). "Postoloprty (Louny)". Ilustrovaná encyklopedie českých zámků (in Czech). Prague: Nakladatelství Libri. pp. 418–419. ISBN 8072770284.
- Jurik, Pavel (2008). Jihoceské Dominum (in Czech). Praha: Nakladatelstvi Libri. pp. 318–319. ISBN 978-80-7277-359-6.
