= Postoloprty =

- Town
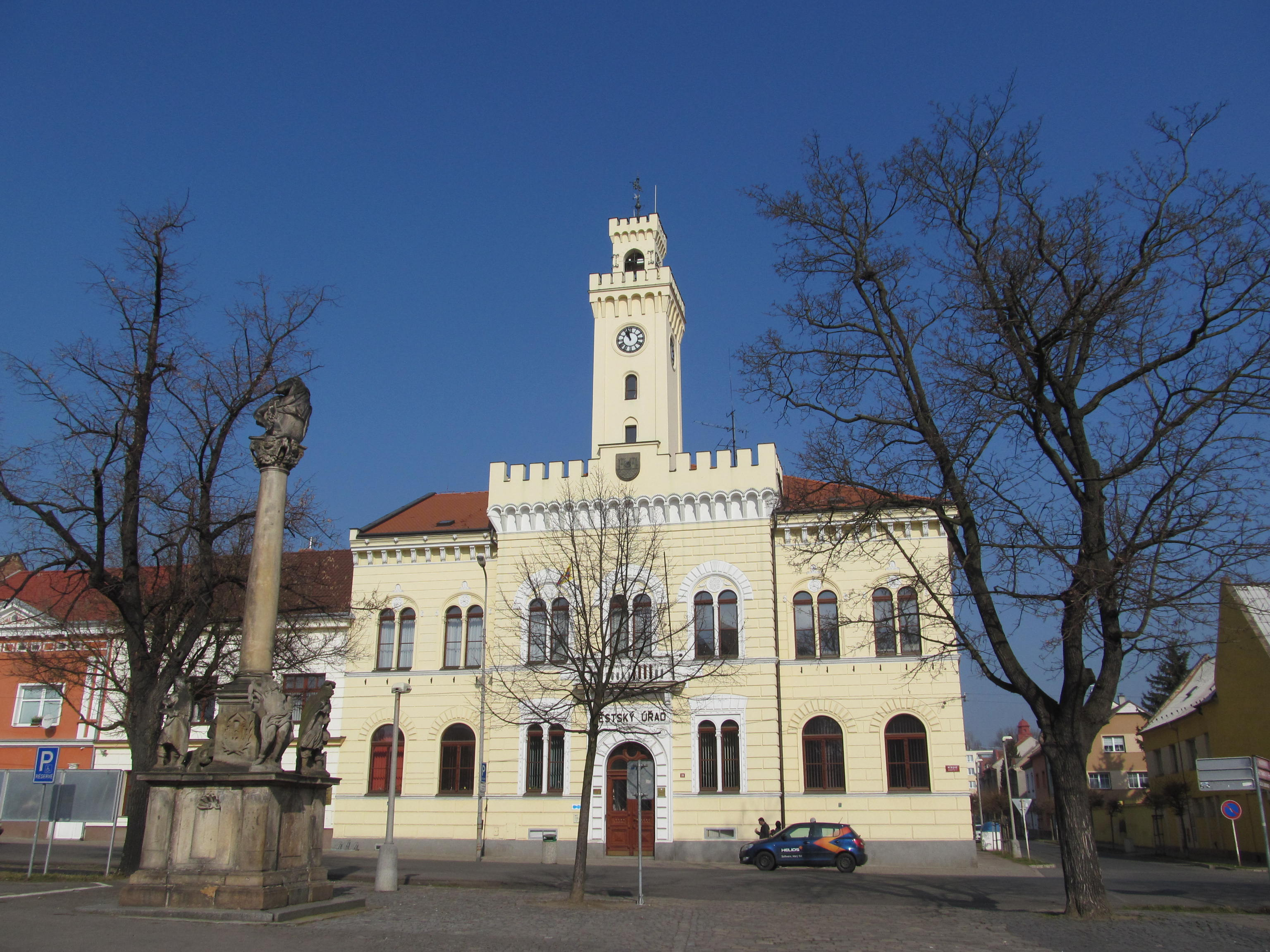
- Town hall

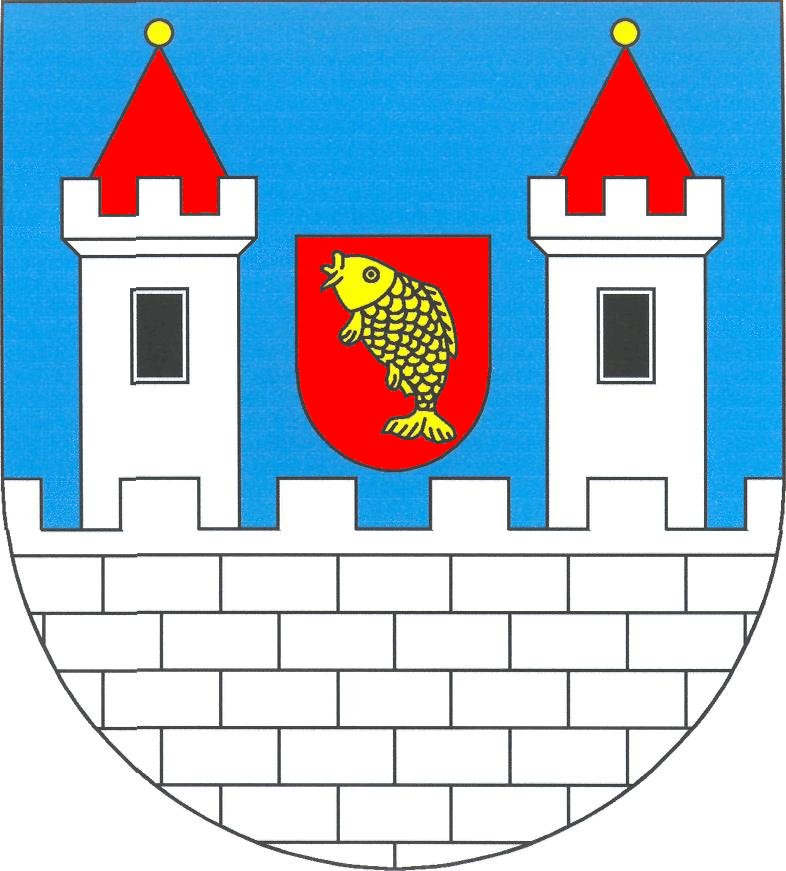
- Flag Coat of arms

- Location in the Czech Republic
- Coordinates: 50°21′38″N 13°41′45″E
- Country: Czech Republic
- Region: Ústí nad Labem
- District: Louny
- First mentioned: 1125

Government
  - Mayor: Zdeněk Pištora

Area
  - Total: 46.49 km^{2} (17.95 sq mi)
- Elevation: 193 m (633 ft)

Population (2026-01-01)
  - Total: 4,661
  - Density: 100.3/km^{2} (259.7/sq mi)
- Time zone: UTC+1 (CET)
  - Summer (DST): UTC+2 (CEST)
- Postal codes: 439 42, 440 01
- Website: www.postoloprty.cz

Postoloprty (Czech pronunciation: [ˈpostolopr̩tɪ]; German: Postelberg) is a town in Louny District in the Ústí nad Labem Region of the Czech Republic. It has about 4,700 inhabitants. The town is located in the Most Basin, at the confluence of the Ohře and Chomutovka rivers. It lies in an agricultural area known for growing Saaz hops.

Postoloprty existed already in the 12th century. During the rule of the Veitmile family in the 16th century, it became a town. Other notable noble owners of the town were the Schwarzenberg family, who owned it from 1692.

== Administrative division ==
Postoloprty consists of 13 municipal parts (in brackets population according to the 2021 census):

- Postoloprty (3,469)
- Březno (320)
- Dolejší Hůrky (34)
- Hradiště (46)
- Levonice (42)
- Malnice (138)
- Mradice (76)
- Rvenice (137)
- Seletice (44)
- Seménkovice (34)
- Skupice (140)
- Strkovice (112)
- Vrbka (67)

Dolejší Hůrky forms an exclave of the municipal territory.

== Etymology ==
The town's name was probably derived from the Latin name of the local monastery, Porta Apostolorum. Another theory says the name was derived from Old Czech prtati postole, meaning 'to repair shoes'. The first written mention of Postoloprty was under the name Postolopirth.

== Geography ==
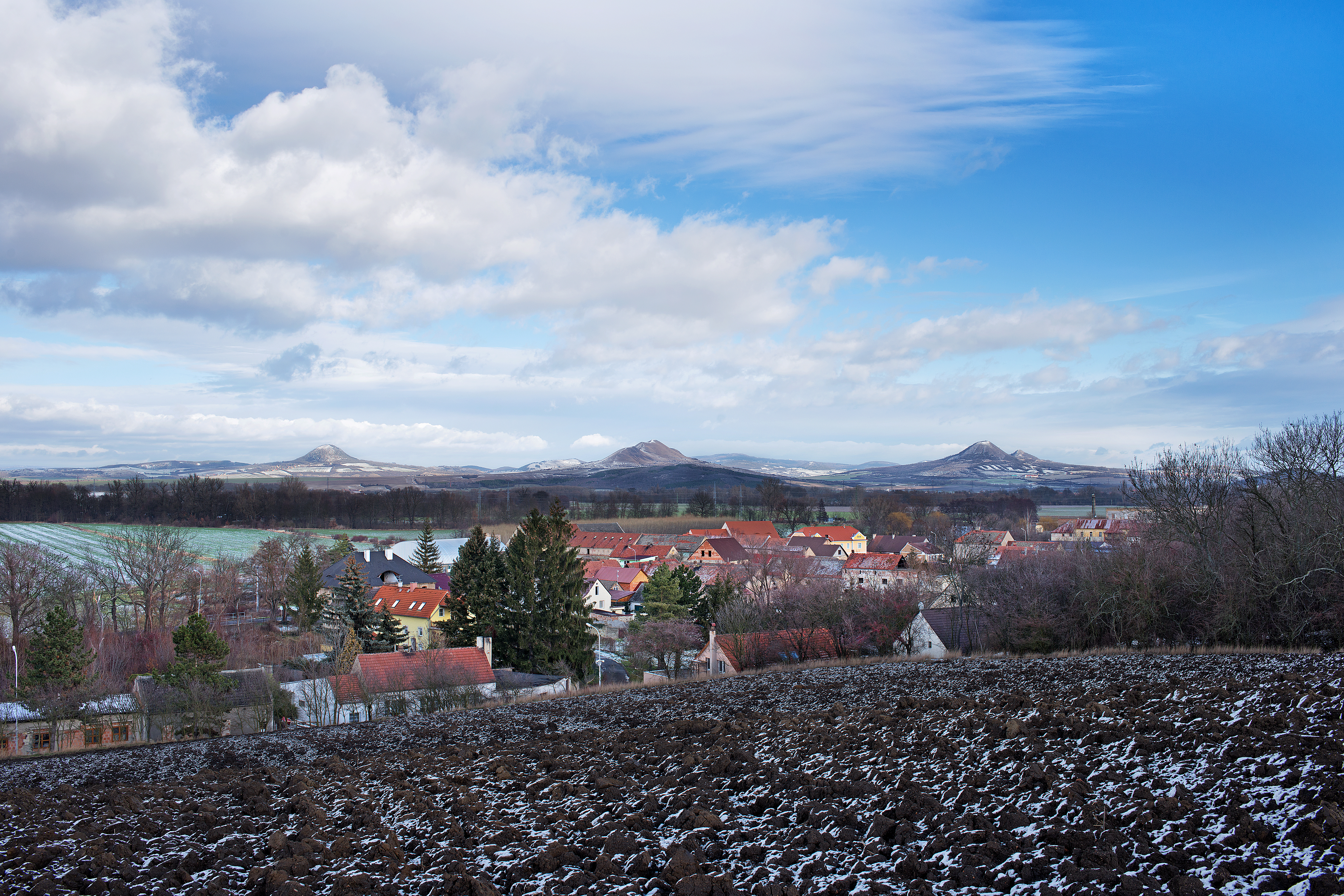
Březno, part of Postoloprty

Postoloprty is located about 7 kilometres (4 mi) west of Louny and 41 km (25 mi) southwest of Ústí nad Labem. It lies mostly in the Most Basin, in an agricultural landscape. The eastern part of the municipal territory with the Březno village lies in the Lower Ohře Table. The town is situated at the confluence of the Ohře and Chomutovka rivers, on the left bank of the Ohře and on the right bank of the Chomutovka.

A distinctive geologic outcrop of the Cretaceous period called Březenské souvrství is located near the village of Březno. Today, it is protected as a nature monument.

== History ==
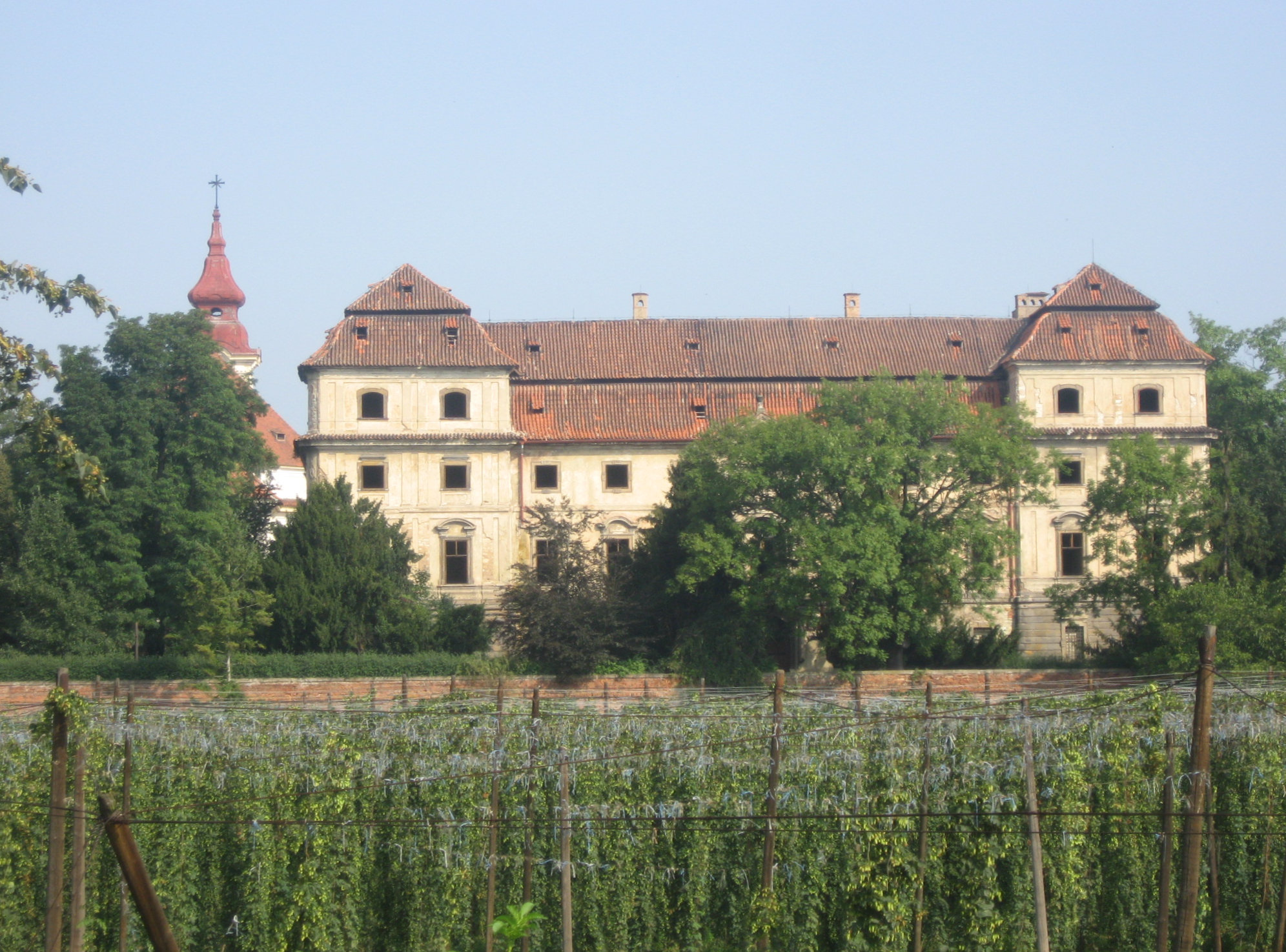
Postoloprty Castle

The settlement was first mentioned in Chronica Boemorum, written in 1119–1125 by Cosmas of Prague. A Benedictine monastery with the Church of the Blessed Virgin Mary was founded here probably at the end of the 11th century. It was built near the site where a former Slavic gord called Drahúš on the Ohře River had been erected at the behest of the Přemyslid dukes. The monastery's premises were devastated during the Hussite Wars in 1420 and not rebuilt.

In 1454, the Bohemian King George of Poděbrady enfeoffed his sons with the Postoloprty estates. The lands were leased to the noble Veitmile (Weitmühl) family in 1480. During their rule, the settlement prospered, and in 1510, it obtained town privileges by King Vladislaus II. In 1611, the owners had the Postoloprty Castle erected at the site of the former monastery. The lordship had passed to the noble Schwarzenberg family in 1692, the family held the premises until 1945.

Upon the 1938 Munich Agreement, the area was annexed by Nazi Germany and incorporated into the Reichsgau Sudetenland. When the region returned to the Czechoslovak Republic at the end of World War II, the remaining German population was expelled according to the Beneš decrees. Outrages culminated in a massacre on 3–7 June 1945, when at least 800 German civilians, mainly men who had been deported to Postoloprty from nearby Žatec, were tortured and shot. The incidents were inquired by a committee of the Czechoslovak parliament in 1947. It is the largest known killing of ethnic Germans by Czechs after World War II. 763 bodies were exhumed but other death toll estimates are higher. The Postoloprty citizens disagreed whether to build a memorial or to not acknowledge the massacre; a memorial plaque, which does not name the perpetrators or the victims, nor the number of victims, was unveiled on 3 June 2010.

== Demographics ==
Historical population

Year	Pop.	±%
1869	5,023	—
1880	5,954	+18.5%
1890	6,154	+3.4%
1900	6,691	+8.7%
1910	6,602	−1.3%

Year	Pop.	±%
1921	6,354	−3.8%
1930	6,251	−1.6%
1950	4,168	−33.3%
1961	3,972	−4.7%
1970	4,889	+23.1%

Year	Pop.	±%
1980	4,886	−0.1%
1991	4,483	−8.2%
2001	4,836	+7.9%
2011	4,813	−0.5%
2021	4,659	−3.2%

Source: Censuses

== Economy ==
The largest employer based in the town is KB – BLOK systém, a producer of concrete products with more than 200 employees.

Postoloprty is located in an agricultural area known for growing Saaz hops.

== Transport ==
A section of the D7 motorway runs through the town.

Postoloprty lies on the Žatec–Most railway line and is the terminus and starting point of the Česká Lípa–Postoloprty line.

== Sights ==
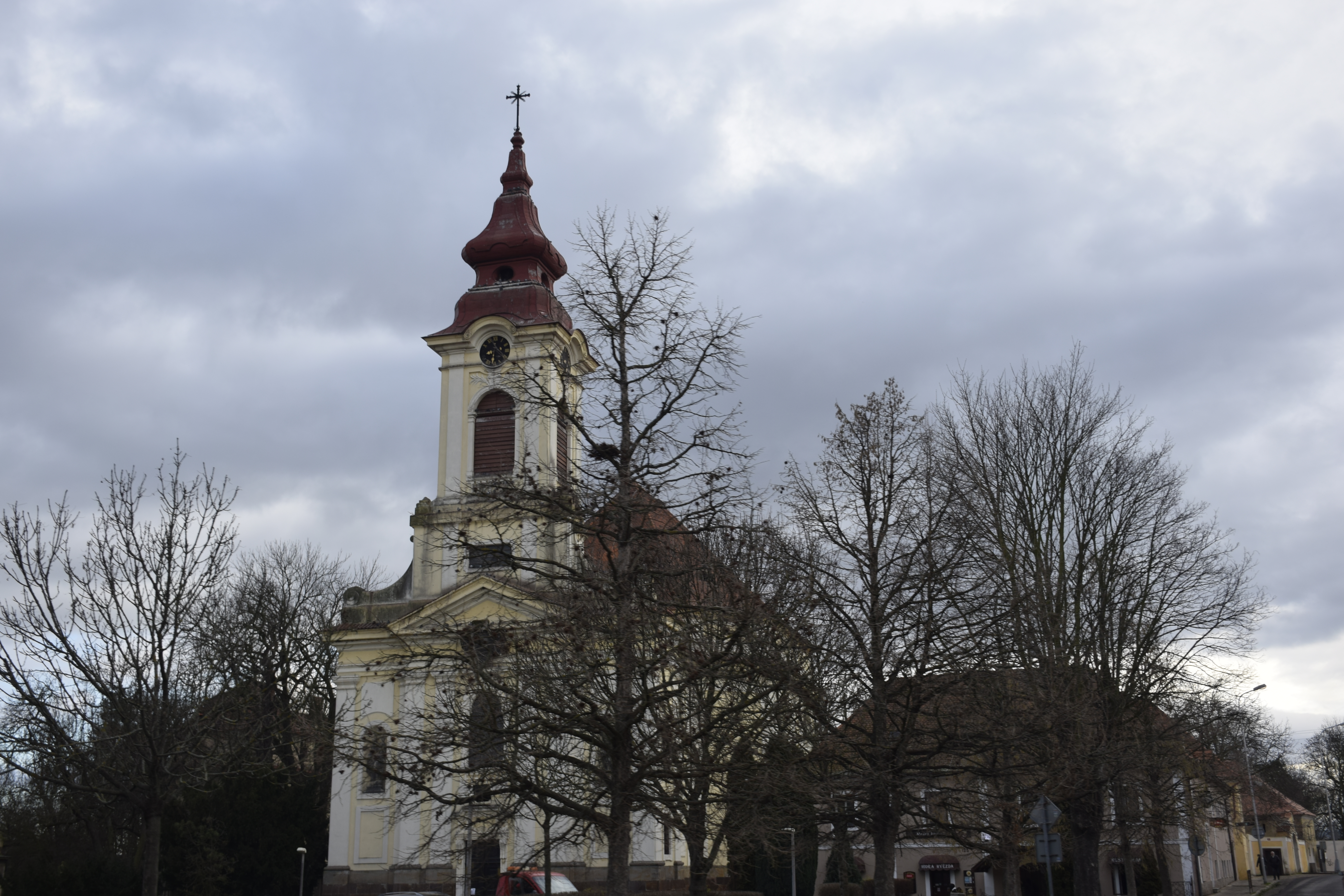
Church of the Assumption of the Virgin Mary

The main landmark of Postoloprty is the Church of the Assumption of the Virgin Mary. This Baroque church was built in 1746–1753.

The Postoloprty Castle was rebuilt in the Baroque style in 1706–1718. Its present appearance is the result of the reconstruction in 1772–1790, after it was damaged by a fire. It is surrounded by a castle garden. Today the castle is unused and fell into desrepair.

== Notable people ==
- Antonín Langweil (1791–1837), artist and model maker
- Julius Anton Glaser (1831–1885), Austrian jurist and politician
- Eduard Bacher (1846–1908), Austrian jurisconsult and journalist
- Adolf Dobrovolný (1864–1934), actor and radio announcer
- Jan Burka (1924–2009), artist

== Twin towns – sister cities ==
Postoloprty is twinned with:

- Wolkenstein, Germany
