= Joseph Matthäus Aigner =

Austrian painter (1818–1886)

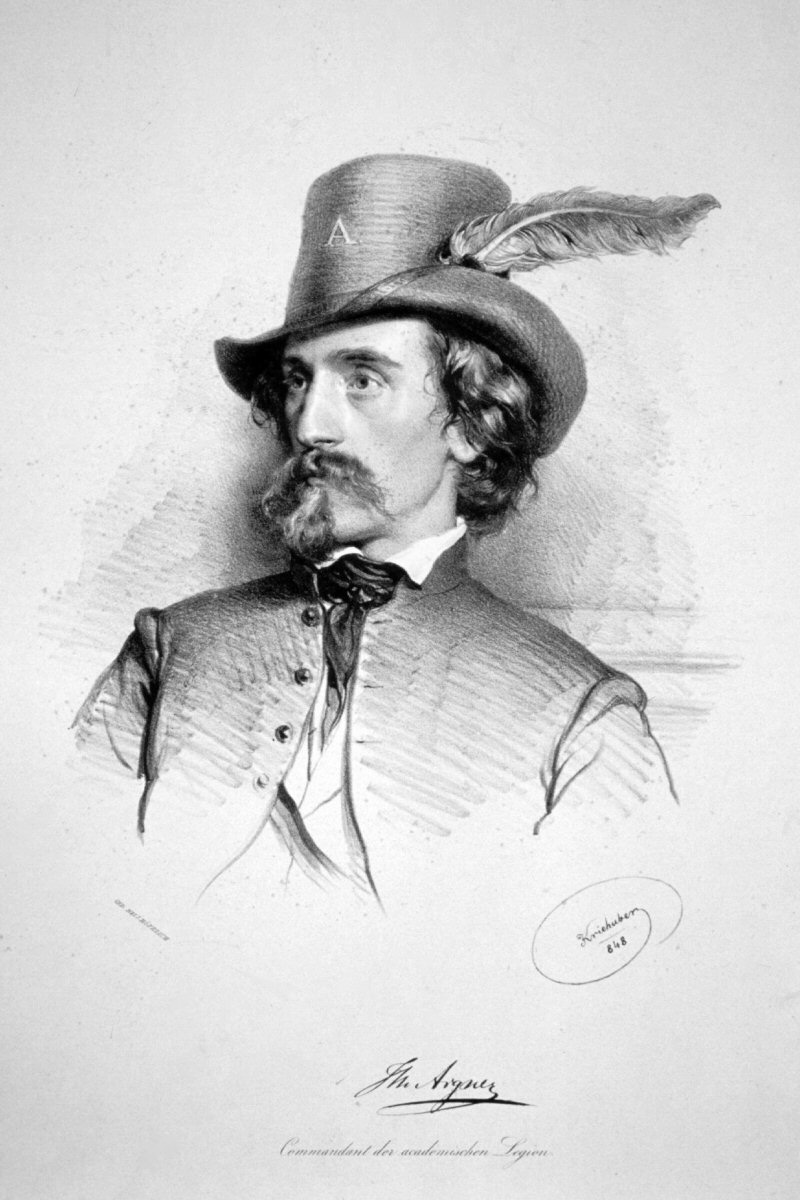
Joseph Matthäus Aigner, a lithograph by Joseph Kriehuber, 1848

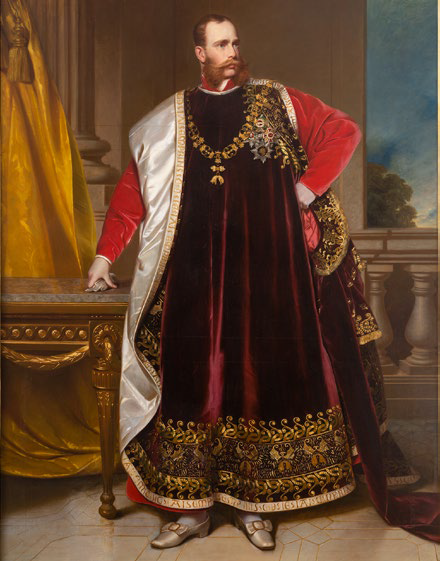
Emperor Franz Joseph in the Regalia of the Golden Fleece, 1868

Joseph Matthäus Aigner (18 January 1818 – 19 February 1886) was an Austrian portrait painter.

== Life ==
Aigner was born on 18 January 1818 in Vienna. He studied under Friedrich von Amerling and Carl Rahl. He painted portraits of Franz Joseph I of Austria and his wife Elizabeth, Franz Grillparzer, Friedrich Halm, Nikolaus Lenau, and Maximilian I of Mexico.

In 1847 he married actress Fanny Matras (1828–1878).

As commander of the Academic Legion during the 1848 revolutions in Vienna, Aigner was court-martialed for high treason and condemned to death. However, Alfred I, Prince of Windisch-Grätz pardoned him.

According to Ripley's Believe It or Not!, a Capuchin friar, whose name Aigner never knew, saved his life three times, when he attempted to hang himself at ages 18 and 22 and when he was sentenced to death. Aigner killed himself with a pistol in Vienna on 19 February 1886, and the same friar presided over his funeral.

== Works ==
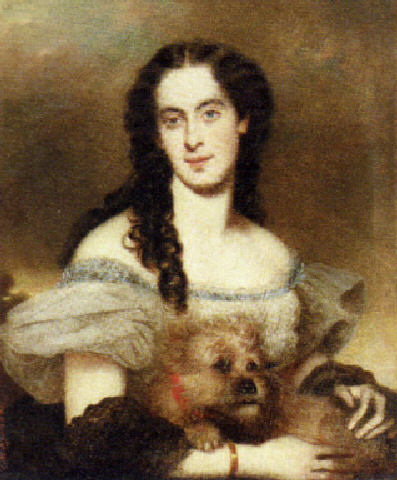
Portrait of a lady with her dog (1863)

- Portrait einer jungen blonden Dame mit Stirnlocken (18??)
- Portrait of a lady with her dog (1863)
- Portrait of Clementina Weyl (1865)
- Portrait of a young boy wearing a coloured sash (1876)
