= Adolf Dobrovolný =

Czech actor and radio reporter (1864–1934)

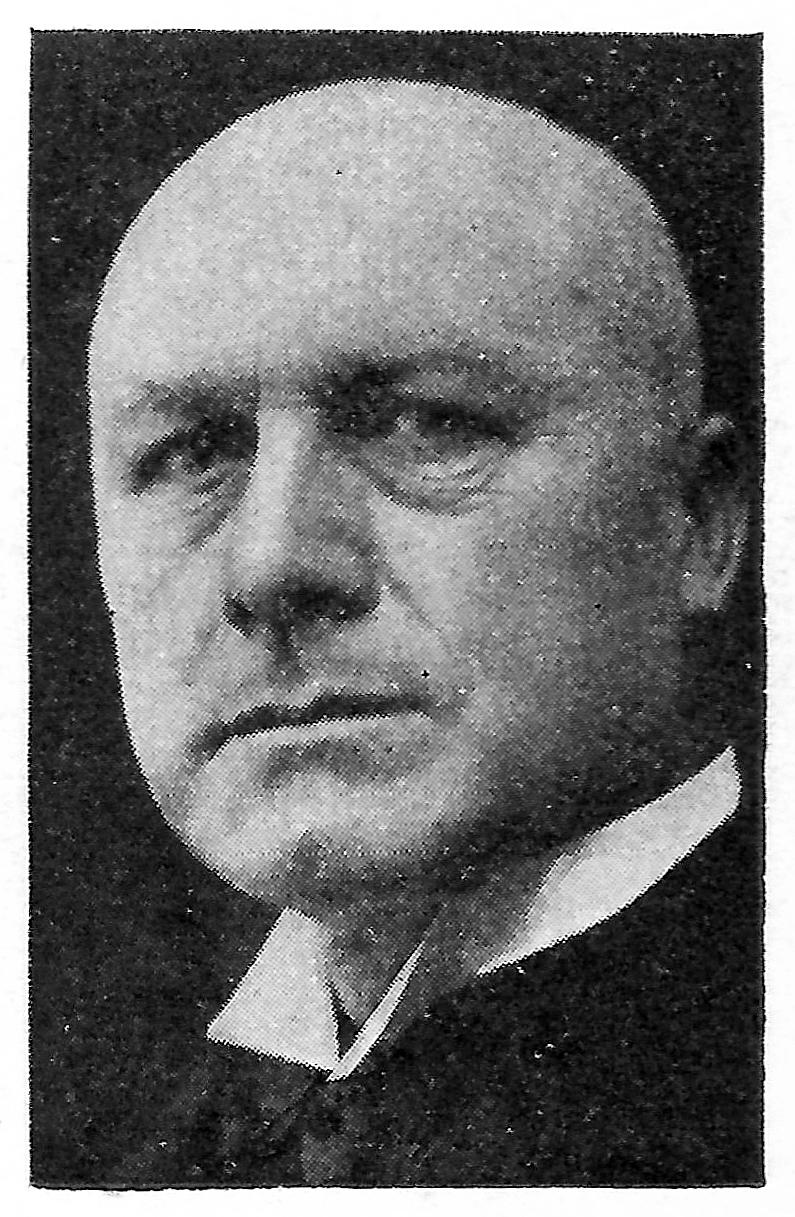
Adolf Dobrovolný

Adolf Dobrovolný (8 May 1864 – 17 January 1934) was a Czech actor and a radio announcer, the first regular radio news reporter in Czechoslovakia.

== Early life and theatre career ==
Dobrovolný was born in Postoloprty, a small town on the Czech–German language border in Bohemia, then part of the Austrian Empire. His father was a watchmaker, and Adolf was taught the craft which he also practised for several years. At the age of 19 he joined an itinerant theater, and in 1897 he started to act in Švanda Theatre, Smíchov, Prague. From 1900 to 1906 he was a director and actor at Slovene National Theatre in Ljubljana (then in the Slovenian part of the Austrian Empire). In time, he also played several roles in the Croatian National Theatre in Zagreb and also the role of Napoleon in Madame Sans-Gêne at National Theatre in Prague. He was one of the founding members of Vinohrady Theatre in 1907. In 1914 he left for Ljubljana again to work as a drama and operetta director. From 1919 to 1924 he worked for Karel Hašler as a comedian and host at Cabaret Lucerna (today Lucerna Music Bar).

== Radio and film career ==
He spent the last decade of his life (1924–1934) working for Radiojournal, the first Czechoslovak radio station established in 1923. He was a popular announcer who became the station's first regular reporter who prepared and presented the news from the daily papers. He also arranged poetic and literal programmes and directed several radio plays.

On 2 August 1924 he did the first live broadcast of a sports event in Europe – the heavyweight boxing match between Frank Rosse (Czechoslovakia) and Harry (Rocky) Knight (United Kingdom) in Prague. He was not at the venue but got the description of the match via telephone and then relayed it to the listeners.

His voice and figure with a round bald head was used in five silent and two sound films. He was the first to dub a documentary for Czech cinema – a humorous wildlife film Dassan: An Adventure in Search of Laughter featuring Nature’s Greatest Little Comedians (Cherry Kearton, 1930).

== Private life and death ==
He married Saša Kokošková (1866–1942), a theatre and film actress. He died on 17 January 1934 in Prague and was buried at Olšany Cemetery.

== See also ==
- Czech Radio
