= Academic Legion (Vienna) =

Revolutionary students' group in Vienna in 1848

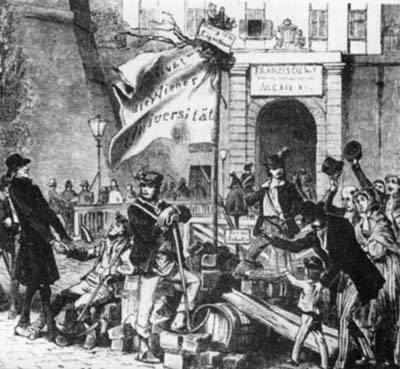
Viennese students took the street in 1848.

The Academic Legion (German: Akademische Legion) was a military organization formed by university students in Vienna during the Revolutions of 1848. It played a key role in toppling the government of Clemens Metternich and precipitating his retirement on 13 March 1848. The Legion dissolved in October 1848 when the Vienna Uprising was crushed.

== History ==
The Legion, formed in 1848, was composed of about 6,000 university students. Although students were well represented in the revolutionary vanguard of most cities affected by the revolution during this time, nowhere had the university students played so important and prominent a part in the revolutionary movement as in Vienna. The students exercised a preponderant influence in the “central committee,” the administrative body of the revolutionaries, which consisted of an equal number of students and members of the citizens' militia. Deputations of citizens and peasants came from all parts of Austria to present their grievances and petitions to the "Aula", the headquarters of the students, which had suddenly risen as an authority omnipotent in the opinion of the multitude.

When the imperial ministry was about to promulgate a new press law, which abolished the censorship but still contained many restrictions, its chief, Franz von Pillersdorf, requested the students to express their judgment about that law. And on 15 May 1848 the students, at the head of the revolutionaries, obligated the government to revoke the constitution it had imposed, and to promise the convocation of a constituent assembly to formulate a new constitution. The students successfully fended off various attempts of the government to dissolve their organization. They compelled the ministry to agree to the removal of the soldiery from the city of Vienna and to the formation of a committee of public safety, which was to consist principally of the members of the students' organization. So independent and so comprehensive a power was confided to it that in several important respects it was the equal of the ministry. Without its consent, for instance, no military force should be employed in the city. Thus it might have been said without much exaggeration that for a certain time the students of Vienna governed Austria.

In his Reminiscences, Carl Schurz describes the uniforms of the Academic Legion worn by the Viennese representatives at the Eisenach Student Conference of 25 September - 4 October 1848:

... black felt hats with ostrich plumes, blue coats with black shining buttons, tricolored, black-red-gold sashes, bright steel-handled swords, light-gray trousers, and silver-gray cloaks lined with scarlet. They looked like a troop of knights of old.

News of events which would develop into the end of the Legion's domination of Austrian politics came during the course of this conference. In the face of the reports they received, the Viennese representatives returned home. The imperial government had dispatched troops to Hungary to quell disturbances there. In response, the Viennese revolutionaries took to the streets. They lynched the imperial minister of war, Theodor Franz, Count Baillet von Latour, and drove government troops under Count Auersperg from the city. On 23 October, Austrian field marshal Alfred Windischgrätz arrived with a large body of reinforcements, and by 31 October the rebellion was crushed, the Legion members having all fled or been killed or captured.

== List of members ==
- Joseph Matthäus Aigner
- Hans Balatka
- Adolf Fischhof
- Robert Hamerling
- Friedrich Hassaurek
- Eduard Lasker

It is debated whether Oswald Ottendorfer was involved or not.

== See also ==
- Vienna Uprising
- Revolutions of 1848 in the Habsburg areas
