= Joseph Unger =

Austrian jurist and politician (1828–1913)

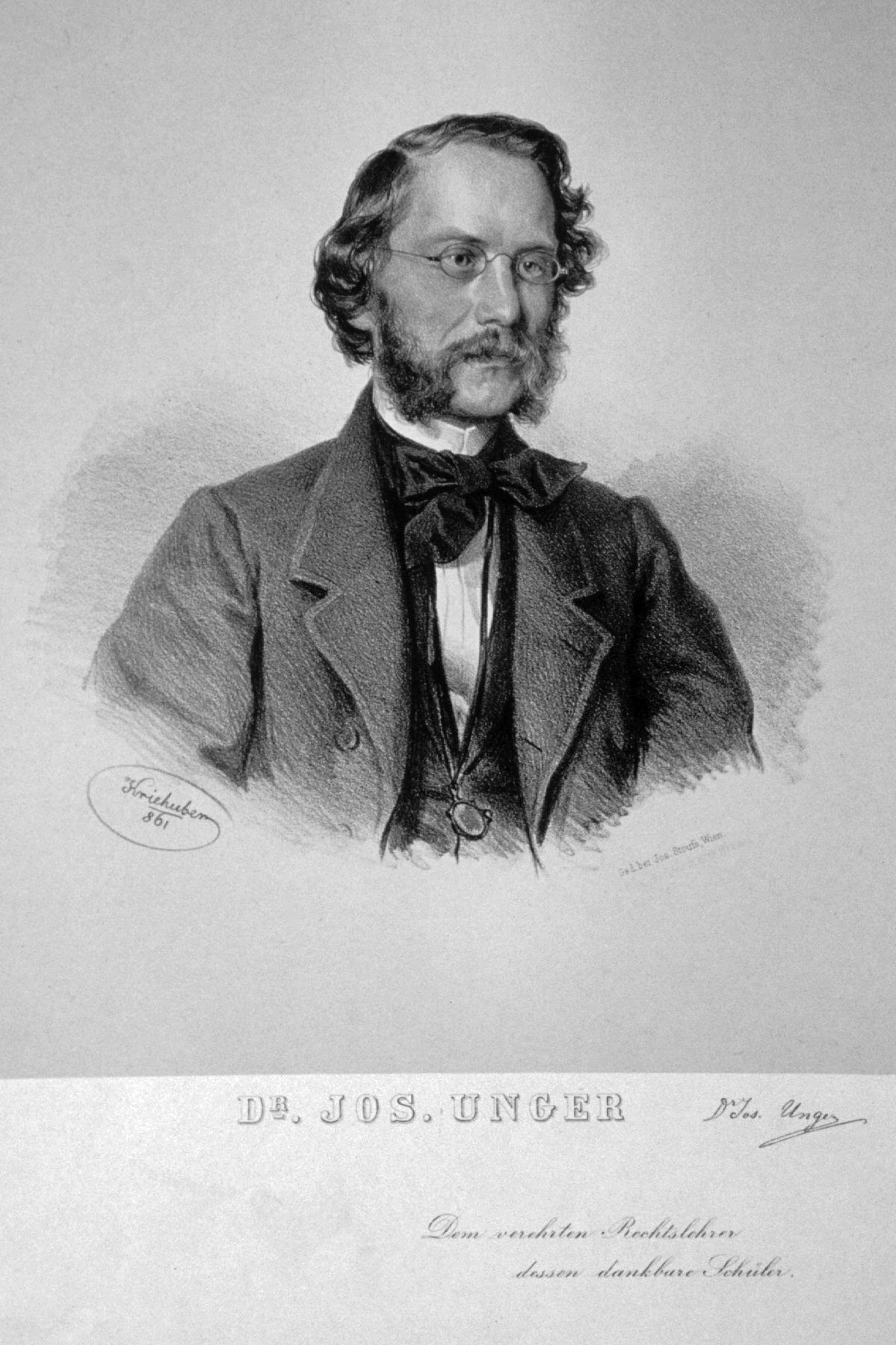
- Joseph Unger.
- Born: 2 July 1828; Vienna, Austria
- Died: 12 May 1913 (aged 84); Vienna, Austria-Hungary
- Occupation: Jurist

Joseph Unger (2 July 1828 – 12 May 1913) was an Austrian jurist and statesman. Having studied law at the university of his native city, he in 1850 was appointed assistant librarian, and in 1852 privatdozent, at his alma mater. The following year he was called to Prague as assistant professor at the university, and in 1855 to Vienna in a similar capacity. In 1857, he was appointed professor of jurisprudence at the latter institution. In 1867, he was successively elected a member of the Austrian Landtag and of the Reichsrat; but on account of ill health he had to resign in the following year. Appointed in 1869 by the Emperor Franz Joseph a life-member of the House of Lords, he soon became the whip of the Liberal Party. Two years later, he became minister (without portfolio) in Prince Auersperg's cabinet, but resigned upon the prime minister's defeat in 1879. In 1881 he was appointed president of the Reichsgericht (Supreme Court of Administration). Unger converted from Judaism to Roman Catholicism in 1852.

== Literary works ==
Of Unger's works the following may be mentioned:

- Die Ehe in Ihrer welthistorischen Entwicklung (Vienna, 1850)
- Ueber Wissenschaftliche Behandlung des Oesterreichischen Gemeinen Privatrechtes (1853)
- Der Entwurf eines Bürgerlichen Gesetzbuches für das Königreich Sachsen (1853)
- System des Oesterreichischen Allgemeinen Privatrechts (Leipzig, 1856–64; vols. i and ii, 5th ed., 1892; vol. vi, 1894)
  a standard work on Austrian law, which established Unger's reputation
- Die Rechtliche Natur der Inhaberpapiere (Vienna, 1857)
- Der Revidierte Entwurf eines Bürgerlichen Gesetzbuches für das Königreich Sachsen (1861)
- Zur Lösung der Ungarischen Frage (1861; written in collaboration with Adolf Fischhof, and published anonymously), a work advocating a dual monarchy for Austria and Hungary, its appearance marking Unger's entry upon a political career
- Die Verlassenschaftsabhandlung in Oesterreich (1865);
- Zur Reform der Wiener Universität (1865);
- Die Verträge zu Gunsten Dritter (Jena, 1869);
- Schuldübernahme (Vienna, 1889);
- Handeln auf Eigene Gefahr (Jena, 1891);
- Handeln auf Fremde Gefahr (1894);
