= Údlice =

- Municipality
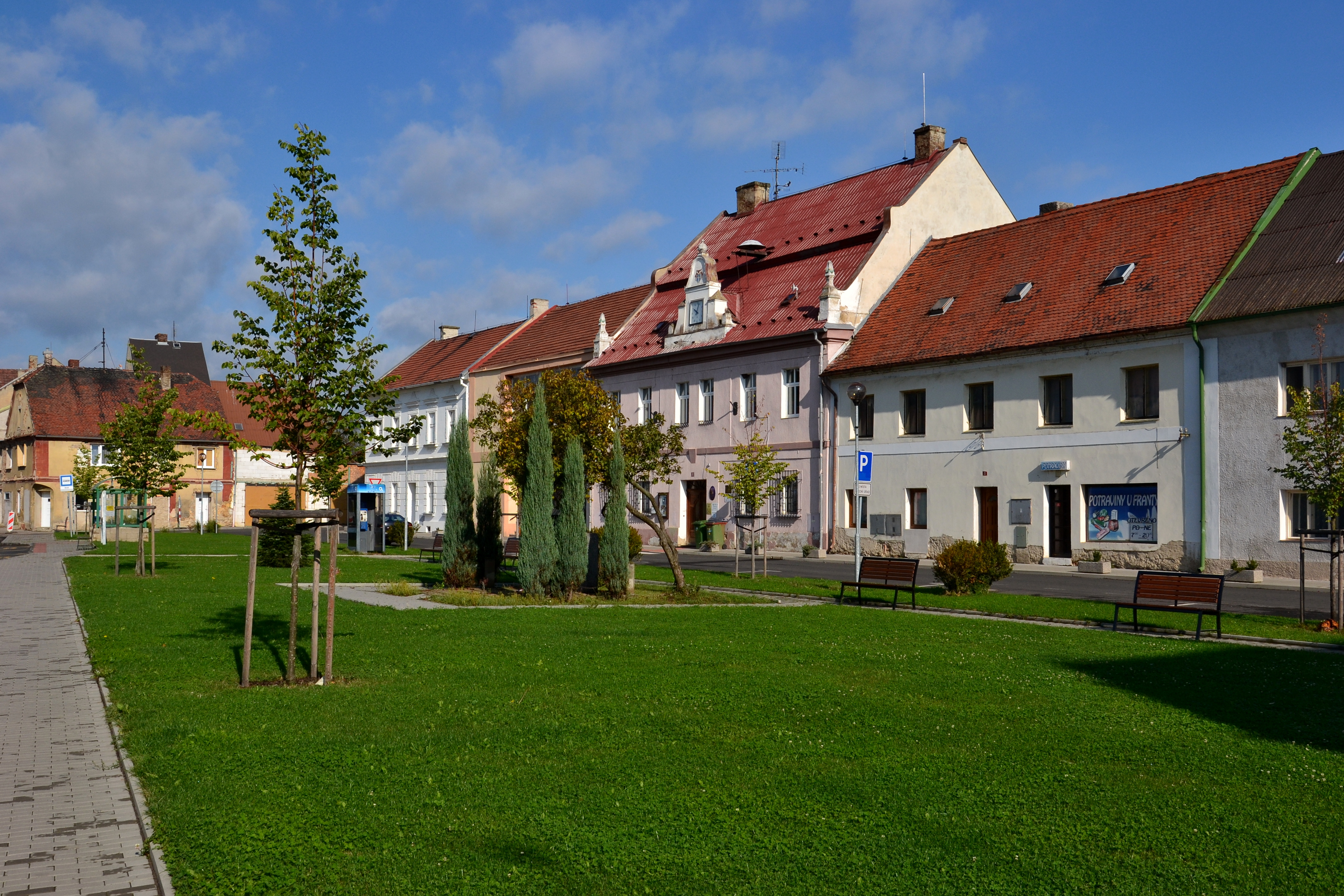
- Northern part of the square

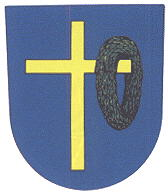
- Coat of arms

- Location in the Czech Republic
- Coordinates: 50°26′27″N 13°27′27″E
- Country: Czech Republic
- Region: Ústí nad Labem
- District: Chomutov
- First mentioned: 1247

Area
  - Total: 11.86 km^{2} (4.58 sq mi)
- Elevation: 287 m (942 ft)

Population (2026-01-01)
  - Total: 1,325
  - Density: 111.7/km^{2} (289.4/sq mi)
- Time zone: UTC+1 (CET)
  - Summer (DST): UTC+2 (CEST)
- Postal code: 431 41
- Website: www.obec-udlice.cz

Údlice (German: Eidlitz) is a municipality and village in Chomutov District in the Ústí nad Labem Region of the Czech Republic. It has about 1,300 inhabitants.

== Administrative division ==
Údlice consists of two municipal parts (in brackets population according to the 2021 census):

- Údlice (1,069)
- Přečaply (139)

== Etymology ==
The initial name of the settlement was probably Údolnice (derived from the Czech word údolí, i.e. 'valley') The name was transcribed to German as Udelitz. Later the German name was transcribed back to Czech as Údlice (formerly written as Oudlice).

== Geography ==
Údlice is located in close proximity to the city of Chomutov, about 47 km (29 mi) southwest of Ústí nad Labem. It lies in the Most Basin. The highest point is at 367 m (1,204 ft) above sea level. The Chomutovka River flows through the municipality.

== History ==
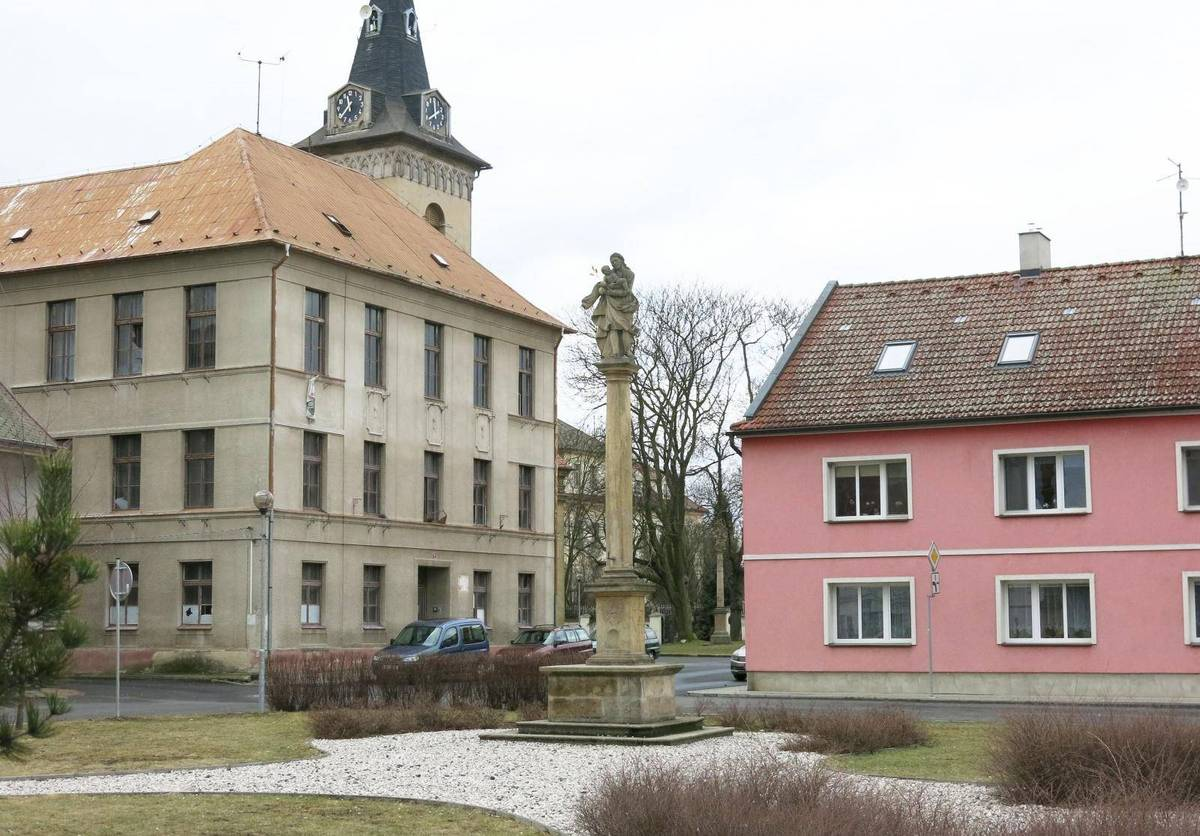
Column with a statue of St. Joseph

The first written mention of Údlice is from 1295. From 1446 until the end of the 16th century, the village was owned by the Lobkowicz family. Údlice was promoted to a town in 1539, but its lost the title during the Thirty Years' War, when it was plundered by the Swedish army. From 1605 until the establishment of a separate municipality, Údlice was part of the Červený Hrádek estate and shared its owners.

From 1938 to 1945, Údlice was annexed by Nazi Germany and administered as part of the Reichsgau Sudetenland.

== Demographics ==
Historical population

Year	Pop.	±%
1869	2,007	—
1880	2,122	+5.7%
1890	2,403	+13.2%
1900	2,289	−4.7%
1910	2,513	+9.8%

Year	Pop.	±%
1921	2,666	+6.1%
1930	2,979	+11.7%
1950	1,444	−51.5%
1961	1,544	+6.9%
1970	1,295	−16.1%

Year	Pop.	±%
1980	1,037	−19.9%
1991	966	−6.8%
2001	1,001	+3.6%
2011	1,057	+5.6%
2021	1,208	+14.3%

Source: Censuses

== Transport ==
There are no railways or major roads passing through the municipal territory, but the municipality is located close to the D7 motorway from Prague to Chomutov.

== Sights ==
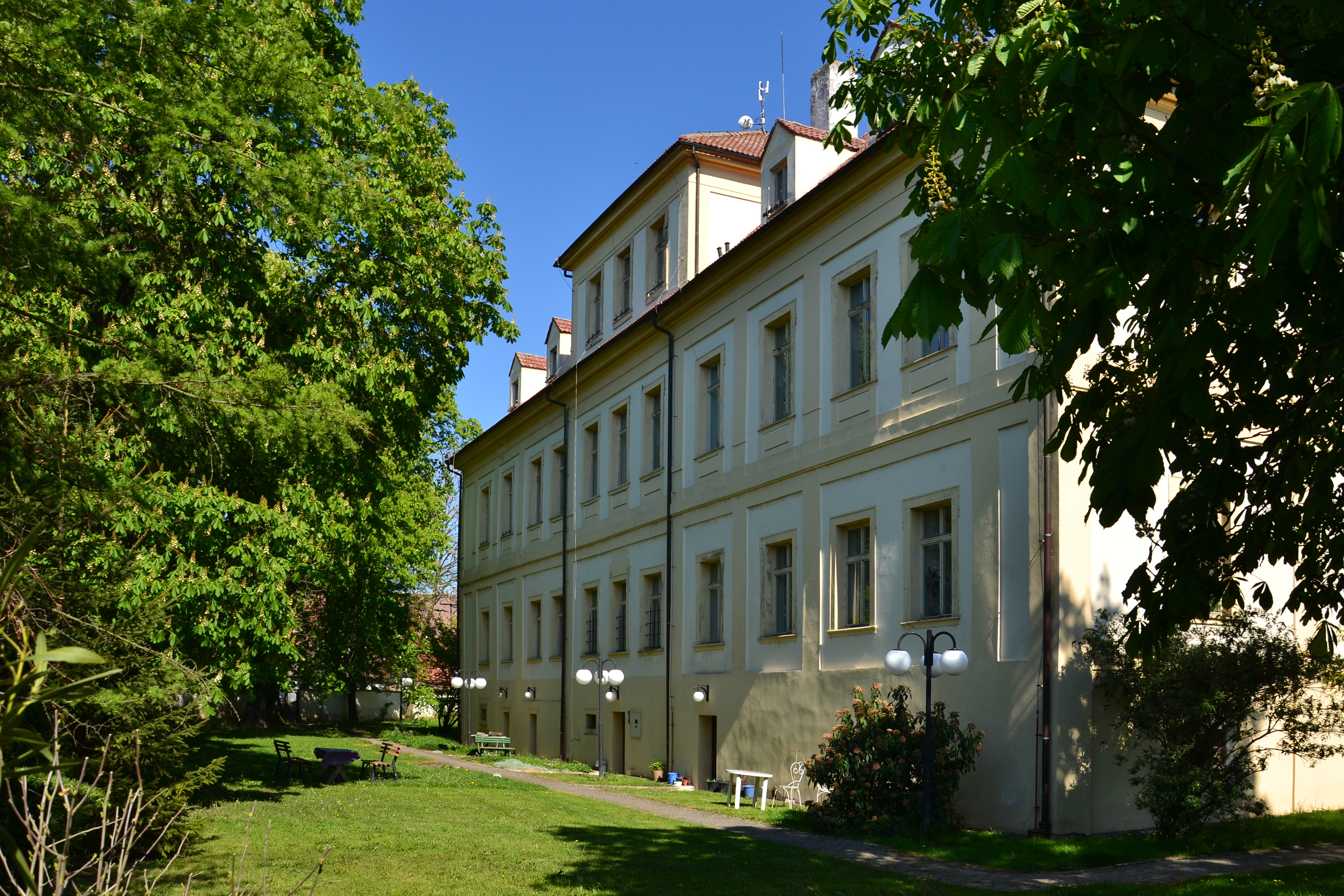
Údlice Castle

The Church of the Exaltation of the Holy Cross is originally a Romanesque church from the first half of the 13th century. It was rebuilt in 1400, and then into its current early Baroque form in the 17th century.

The Údlice Castle was built in the Baroque style in 1692–1695 on the site of a fortress from the 14th century. Today the building is used by a secondary school.

The column with a statue of Saint Joseph in the middle of the square dates from 1716.
