= Chomutovka =

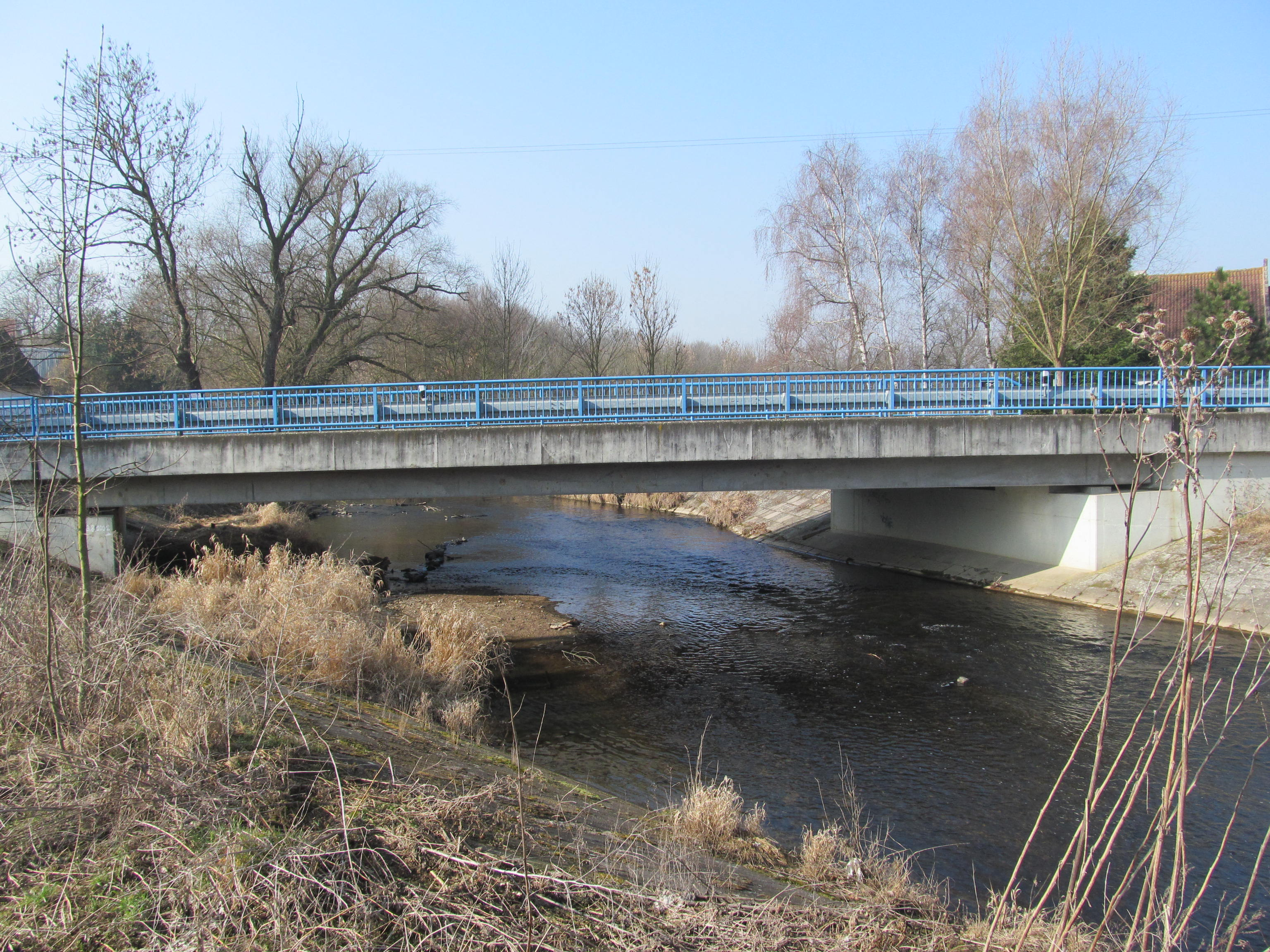
- The Chomutovka at Postoloprty

Location
- Country: Czech Republic
- Region: Ústí nad Labem

Physical characteristics
- Source
  - location: Hora Svatého Šebestiána, Ore Mountains
  - coordinates: 50°30′15″N 13°13′40″E
  - elevation: 863 m (2,831 ft)
- Mouth
  - location: Ohře
  - coordinates: 50°21′45″N 13°43′5″E
  - elevation: 181 m (594 ft)
- Length: 50.4 km (31.3 mi)
- Basin size: 185.7 km^{2} (71.7 sq mi)
- Discharge
  - average: 1.02 m^{3}/s (36 cu ft/s) near estuary

Basin features
- Progression: Ohře→ Elbe→ North Sea

The Chomutovka Czech pronunciation: [ˈxomutofka] is a river in the Czech Republic, a left tributary of the Ohře River. It flows through the Ústí nad Labem Region. It is 50.4 km (31.3 mi) long.

== Etymology ==
The river is named after the city of Chomutov.

== Characteristic ==
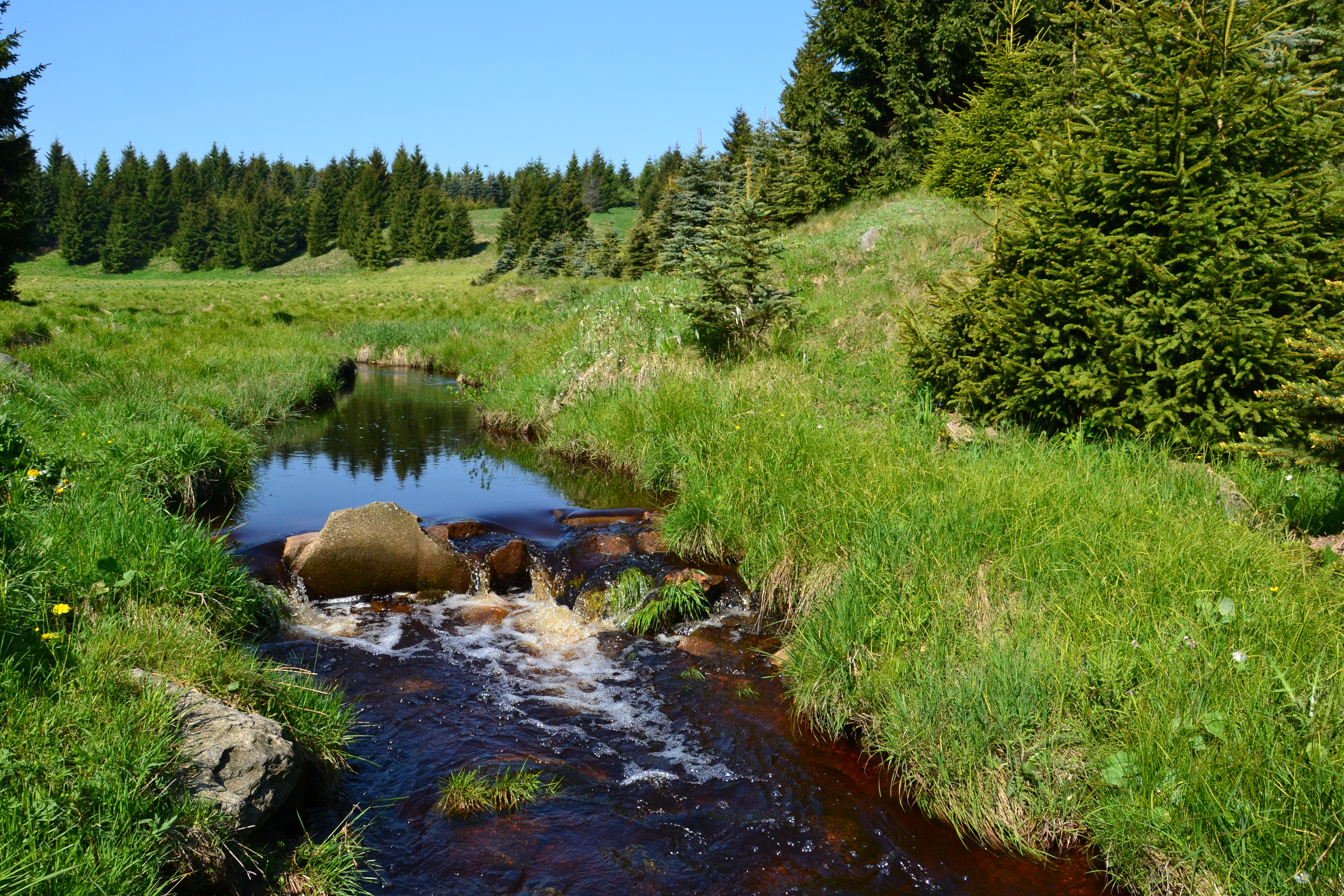
Upper course of the river

The Chomutovka originates in the municipal territory of Hora Svatého Šebestiána in the Ore Mountains at an elevation of 863 m (2,831 ft) and flows to Postoloprty, where it enters the Ohře River at an elevation of 181 m (594 ft). It is 50.4 km (31.3 mi) long. Its drainage basin has an area of 185.7 km^{2} (71.7 sq mi).

The Chomutovka does not have many tributaries and none is significant. The longest tributaries of the Chomutovka are:

Tributary	Length (km)	Side
Hačka	14.3	right
Velemyšleveský potok	7.6	left
Křímovský potok	6.5	right

The Chomutovka in the area of its source collects water from peat bogs and crosses many artificially constructed channels, so the main source flow cannot be determined. The length of the river is measured from the fishpond Novoveský rybník.

== Course ==
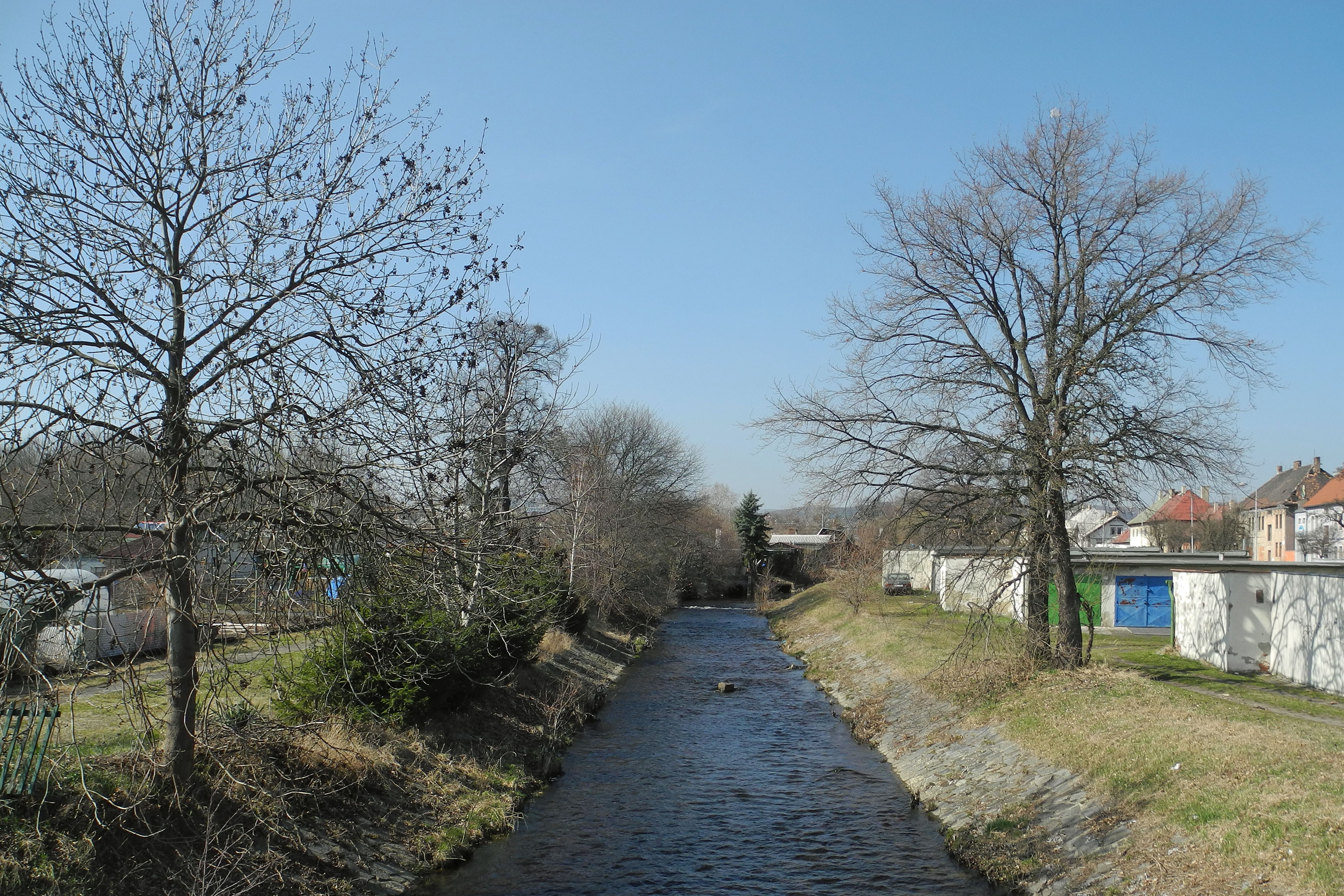
The Chomutovka in Chomutov

The most notable settlement on the river is the city of Chomutov. The river flows through the municipal territories of Hora Svatého Šebestiána, Blatno, Křimov, Chomutov, Údlice, Nezabylice, Bílence, Velemyšleves and Postoloprty.

A 3-metre-high waterfall is located near Hora Svatého Šebestiána. It is a tourist destination to which a marked path leads. About 1.5 km further down the flow there is a second waterfall with a height of 2 m.

Before it reaches Chomutov, the river flows through the mountainous landscape of the Ore Mountains. Starting with Chomutov, it flows through a flat and predominantly agricultural landscape of the Most Basin. The slope of the terrain here is approx. 0.3–0.5%.

== Bodies of water ==
There are 141 bodies of water in the basin area. There are two small reservoirs in the area of the upper course, but the largest water bodies are around the middle course near Chomutov. Novoveský rybník, a small fishpond near the Chomutovka's spring, is the only body of water built directly on the river.

== Floods ==
There is an increased risk of flooding in the section between 23.0 and 31.8 river km, which includes the city of Chomutov and the village of Údlice.

== Protection of nature ==
A large area of 1,881.8 ha (4,650 acres) in the spring area of the Chomutovka is protected as Prameniště Chomutovky Nature Reserve. The subject of protection are marshes and bogs, forest cover typical of these biotopes, and the occurrence of rare species of plants and animals.

Another part of the upper course (before it reaches Chomutov) flows through a valley that is protected as Bezručovo údolí Nature Monument. It has an area of 952.7 ha (2,354 acres). The subject of protection is, among other, the occurrence of butterfly species dusky large blue and scarce large blue.

== See also ==
- List of rivers of the Czech Republic
