= Zoopark Chomutov =

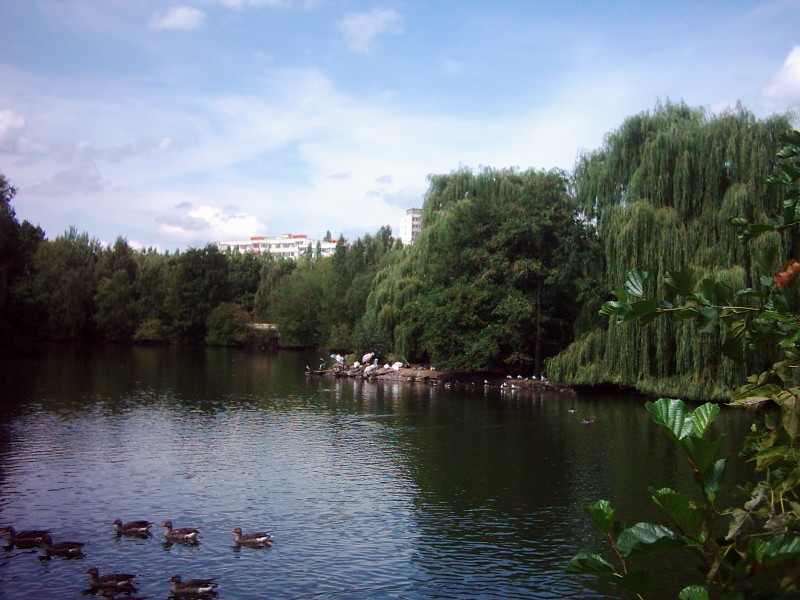
- Interactive map of Zoopark Chomutov
- 50°28′40″N 13°25′21″E
- Date opened: 1975
- Location: Přemyslova 259 430 01 Chomutov
- Land area: 112 hectares
- No. of animals: 1 000
- No. of species: 160
- Website: http://www.zoopark.cz/

Zoopark Chomutov is a Czech zoo located on the outskirts of Chomutov in Ústí nad Labem Region, Czech Republic.

The zoo holds more than a 1000 individuals of about 160 species, among them 14 species listed as endangered in European rescue programs. Zoopark Chomutov is also connected to the National Grid stations for handicapped animals that provide care for injured wildlife. Those animals are released into the wild after treatment and after-care.
