= Kamencové jezero =

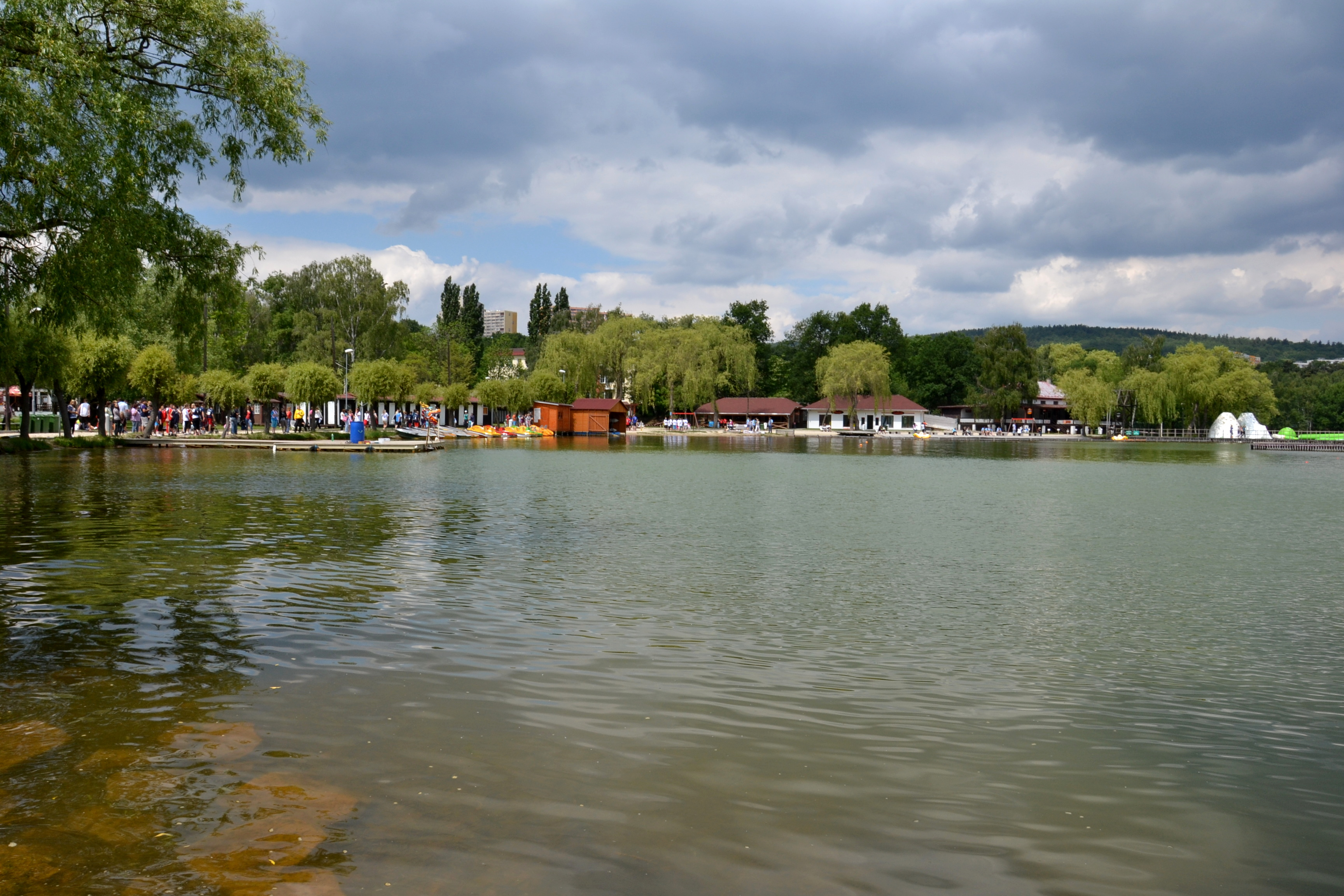
- Kamencové jezero

- Location within Czech Republic
- Location: Chomutov, Czech Republic
- Coordinates: 50°28′21″N 13°25′30″E
- Type: Artificial lake
- Max. length: 676 metres (2,218 ft)
- Max. width: 240 metres (790 ft)
- Surface area: 15.95 hectares (39.4 acres)
- Max. depth: 3.4 metres (11 ft)
- Website: kamencovejezero.cz

Kamencové jezero (lit. 'alum lake') is a lake in the municipal area of Chomutov, Czech Republic. It is artificial in that it came into being due to 18th century mining.

Kamencové jezero, at an altitude of 337 m (1,106 ft), was caused at the end of the 18th century by flooding the mines used between the 16th and 18th centuries. It occupies an area of 15.95 ha and the maximum depth is 3.4 m.

The high content (about 1%) of alum in the water from Kamencové jezero prevents the lake from the growth of weed and anabaena. For that reason it is very frequently visited in the summer months.
