= Červený Hrádek =

- Municipality
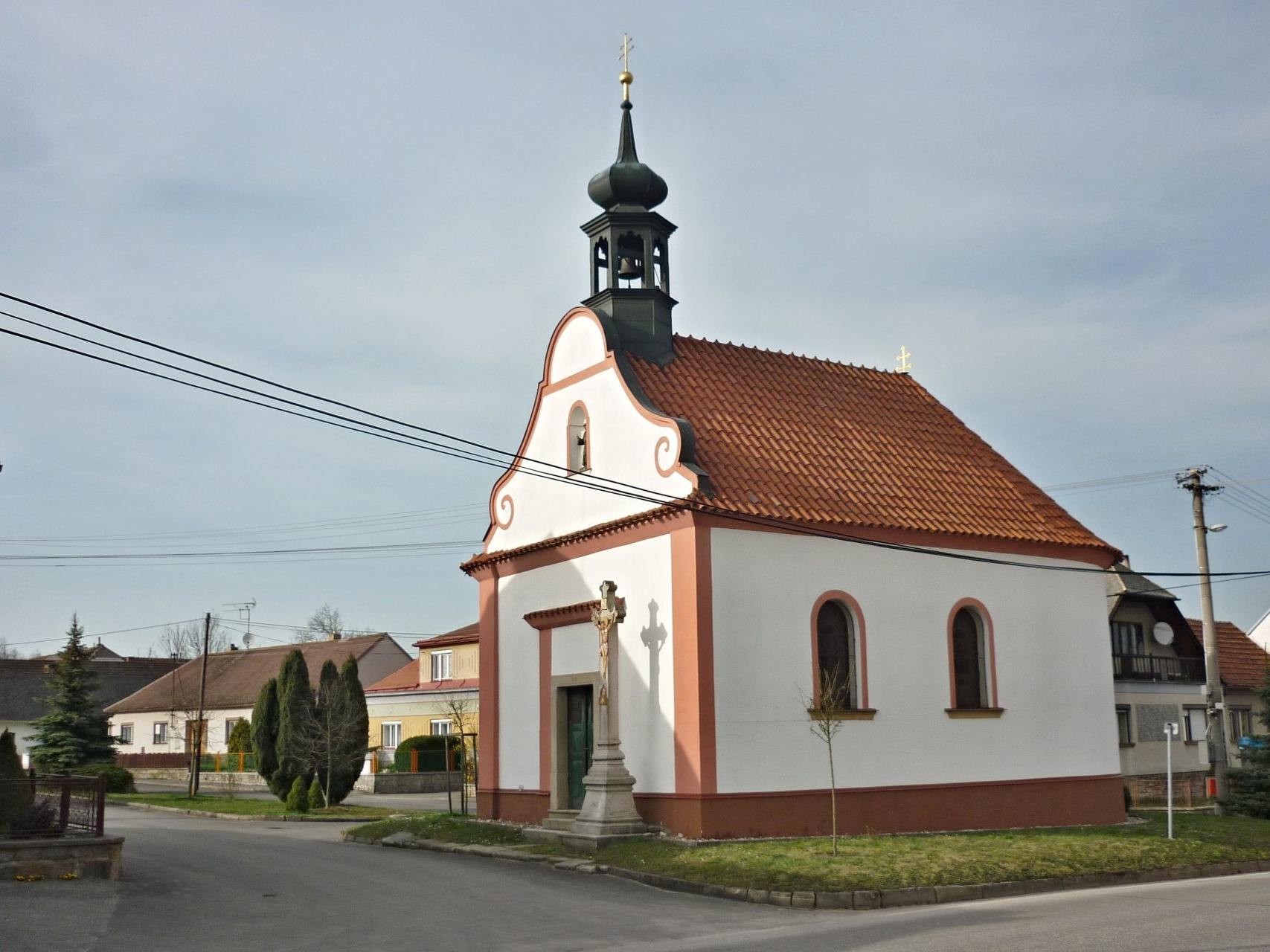
- Chapel of the Virgin Mary

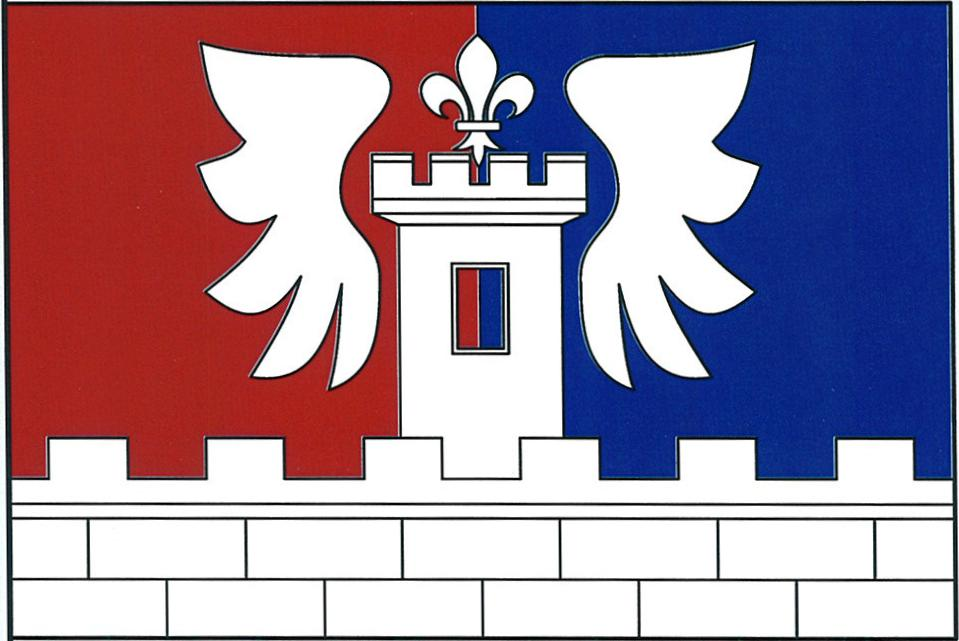
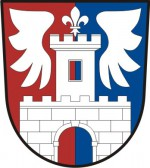
- Flag Coat of arms

- Location in the Czech Republic
- Coordinates: 49°7′23″N 15°32′20″E
- Country: Czech Republic
- Region: South Bohemian
- District: Jindřichův Hradec
- First mentioned: 1211

Area
  - Total: 6.80 km^{2} (2.63 sq mi)
- Elevation: 525 m (1,722 ft)

Population (2026-01-01)
  - Total: 197
  - Density: 29.0/km^{2} (75.0/sq mi)
- Time zone: UTC+1 (CET)
  - Summer (DST): UTC+2 (CEST)
- Postal code: 380 01
- Website: www.obec-cervenyhradek.cz

Červený Hrádek (German: Rothenburg) is a municipality and village in Jindřichův Hradec District in the South Bohemian Region of the Czech Republic. It has about 200 inhabitants.

Červený Hrádek lies approximately 40 kilometres (25 mi) east of Jindřichův Hradec, 80 km (50 mi) east of České Budějovice, and 134 km (83 mi) south-east of Prague.

== Demographics ==
Historical population
Year	Pop.	±%
1869	398	—
1880	415	+4.3%
1890	424	+2.2%
1900	402	−5.2%
1910	400	−0.5%
1921	419	+4.8%
1930	390	−6.9%
1950	311	−20.3%
1961	335	+7.7%
1970	294	−12.2%
1980	241	−18.0%
1991	220	−8.7%
2001	223	+1.4%
2011	235	+5.4%
2021	208	−11.5%
Source: Censuses
