= Hora Svatého Šebestiána =

- Municipality
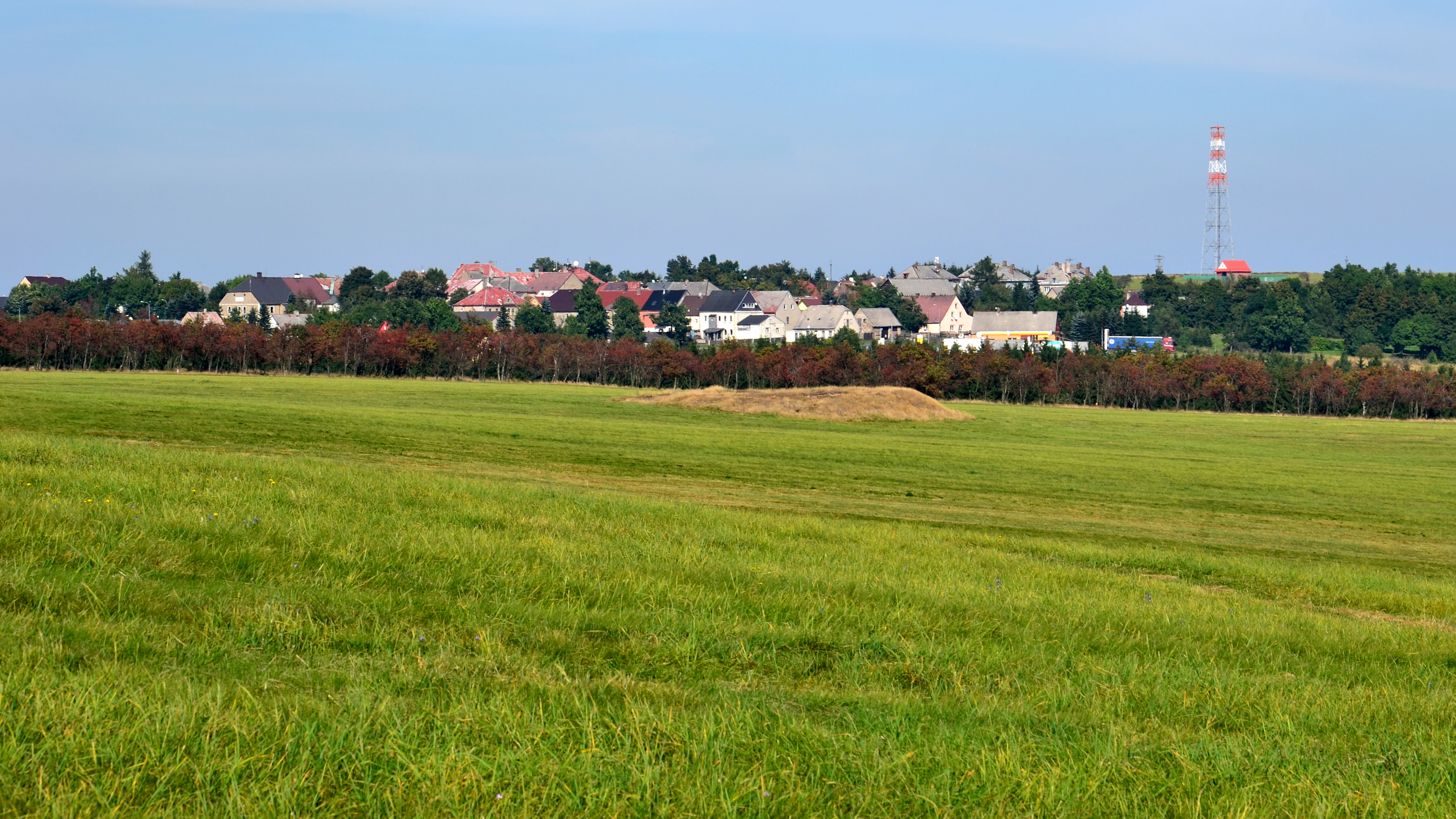
- View from the south

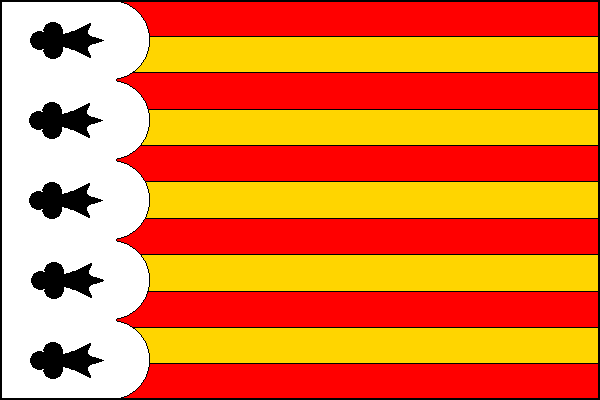
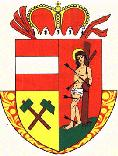
- Flag Coat of arms

- Location in the Czech Republic
- Coordinates: 50°30′37″N 13°15′5″E
- Country: Czech Republic
- Region: Ústí nad Labem
- District: Chomutov
- First mentioned: 1558

Area
  - Total: 34.41 km^{2} (13.29 sq mi)
- Elevation: 843 m (2,766 ft)

Population (2026-01-01)
  - Total: 339
  - Density: 9.85/km^{2} (25.5/sq mi)
- Time zone: UTC+1 (CET)
  - Summer (DST): UTC+2 (CEST)
- Postal codes: 430 01, 431 82
- Website: www.sebestian.cz

Hora Svatého Šebestiána (German: Sankt Sebastiansberg) is a municipality and village in Chomutov District in the Ústí nad Labem Region of the Czech Republic. It has about 300 inhabitants.

Hora Svatého Šebestiána lies approximately 14 kilometres (9 mi) north-west of Chomutov, 59 km (37 mi) west of Ústí nad Labem, and 98 km (61 mi) north-west of Prague.

== Administrative division ==
Hora Svatého Šebestiána consists of two municipal parts (in brackets population according to the 2021 census):

- Hora Svatého Šebestiána (196)
- Nová Ves (113)

== History ==
The first written mention of Hora Svatého Šebestiána is from 1558.

== Demographics ==
Historical population
Year	Pop.	±%
1869	3,235	—
1880	3,671	+13.5%
1890	3,779	+2.9%
1900	3,585	−5.1%
1910	3,437	−4.1%
1921	2,936	−14.6%
1930	3,092	+5.3%
1950	543	−82.4%
1961	524	−3.5%
1970	486	−7.3%
1980	368	−24.3%
1991	180	−51.1%
2001	219	+21.7%
2011	266	+21.5%
2021	309	+16.2%
Source: Censuses
