= Chomutov =

- Statutory city
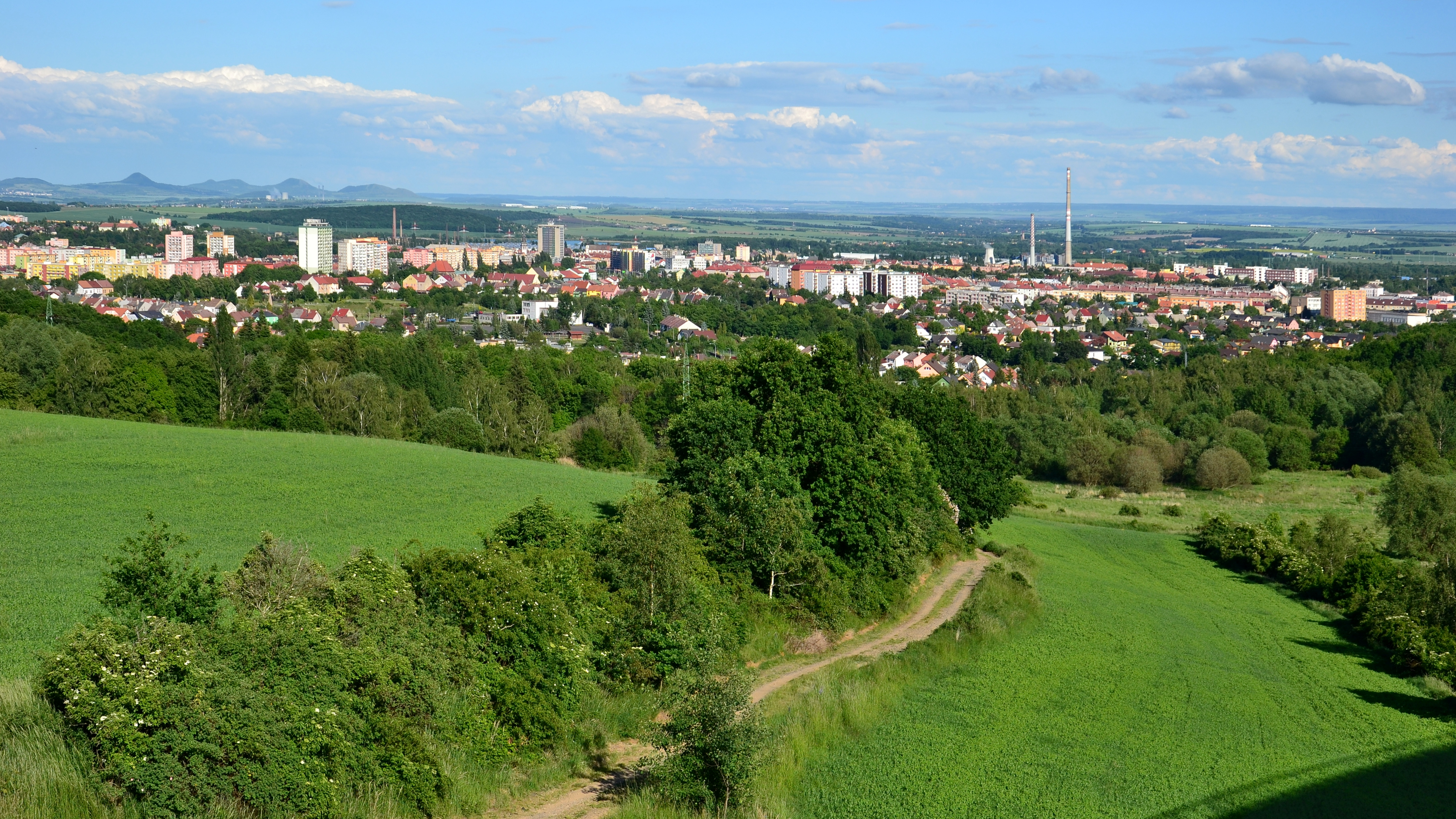
- General view from the northwest

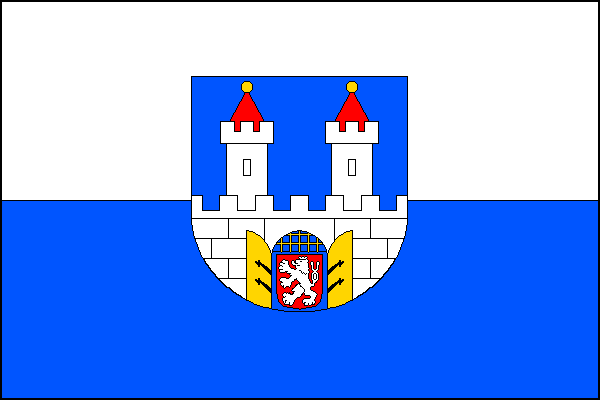
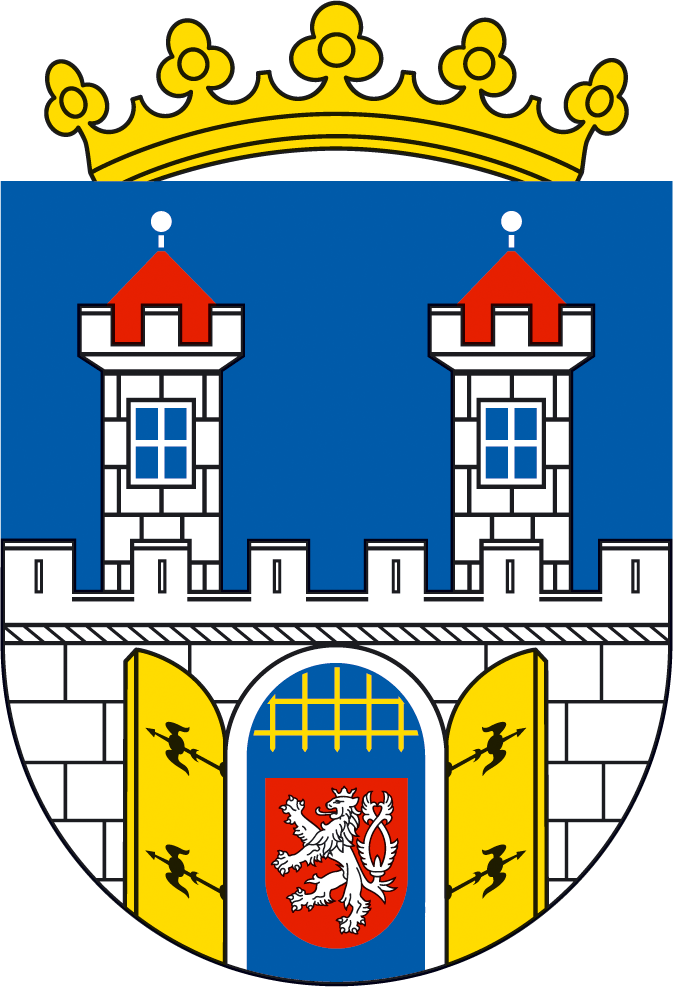
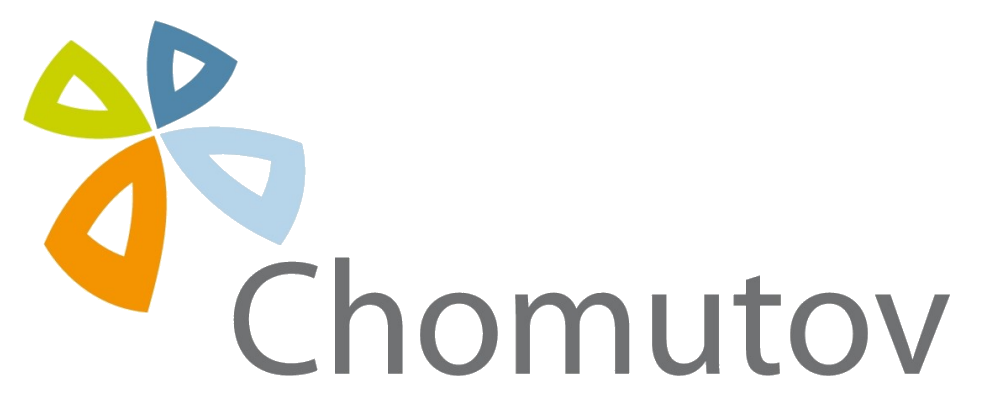
- Flag Coat of arms Wordmark

- Location in the Czech Republic
- Coordinates: 50°27′40″N 13°25′0″E
- Country: Czech Republic
- Region: Ústí nad Labem
- District: Chomutov
- First mentioned: 1252

Government
  - Mayor: Radek Vyšín (ANO 2011)

Area
  - Total: 29.25 km^{2} (11.29 sq mi)
- Elevation: 340 m (1,120 ft)

Population (2026-01-01)
  - Total: 46,560
  - Density: 1,592/km^{2} (4,123/sq mi)
- Time zone: UTC+1 (CET)
  - Summer (DST): UTC+2 (CEST)
- Postal codes: 430 01, 430 03, 430 04
- Website: www.chomutov.cz

Chomutov (Czech pronunciation: [ˈxomutof]; German: Komotau) is a city in the Ústí nad Labem Region of the Czech Republic. It has about 47,000 inhabitants, but there are almost 80,000 inhabitants in the city's wider metropolitan area. The city is located on the Chomutovka River.

The history of Chomutov is connected with the Jesuits, who acted here from 1589 to 1773. However, the main development of the city occurred only in the 19th century thanks to industrialisation and lignite mining. The historic city centre is well preserved and is protected as an urban monument zone. Popular tourist destinations include Zoopark Chomutov, which is the largest zoo in the Czech Republic by area.

== Administrative division ==
Chomutov consists of only one municipal part and is the only such Czech statutory city.

== Etymology ==
The name is derived from the personal name Chomút/Chomout, meaning "Chomout's (court)". The word chomút, from which the personal name arose, denoted a clumsy person in Old Czech.

== Geography ==
Chomutov is located about 78 kilometres (48 mi) northwest of Prague. It lies on the Chomutovka River in the Ore Mountains Foothills. The surface is mostly flat with some hills in the north and southeast of the city. The highest point of the municipal territory is Hůrka 581 m (1,906 ft), a hill on the northwestern municipal border.

There are several bodies of water on the outskirts of the city. Lake Kamencové jezero and the fishpond Velký Otvický rybník are used for recreational purposes.

== History ==
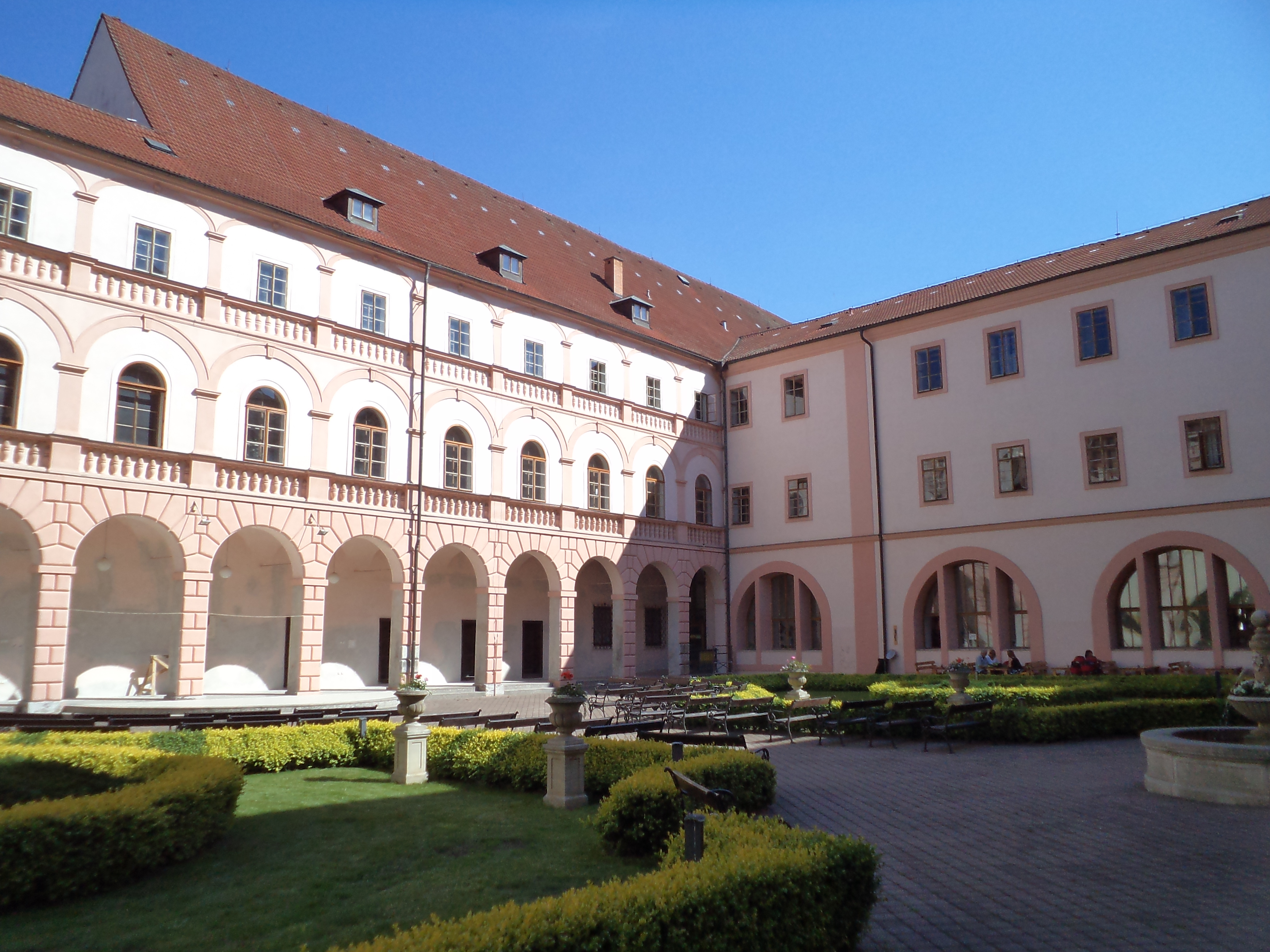
Jesuit college, now the city museum

The first written mention of Chomutov is a donation deed from 1252, when it came into the possession of the Teutonic Order. The Gothic church of St. Catherine built during that era still stands to this day. In 1396, Chomutov received a town charter, and in 1416 the knights sold both the town and the lordship to King Wenceslaus IV.

On 16 March 1421, the town was stormed, sacked and burned by the Taborites. After several upheavals and changes of ownership, Chomutov was taken by Popel of Lobkowicz in 1588, who established Jesuit rule in 1589, leading to trouble between the Protestant citizens and the town's new overlord. In 1594, the feudal lordship fell to the crown, and in 1605 the town purchased its freedom and was made a royal city. After the Thirty Years' War, Chomutov stagnated. The Jesuit Order in the city was abolished in 1773. Rapid development did not come until the second half of the 19th century, with advances in the mining and heavy industries.

By 1938, Chomutov had over 30,000 inhabitants. It had a population comprising about 95% ethnic Germans. A very small Jewish population (444 in 1930 – 1.3% of the total population) came under increasing pressure, and Chomutov was declared "Judenrein" on 23 September 1938 by the increasingly pro-Nazi administration. A week later, Chomutov and its surrounding districts were annexed by Nazi Germany as a result of the 1938 Munich Agreement and administered as part of the Reichsgau Sudetenland.

After 1945, the previous population, German by a large majority, was expelled. Industrial facilities and large high-rise housing projects were then built to redevelop the area. In the late 1970s an urban settlement was built, linking Chomutov with its neighbouring Jirkov. Following the Velvet Revolution of 1989, the heavy industry significantly decreased its activity, but the environment in and around the town has been improved. The leisure facilities of the area were emphasised, notably Kamencové jezero Lake and Zoopark Chomutov.

Since 1 July 2006, Chomutov has been a statutory city.

== Demographics ==
Historical population

Year	Pop.	±%
1869	8,183	—
1880	11,707	+43.1%
1890	15,280	+30.5%
1900	19,813	+29.7%
1910	24,869	+25.5%

Year	Pop.	±%
1921	28,010	+12.6%
1930	33,279	+18.8%
1950	28,848	−13.3%
1961	33,070	+14.6%
1970	40,051	+21.1%

Year	Pop.	±%
1980	51,769	+29.3%
1991	53,107	+2.6%
2001	51,007	−4.0%
2011	48,328	−5.3%
2021	45,549	−5.8%

Source: Censuses

== Economy ==
The largest employer with headquarters in Chomutov is Severočeské doly, a lignite mining company with more than 2,000 employees. Other large industrial companies based in the city include Parker Hannifin Industrial, a manufacturer of hydraulic and pneumatic systems, and Alleima CZ, a manufacturer of products from stainless steel and other metals.

== Transport ==
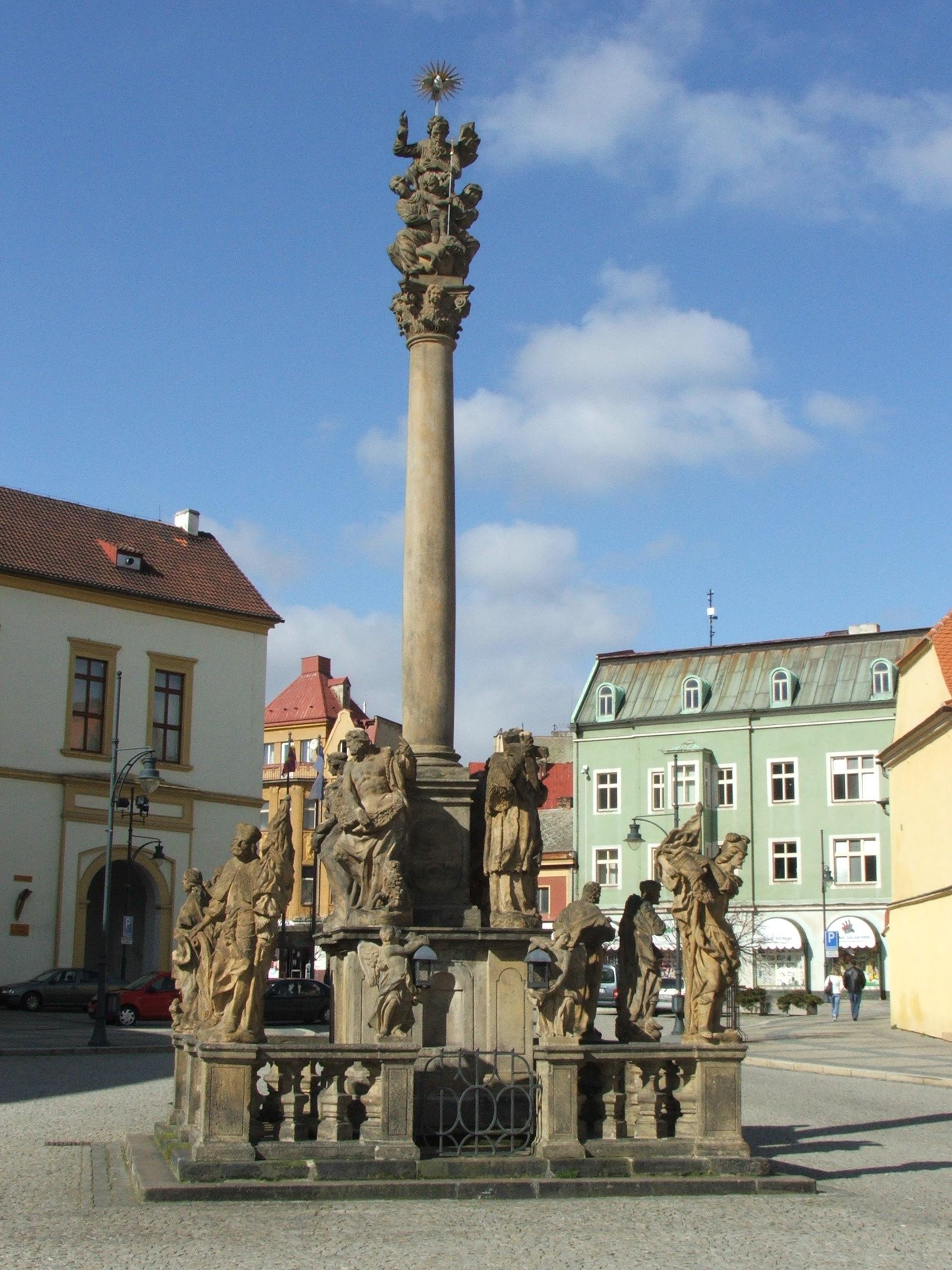
Column of the Holy Trinity

The D7 motorway from Prague to the Czech–German border in Hora Svatého Šebestiána runs through the western part of Chomutov. In Chomutov it crosses with the I/13 road (part of the European route E442) from Karlovy Vary to Liberec.

Chomutov is located at the crossroads of several important railway lines: Prague–Cheb, Plzeň–Most, Děčín–Kadaň and Rakovník–Jirkov. The city is served by two train stations: Chomutov and Chomutov město.

Transport around Chomutov is operated by buses since 1995 and also by trolleybuses. The trolleybus net connects Chomutov with neighbouring Jirkov. They jointly operate a transport company, called Dopravní podnik měst Chomutova a Jirkova.

== Sport ==
Chomutov is home to the ice hockey club Piráti Chomutov, playing in the second tier, and association football club FC Chomutov, playing in the lower amateur tiers.

The city has two sport areas: Zadní Vinohrady, where the water park, football and athletics stadium are located, and Domovinka in the area of the former motorcycle speedway stadium, with two multifunctional courts for tennis, basketball and volleyball and artificially constructed hills for sledding and bobsledding.

== Sights ==
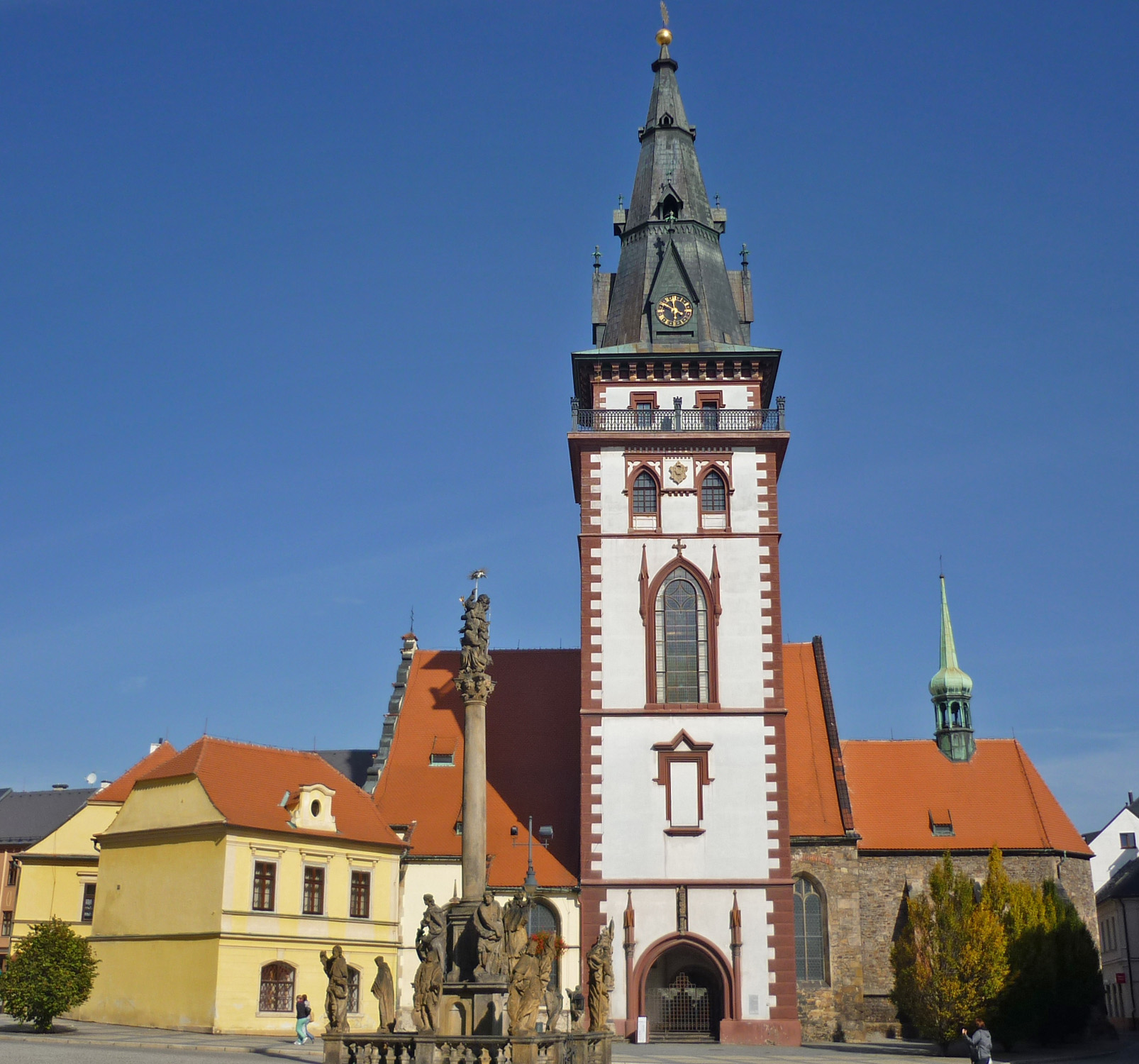
Church of Assumption of the Virgin Mary and the City Tower

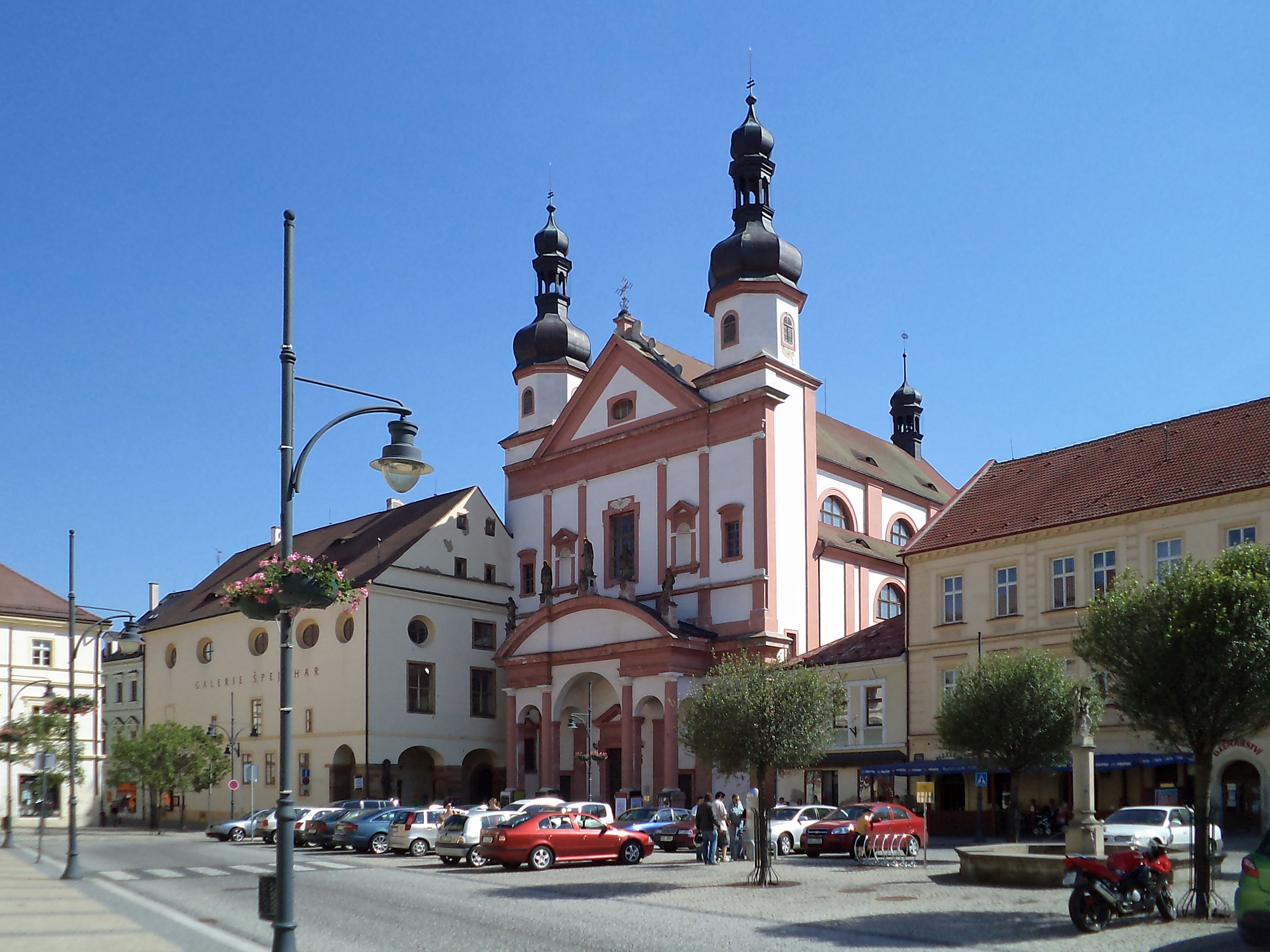
Church of Saint Ignatius

Since 1992, the historical city centre has been protected as an urban monument zone. The historical centre is in the shape of an oblong, and is surrounded by arcades. The square Náměstí 1. máje with the Baroque Column of the Holy Trinity by Ambrož Laurentis from 1697 is banked by seven statues of saints, created between 1725 and 1732.

The city hall is situated in the northwest side and it used to be a commendam until 1607. The city hall is situated next to the Church of Saint Catherine, which was built in the early Gothic style and finished in 1281.

On the opposite side there is the Church of Assumption of the Virgin Mary, built in the late Gothic style between 1518 and 1542. The church is situated next to the 53.7 m (176 ft) tall dominant of the city, the City Tower. The tower was renovated after the fire in 1525 and rebuilt to neo-Gothic style in 1874. Nowadays it is used as a lookout tower.

At the end of the south side is the Church of Saint Ignatius with two towers on the north frontage. The church was built for the Jesuits by Carlo Lurago in the Baroque style in 1663–1668. The building called Špejchar from the 17th century was used by the Jesuits as earlier church and it adjoins the east side of the Church of St. Ignatius. Nowadays it is used as an art gallery. The Jesuit complex also includes the former college, which nowadays houses the city museum.

The Zoopark Chomutov borders with Kamencové jezero lake on its north side. The zoo is focused mostly on breeding European and mainly domestic wild animals (wolf, european bison, etc.). The zoo is the largest in the country by area, with an area of 112 hectares (280 acres).

Bezručovo údolí is a deep, 13 km (8 mi) long woody valley of the Chomutovka River, beginning in the northern part of the territory of Chomutov. It is a popular place for trips.

== Notable people ==
- Matthäus Aurogallus (1490–1543), scholar
- Franz Josef Gerstner (1756–1832), mathematician
- Ernst Fischer (1899–1972), Austrian politician and writer
- Hans Goldmann (1899–1991), Austrian-Swiss ophthalmologist and inventor
- Erich Heller (1911–1990), British philosopher and literary scholar
- Marian Korn (1914–1987), Czech-American printmaker
- Ruth Maria Kubitschek (1931–2024), German actress
- Uschi Nerke (born 1944), German TV host
- Petr Klíma (1964–2023), ice hockey player
- Pavla Hamáčková-Rybová (born 1978), pole vaulter
- Simona Kubová (born 1991), swimmer

== Twin towns – sister cities ==
Chomutov is twinned with:

- Annaberg-Buchholz, Germany
- Bernburg, Germany
- Trnava, Slovakia

== Gallery ==
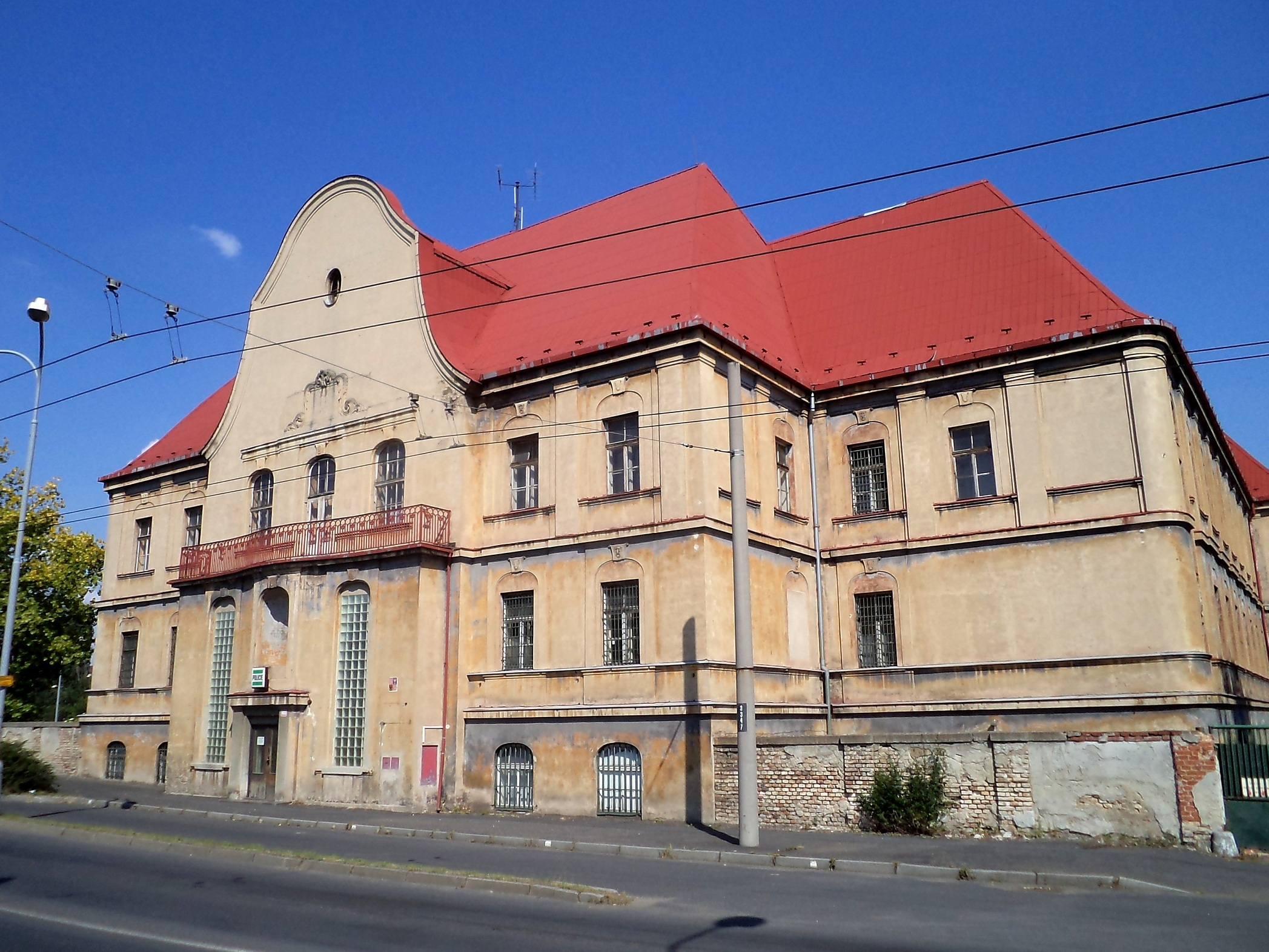
Old poorhouse building

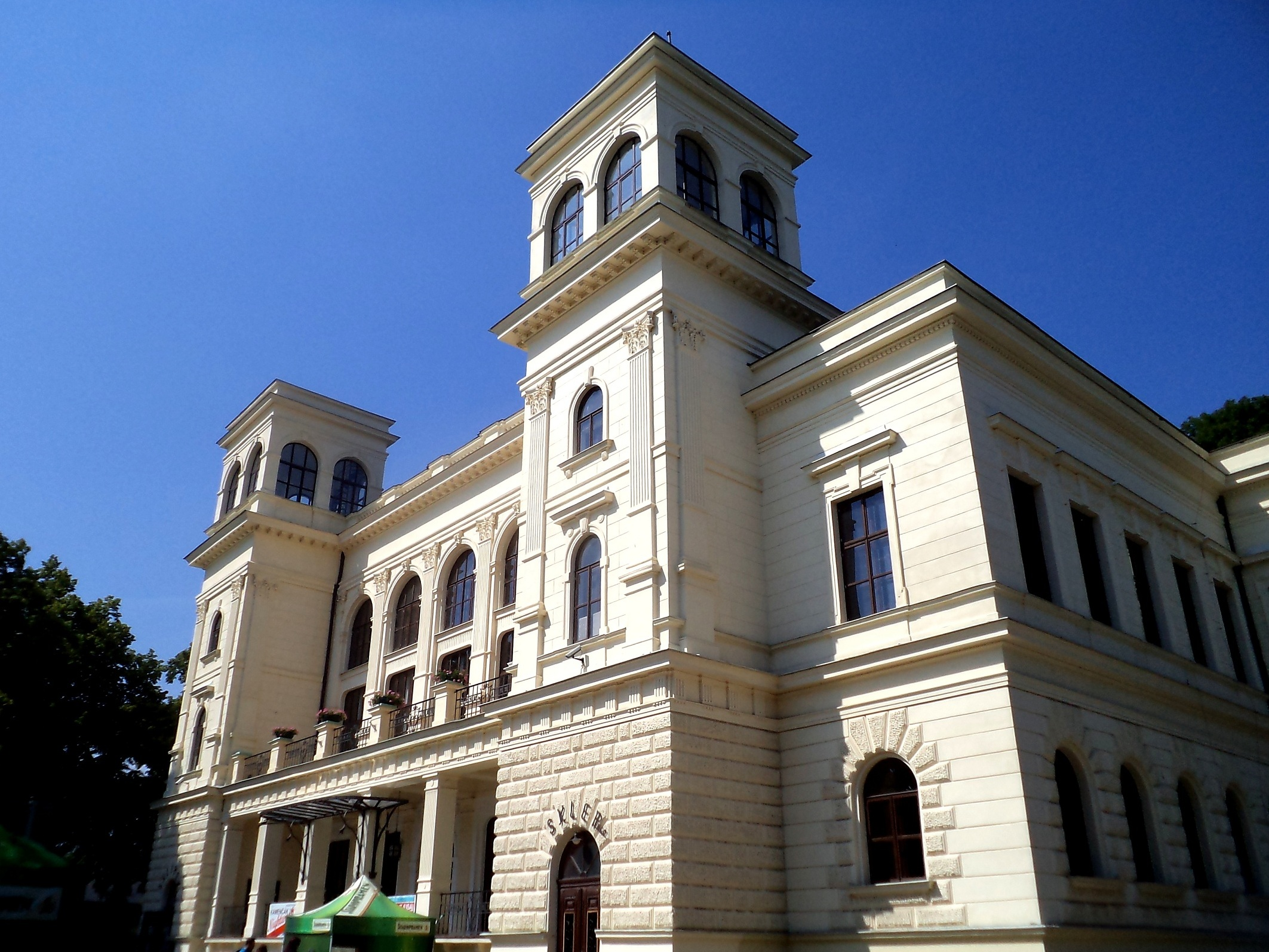
City theatre

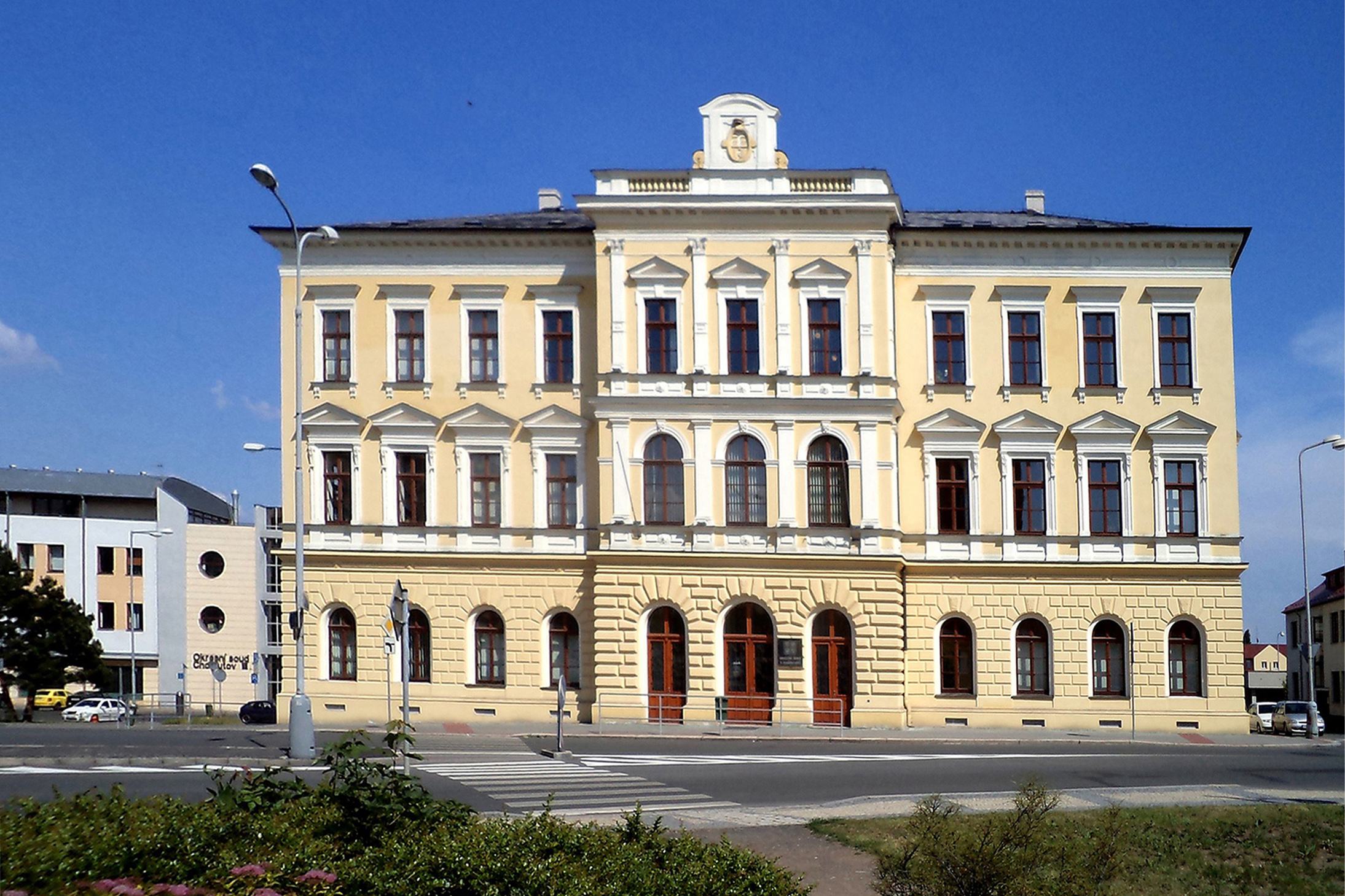
District court building

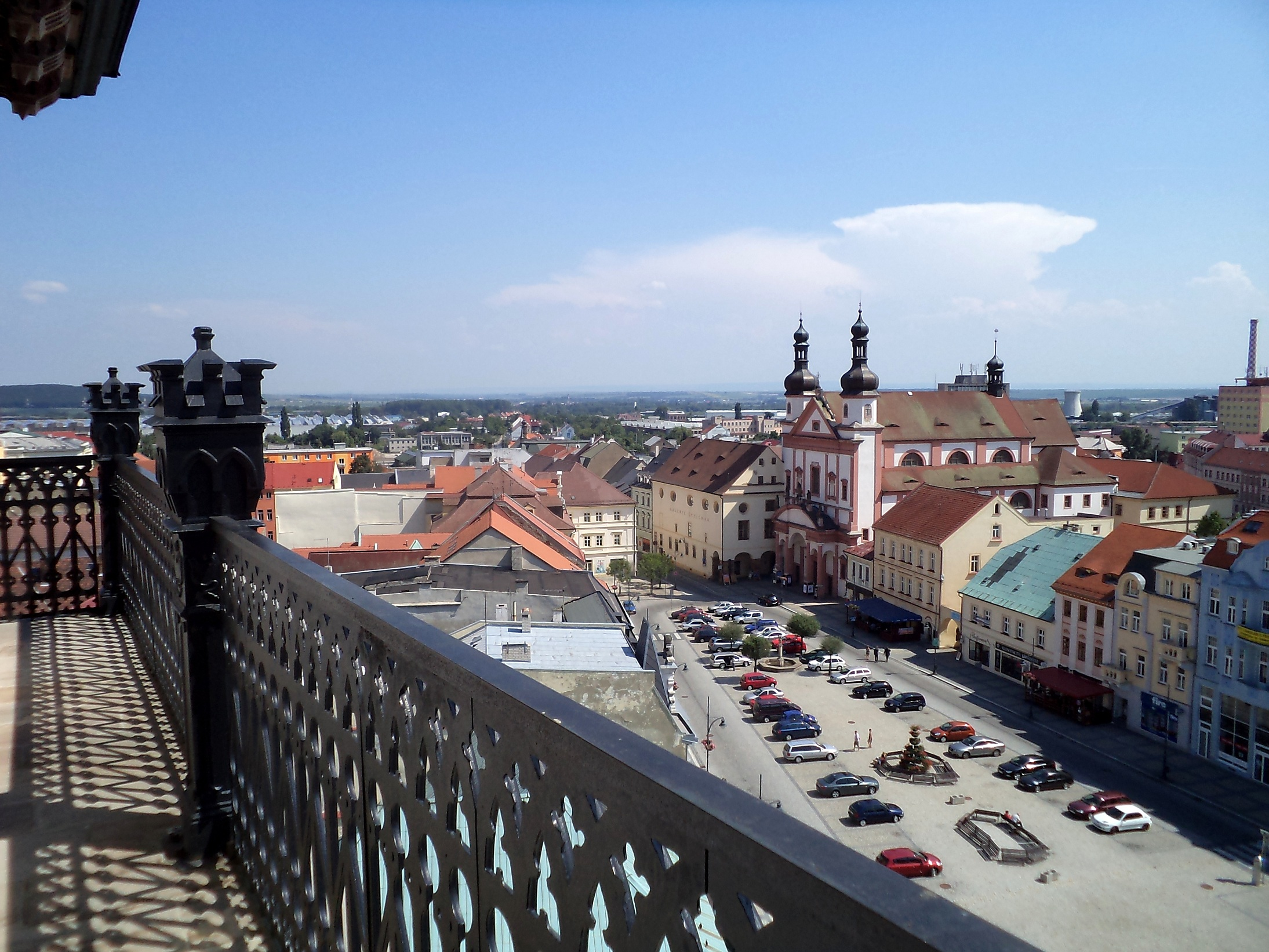
View of the square Náměstí 1. máje

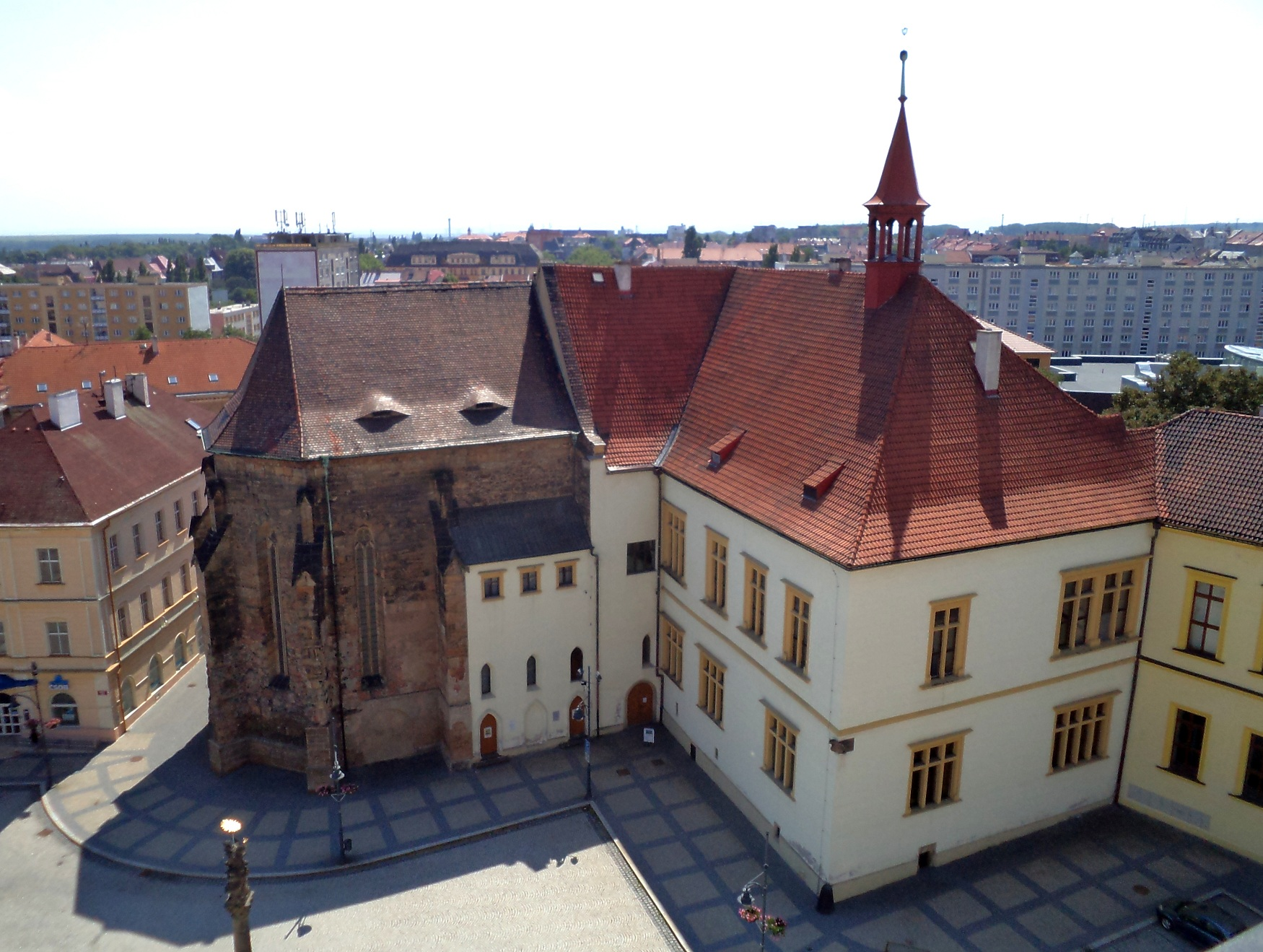
City hall and the Church of St. Catherine
