= List of German names for places in the Czech Republic =

German speaking regions in Austria before 1918

The names of places in what is today the Czech Republic have evolved during their history. The list concerns primarily the settlements, but bilingual names for significant mountains and rivers are also listed. Places are sorted alphabetically according to their German names.

Many of the German names are now exonyms, but used to be endonyms commonly used by the local German population, who had lived in many of these places until shortly after World War II.

Until 1866, the only official language of the Austrian Empire administration was German. Some place names were merely Germanized versions of the original Czech names, as seen e.g. from their etymology. The compromise of 1867 marked a recognition of the need for bilingualism in areas where an important portion of the population used another language; the procedure was imposed by official instructions in 1871.

== Explanatory notes ==
For each settlement, it is stated in which municipality it is located according to the current division. The following abbreviations are used:

- * – extinct (indicating that the settlement no longer exists)
- MTA – military training area (belonging to one of the four military areas in the country, which are the only areas not incorporated to any municipality)
- p. of – administrative part of the municipality that follows

== A ==
- Aag: Doubí, p. of Třebeň
- Abaschin: Závišín, p. of Zádub-Závišín
- Abdank: Adámky, now Loučovice*
- Abertham: Abertamy
- Abtsroth: Opatov, p. of Luby (Cheb District)
- Abtsdorf bei Zwittau: Opatov
- Adamsfreiheit: Hůrky, p. of Nová Bystřice
- Adamstadt: Adamov (České Budějovice District)
- Adamsthal:
  - Adamov (Blansko District)
  - Adamov, p. of Trutnov
  - Adamov, now Karlovice (Bruntál District)*
- Adelsdorf: Adolfovice, p. of Bělá pod Pradědem
- Adersbach: Adršpach
- Adlerdörfel: Orličky
- Adlerhütte: Samoty, now Horní Vltavice*
- Adlerkosteletz: Kostelec nad Orlicí
- Admannsdorf: Adamov (Kutná Hora District)
- Adolfsgrün: Adolfov, now Telnice (Ústí nad Labem District)
- Ahornhütte: Javory
- Ahornsäge: Javoří Pila, now Modrava*
- Ahlkirschen: Bílá Třemešná
- Ahrendorf: Pavlov, now Klášterec nad Ohří*
- Aich: Doubí, p. of Karlovy Vary
- Aichen: Horní Sukolom, p. of Uničov
- Ainsersdorf: Jednov, p. of Suchdol (Prostějov District)
- Albendorf: Bělá u Jevíčka
- Alberitz:
  - Albeřice, p. of Verušičky
  - Malměřice, p. of Blatno (Louny District)
- Albern: Albeř, p. of Nová Bystřice
- Albernhof: Alberov, now Královské Poříčí*
- Albersdorf:
  - Albrechtice (Karviná District)
  - Písařova Vesce, p. of Lesná (Tachov District)
- Albersdörfer Brand: Milíře
- Albrechtitz:
  - Albrechtice (Ústí nad Orlicí District)
  - Albrechtice, p. of Malešov
- Albrechtsschlag: Albrechtovice, p. of Záblatí (Prachatice District)
- Albrechtsdorf: Albrechtice v Jizerských horách
- Alfredshof: Alfrédov, now Kostelec (Tachov District)
- Algersdorf: Valkeřice
- Allenkowitz: Halenkovice
- Allerheiligen: Vyšehorky, p. of Líšnice (Šumperk District)
- Allusch: Záluží, p. of Přídolí
- Aloisdorf: Alojzov
- Alschowitz: Alšovice, p. of Pěnčín (Jablonec nad Nisou District)
- Altalbenreuth: Mýtina, p. of Lipová (Cheb District)
- Alt Benatek: Benátky nad Jizerou II
- Alt Biela: Stará Bělá, p. of Ostrava
- Alt Bohmen: Stará Bohyně, p. of Malšovice
- Altbrunst: Starý Brunst, now Čachrov*
- Altbunzlau: Stará Boleslav
- Alt Bürgersdorf: Staré Purkartice, p. of Hošťálkovy
- Altdorf: Stará Ves, now Hradiště MTA*
- Alt Ehrenberg: Staré Křečany
- Altenberg: Staré Hory, p. of Jihlava
- Altenbuch: Staré Buky
- Altenburg: Staré Hrady
- Altendorf:
  - Stará Ves (Bruntál District)
  - Stará Ves (Přerov District)
  - Stará Ves, p. of Stará Ves nad Ondřejnicí
  - Stará Ves, p. of Vysoké nad Jizerou
  - Staré Oldřůvky, p. of Budišov nad Budišovkou
- Altengrün: Dolní Nivy
- Altenteich: Starý Rybník, p. of Skalná
- Alt Erbersdorf: Staré Heřminovy
- Altfürstenhütte: Stará Knížecí Huť, p. of Lesná (Tachov District)
- Alt Georgswalde: Starý Jiříkov, p. of Jiříkov
- Alt Grafenwalde: Staré Hraběcí, p. of Velký Šenov
- Alt-Grammatin: Mutěnín
- Althabendorf (Alt-Habendorf): Stráž nad Nisou
- Althammer: Staré Hamry
- Althart: Staré Hobzí
- Alt Harzdorf: Liberec XV-Starý Harcov
- Alt Hrosenkau: Starý Hrozenkov
- Althütten:
  - Stará Huť
  - Stará Huť, now Ktiš*
  - Stará Huť, p. of Nemanice
  - Staré Hutě
  - Staré Hutě, p. of Horní Stropnice
- Alt Hwiezdlitz: Staré Hvězdlice, p. of Hvězdlice
- Altkinsberg: Starý Hrozňatov, now Cheb
- Alt-Kolin: Starý Kolín
- Altleipa: Stará Lípa, p. of Česká Lípa
- Altliebe: Stará Libavá, p. of Norberčany
- Alt Moletein: Starý Maletín, p. of Maletín
- Alt Oderberg: Starý Bohumín, p. of Bohumín
- Alt Ohlisch: Stará Oleška, p. of Huntířov
- Altpaka: Stará Paka
- Alt Parisau: Starý Pařezov, p. of Pařezov
- Alt Paulsdorf: Liberec XII-Staré Pavlovice
- Alt Petrein: Starý Petřín
- Altpocher: Stoupa, now Lesná (Tachov District)*
- Alt Prachatitz: Staré Prachatice, p. of Prachatice
- Alt Prennet: Starý Spálenec, p. of Česká Kubice
- Alt Raunek: Starý Rounek, now Vyskytná nad Jihlavou
- Alt Raußnitz: Rousínovec, p. of Rousínov
- Alt Reisch: Stará Říše
- Alt Rognitz: Starý Rokytník, p. of Trutnov
- Alt Rohlau: Stará Role, p. of Karlovy Vary
- Alt Rothwasser: Stará Červená Voda
- Altsattel:
  - Staré Sedlo, p. of Orlík nad Vltavou
  - Staré Sedlo (Tachov District)
- Altsattl:
  - Staré Sedlo (Sokolov District)
  - Staré Sedlo, p. of Teplá
- Alt Schallersdorf: Starý Šaldorf, now Znojmo*
- Alt Schokau: Starý Šachov
- Alt Sedlowitz: Starý Sedloňov, now Velké Svatoňovice
- Altspitzenberg: Starý Špičák, now Boletice MTA*
- Altstadt:
  - Stará Ves, p. of Bílovec
  - Děčín III-Staré Město
  - Staré Město (Bruntál District)
  - Staré Město (Frýdek-Místek District)
  - Staré Město (Svitavy District)
  - Staré Město, p. of Karviná
  - Staré Město, p. of Náchod
  - Staré Město, p. of Třinec
  - Staré Město pod Landštejnem
- Altstadt bei Ungarisch Hradisch: Staré Město (Uherské Hradiště District)
- Alt Steindorf: Starý Hubenov, now Hubenov
- Alt Tabor: Sezimovo Ústí
- Alt Thein (Altthein): Starý Týn, p. of Úštěk
- Alttitschein (Alt Titschein): Starý Jičín
- Alt Traubendorf (Alt Hrosenkau): Starý Hrozenkov
- Alt Turkowitz: Staré Dobrkovice, p. of Kájov
- Altvatergebirge: Hrubý Jeseník (mountain range)
- Altvater: Praděd (mountain)
- Alt Vogelseifen: Stará Rudná, p. of Rudná pod Pradědem
- Altwasser:
  - Stará Voda (Cheb District)
  - Stará Voda, p. of Světlá Hora
- Alt Wiklantitz: Staré Vyklantice, p. of Vyklantice
- Alt Zechsdorf: Staré Těchanovice
- Alt Zedlisch: Staré Sedliště
- Amalienfeld: Amalín, p. of Slezské Rudoltice
- Amonsgrün: Úbočí, p. of Dolní Žandov
- Amplatz: Oplotec, p. of Horšovský Týn
- Amschelberg: Kosova Hora
- Andersdorf:
  - Ondrášov, p. of Moravský Beroun
  - Ondřejov, p. of Rýmařov
- Andreasberg: Ondřejov, now Boletice MTA*
- Andreasdorf: Ondřejov (Pelhřimov District)
- Angel: Úhlava (river)
- Angern: Bujanov
- Anischau: Úněšov
- Annadorf:
  - Anenská Ves, p. of Krajková
  - Annín, p. of Tovačov
- Annathal: Annín, p. of Dlouhá Ves (Klatovy District)
- Antiegelhof: Antýgl, now Srní
- Antoniendorf: Cihelna, p. of Hlavňovice
- Antonienhöhe: Antonínova Výšina, p. of Vojtanov
- Antonienthal: Antonínův Důl, p. of Jihlava
- Antoniwald: Antonínov, p. of Josefův Důl (Jablonec nad Nisou District)
- Antoschowitz: Antošovice, p. of Ostrava
- Arbesau: Varvažov, p. of Telnice (Ústí nad Labem District)
- Archlebau: Archlebov
- Arletzgrün: Arnoldov, p. of Ostrov (Karlovy Vary District)
- Arnau: Hostinné
- Arnitzgrün (Arnetzgrün): Arnoltov, p. of Březová (Sokolov District)
- Arnsdorf: Arnoltice
  - Arnoltice, p. of Bulovka
  - Arnultovice, p. of Jindřichov (Bruntál District)
  - Arnultovice, p. of Nový Bor
  - Arnultovice, p. of Rudník (Trutnov District)
  - Arnultovice, p. of Velké Chvojno
- Artholz: Artolec, p. of Nová Bystřice
- Asch: Aš
- Aschendorf: Okřešice, p. of Česká Lípa
- Aspendorf: Osikov, p. of Bratrušov
- Atschau: Úhošťany, p. of Kadaň
- Attes: Zátes, now Přídolí*
- Au: Loužek, p. of Cheb
- Aubeln: Úblo, p. of Brumovice (Opava District)
- Aubotschen (Aubotsch): Úboč
- Audechen: Zálužice, p. of Hartmanice (Klatovy District)
- Audishorn: Útěchovice, p. of Hamr na Jezeře
- Aue: Luhy, p. of Horní Benešov
- Auern: Návary, p. of Staré Město pod Landštejnem
- Augezd:
  - Újezd (Olomouc District)
  - Újezd (Zlín District)
  - Újezd, p. of Mohelnice
- Augiesel: Újezd, p. of Trmice
- Auherschitz:
  - Uhřice (Kroměříž District)
  - Uhřice (Hodonín District)
- Auhertschitz: Úherčice
- Auhertz: Úherce (Louny District)
- Aujezd ob der Mies: Újezd nade Mží
- Aujest bei Hochfeld: Újezd (Zlín District)
- Aujestel: Újezdec, p. of Bolešiny
- Aujestetz:
  - Újezdec (Prachatice District)
  - Újezdec (Jindřichův Hradec District)
- Aumonin: Úmonín
- Auperschin: Úpořiny, p. of Bystřany
- Auporsch: Úpoř, p. of Světec
- Auras: Úraz, p. of Nemyšl
- Auretz: Úherce (Louny District)
- Aurim (Groß Aurim): Uhřínov, p. of Liberk
- Aurinowes (Aurschinewes): Prague 22-Uhříněves
- Auscha: Úštěk
- Auschitz: Úžice (Mělník District)
- Auschowitz: Úšovice, p. of Mariánské Lázně
- Auspitz: Hustopeče
- Aussee: Úsov
- Außergefild: Kvilda
- Aussig: Ústí nad Labem
- Austerlitz: Slavkov u Brna
- Autieschau: Útěšov, p. of Bavorov
- Autschin: Ujčín, p. of Kolinec
- Autschowa: Ohučov, p. of Staňkov (Domažlice District)
- Auwal: Úvaly

== B ==
- Babe (Baby): Babí, p. of Náchod
- Babilon: Babylon (Domažlice District)
- Babina I: Babiny I, p. of Malečov
- Babina II: Babiny II, p. of Homole u Panny
- Babtschitz: Babčice, p. of Vodice (Tábor District)
- Bachelsdorf: Děčín XXVI-Bechlejovice
- Backofen an der Iser: Bakov nad Jizerou
- Bad Bielohrad: Lázně Bělohrad
- Bad Johannisbrunn: Jánské Koupele, p. of Staré Těchanovice
- Bad Karlsbrunn: Karlova Studánka
- Bad Königswart: Lázně Kynžvart
- Bad Liebwerda: Lázně Libverda
- Bad Lindewiese: Lipová-lázně
- Bad Neudorf: Konstantinovy Lázně
- Bad Schlag: Jablonecké Paseky, p. of Jablonec nad Nisou
- Bad Sternberg: Lázně Šternberk, now Ledce (Kladno District)
- Bad Wurzelsdorf: Kořenov
- Badstübel: Podštěly, p. of Chyše
- Bäckenhain: Pekařka, p. of Bílý Kostel nad Nisou
- Baislowitz: Zbyslavice
- Bärn: Moravský Beroun
- Barnsdorf: Bernartice nad Odrou
- Bärnsdorf an der Tafelfichte: Horní Řasnice
- Bärnwald: Neratov v Orlických horách, now Bartošovice v Orlických horách
- Bärringen: Pernink
- Bakow an der Iser: Bakov nad Jizerou
- Balklhota: Balkova Lhota
- Banow: Bánov (Uherské Hradiště District)
- Banowitz: Báňovice
- Barau: Bavorov
- Barchowitz: Barchovice
- Barking: Borek, p. of Malšovice
- Bartelsdorf:
  - Bartoňov, p. of Ruda nad Moravou
  - Bartovice, p. of Ostrava
  - Bartultovice, p. of Vysoká (Bruntál District)
  - Dřínov, now Most*
- Barzdorf:
  - Bernartice (Jeseník District)
  - Božanov
  - (am Rollberge): Pertoltice pod Ralskem
- Basberg: Hora Svatého Šebastiána
- Baschka: Baška (Frýdek-Místek District)
- Baschten: Holubovská Bašta, p. of Čakov (České Budějovice District)
- Batschetin: Bačetín
- Battelau: Batelov
- Batzdorf:
  - Bartošovice v Orlických horách
  - Bartultovice, p. of Vysoká (Bruntál District)
- Bauschenhof: Pouchov, p. of Hradec Králové
- Bauschowitz (an der Eger): Bohušovice nad Ohří
- Bausnitz: Bohuslavice, p. of Trutnov
- Bautsch: Budišov nad Budišovkou
- Bayerhof: Bajerov
- Bechin (Beching): Bechyně
- Becwar: Bečváry
- Bedihoscht: Bedihošť
- Bejscht (Beyscht): Býšť
- Benatek: Benátky nad Jizerou
- Beneschau:
  - Benešov
  - Benešovice
  - Dolní Benešov
- Benetschlag: Bláto, now Boletice MTA*
- Benhof: Beňovy, p. of Klatovy
- Benke: Benkov, p. of Dlouhomilov
- Benkowitz: Benkovice, p. of Hradec nad Moravicí
- Bennisch: Horní Benešov
- Bensen: Benešov nad Ploučnicí
- Beraun: Beroun
- Berg:
  - Hora Svatého Václava
  - Horka, p. of Nový Kostel
- Bergau: Bergov, p. of Vlčice (Jeseník District)
- Bergersdorf: Kamenná (Jihlava District)
- Bergesgrün: Chudeřín, p. of Litvínov
- Berggraben: Vrchová, now Bernartice (Trutnov District)
- Berghäuseln: Hůrky, p. of Karlovy Vary
- Bergjanowitz: Vrchotovy Janovice
- Bergles: Bražec
- Bergreichenstein: Kašperské Hory
- Bergstadt: Horní Město
- Bergstadt Platten: Horní Blatná
- Bergstadtl:
  - Hory Matky Boží, p. of Velhartice
  - Ratibořské Hory
- Berlau: Brloh (Český Krumlov District)
- Bernarditz: Bernartice (Písek District)
- Bernau:
  - Bernov, p. of Krajková
  - Bernov, p. of Nejdek
- Berneck: Pernek, p. of Horní Planá
- Bernetzreith: Pernolec, p. of Částkov (Tachov District)
- Bernhau: Barnov, now Libavá MTA*
- Bernklau: Bezvěrov
- Bernschlag:
  - Podlesí, p. of Staré Město pod Landštejnem
  - Nový Vojířov, p. of Nová Bystřice
- Bernsdorf: Bernartice (Trutnov District)
- Berzdorf:
  - Liberec XX-Ostašov
  - Pertoltice (Liberec District)
- Besdiedowitz (Besdietowitz): Bezdědovice
- Besdiekau (Bezdiekau):
  - Bezděkov (Klatovy District)
  - Bezděkov pod Třemšínem
- Beseditz (Besseditz): Besedice, p. of Koberovy
- Besikau: Bezděkov, p. of Toužim
- Beskiden: Beskydy (mountain range)
- Bessenitz: Besednice
- Bestwin: Běstvina
- Bettlern: Žebrák
- Bezdiek:
  - Bezděkov, p. of Žatec
  - Bezděkov u Úsova, p. of Úsov
- Biberswald: Bobrovníky, p. of Hlučín
- Biberteich: Bobrovník, p. of Lipová-lázně
- Biebersdorf: Příbram, p. of Verneřice
- Biechowitz: Prague-Běchovice
- Biechtschin (Biechzin): Běštín
- Biela:
  - Bělá (Havlíčkův Brod District)
  - Bělá (Pelhřimov District)
  - Česká Bělá
  - Děčín X-Bělá
  - Rohovládova Bělá
- Bielau:
  - Bělá (Opava District)
  - Bílov (Nový Jičín District)
- Bielenz: Bílence
- Bieletsch: Běleč (Kladno District)
- Bieloschitz: Bělušice (Most District)
- Bieltsch:
  - Běleč (Brno-Country District)
  - Běleč (Tábor District)
  - Běleč, p. of Těšovice (Prachatice District)
- Bieltscher Öd: Bělečská Lhota, p. of Těšovice (Prachatice District)
- Bieltschitz: Bělčice
- Bienendorf: Včelná
- Bierbruck (Bierbrücke): Můstek, now Záblatí (Prachatice District)*
- Bierloch: Brloh, p. of Louny
- Bieschin (Beschin): Běšiny
- Bieschtin: Běštín
- Bilin: Bílina
- Bilkau: Bílkov, p. of Dačice
- Billowitz (Bilowitz):
  - Bílovice
  - Velké Bílovice
- Binaberg: Vinná, p. of Křemže
- Binowe: Byňov, p. of Homole u Panny
- Binsdorf: Bynovec
- Birgstein: Liberec IV-Perštýn
- Birkau: Březí, p. of Čachrov
- Birkenberg: Březové Hory, p. of Příbram
- Birkenhaid: Březová Lada, p. of Horní Vltavice*
- Birkigt: Děčín XXVII-Březiny
- Birnai: Brná, p. of Ústí nad Labem
- Birnbaumhof: Hruškové Dvory, p. of Jihlava
- Birndorf: Hrušková, p. of Sokolov
- Bischitz: Byšice
- Bischofteinitz: Horšovský Týn
- Bisenz: Bzenec
- Biskupitz: Biskupice (Prostějov District)
- Bisterz: Brno-Bystrc
- Bistrau: Bystré (Svitavy District)
- Bistritz an der Angel: Bystřice nad Úhlavou, p. of Nýrsko
- Bistritz am Hostein: Bystřice pod Hostýnem
- Bistritz bei Beneschau: Bystřice (Benešov District)
- Bistritz ob Pernstein: Bystřice nad Pernštejnem
- Bistrzitz: Bystřice (Frýdek-Místek District)
- Bitouchow: Bítouchov
- Bittau: Bítov (Nový Jičín District)
- Bladensdorf: Mladoňov, p. of Nový Malín
- Blankersdorf: Blankartice, p. of Heřmanov (Děčín District)
- Blanz: Blansko
- Blaschdorf: Lhotka, p. of Bílovec
- Blaschin: Blažim (Plzeň-North District)
- Blaschkau: Blažkov
- Blaschke: Vlaské, p. of Malá Morava
- Blatna: Blatná
- Blatnitz (Blattnitz): Blatnice (Třebíč District)
- Blattendorf: Blahutovice, p. of Jeseník nad Odrou
- Blauda: Bludov (Šumperk District)
- Blauendorf: Bludovice, p. of Nový Jičín
- Blauenschlag: Blažejov
- Bleich: Bělidla, p. of Olomouc
- Bleistadt: Oloví
- Bleiswedel: Blíževedly
- Blisowa: Blížejov
- Blosdorf: Mladějov na Moravě
- Blottendorf: Polevsko
- Blowitz: Blovice
- Bludau: Bludov (Kutná Hora District)
- Blumenau:
  - Květná
  - Květná, now Boletice MTA*
  - Plumlov
- Blumendorf: Květnov, p. of Havlíčkův Brod
- Bobow: Bobov, p. of Malá Skála
- Bobrau: Bobrová
- Bobrownik: Bobrovníky, p. of Hlučín
- Bochdalau: Bohdalov
- Bochdalitz: Bohdalice, p. of Bohdalice-Pavlovice
- Bockhütte: Pokovy Hutě, now Nové Hutě
- Bodenbach: Děčín IV-Podmokly
- Bodenstadt: Potštát
- Bodisch: Bohdašín, p. of Teplice nad Metují
- Bohauschkowitz: Bohouškovice, p. of Křemže
- Böhmdorf:
  - Byňov, p. of Nové Hrady (České Budějovice District)
  - Dolní Brzotice, now Boletice MTA*
- Böhmen: Čechy
- Böhmerwald: Šumava (mountain range)
- Böhmisch Aicha: Český Dub
- Böhmisch Bela: Česká Bělá
- Böhmisch Bernschlag: Nový Vojířov, p. of Nová Bystřice
- Böhmisch Bokau: Český Bukov, now Povrly
- Böhmisch Borau: Beranov, p. of Teplá
- Böhmisch Brod: Český Brod
- Böhmisch Domaschlag: Domaslav, p. of Lestkov (Tachov District)
- Böhmischdorf:
  - Česká Ves
  - Česká Ves, p. of Jablonné v Podještědí
- Böhmisch Einsiedel: Mníšek, p. of Nová Ves v Horách
- Böhmisch Gilowitz: Horní Jílovice, now Rožmberk nad Vltavou
- Böhmisch Grillowitz: České Křídlovice, now Božice
- Böhmisch Haidl: Maňávka, now Horní Planá*
- Böhmisch Hammer:
  - České Hamry, p. of Strážov (Klatovy District)
  - České Hamry, p. of Vejprty
- Böhmischhäuser: České Chalupy, p. of Nová Ves (Český Krumlov District)
- Böhmisch Hörschlag: Český Heršlák, p. of Horní Dvořiště
- Böhmisch Kahn: Velké Chvojno
- Böhmisch Kamnitz: Česká Kamenice
- Böhmisch Killmes: Český Chloumek, p. of Útvina
- Böhmisch Kopist: České Kopisty, p. of Terezín
- Böhmisch Krumau: Český Krumlov
- Böhmisch Kubitzen: Česká Kubice
- Böhmisch Leipa: Česká Lípa
- Böhmisch Lichwe: České Libchavy
- Böhmisch Liebau: Dolní Libina, p. of Libina
- Bömisch Lotschnau: Český Lačnov, p. of Opatovec
- Böhmisch Märzdorf: Bohdíkov
- Böhmisch Matha: Dědová
- Böhmisch Meseritsch: České Meziříčí
- Böhmisch Müglitz: Mohelnice, now Krupka*
- Böhmisch Neudörfel: Český Újezd, p. of Chlumec (Ústí nad Labem District)
- Böhmisch Neustadtl: Dolní Bělá
- Böhmisch Pokau: Český Bukov, now Povrly
- Böhmisch Röhren: České Žleby, p. of Stožec
- Böhmisch Rudoletz: Český Rudolec
- Böhmisch Rust: Kadaňský Rohozec, p. of Radonice (Chomutov District)
- Böhmisch Rybna: Česká Rybná
- Böhmisch Skalitz: Česká Skalice
- Böhmisch Sternberg: Český Šternberk
- Böhmisch Trübau: Česká Třebová
- Böhmisch Ullersdorf: Oldřichov na Hranicích, p. of Hrádek nad Nisou
- Böhmisch Weigsdorf: Višňová (Liberec District)
- Böhmisch Wiesen: Česká Dlouhá, now Březová nad Svitavou
- Böhmisch Wiesenthal: Loučná pod Klínovcem
- Böhmisch Zlatnik (Böhmisch Schladnig): České Zlatníky, p. of Obrnice
- Bohutschowitz: Bohučovice, p. of Hradec nad Moravicí
- Boidensdorf: Bohdanovice, p. of Jakartovice
- Boksgrün: Srní, p. of Stráž nad Ohří
- Bölten: Bělotín
- Bogumin: Bohumín
- Bohaunowitz (Bohounowitz):
  - Bohouňovice I, p. of Červené Pečky
  - Bohouňovice II, p. of Horní Kruty
- Bohdalowitz: Bohdalovice, p. of Velké Hamry
- Bohdanetsch:
  - Bohdaneč
  - Lázně Bohdaneč
- Bohentsch: Vahaneč, p. of Verušičky
- Bohnau: Banín
- Bohuslawitz:
  - Bohuslavice (Náchod District)
  - Bohuslavice (Šumperk District)
  - Bohuslavice u Zlína
- Bohutin: Bohutín (Šumperk District)
- Bojkowitz (Boikowitz): Bojkovice
- Bolatitz: Bolatice
- Bolehoscht: Bolehošť
- Bolehradice: Boleradice
- Boniowitz: Bohuňovice (Olomouc District)
- Boor: Bor, p. of Velešín
- Bordowitz: Bordovice
- Boreschnitz: Borečnice, p. of Čížová
- Boreslau: Bořislav
- Boritz: Bořice (Chrudim District)
- Borken: Borek, p. of Dačice
- Borotin:
  - Borotín (Blansko District)
  - Borotín (Tábor District)
- Borotitz: Borotice (Příbram District)
- Borowa: Borová (Svitavy District)
- Borowitz: Borovnice (Rychnov nad Kněžnou District)
- Borownitz: Borovnice (Žďár nad Sázavou District)
- Borry: Bory (Žďár nad Sázavou District)
- Borschanowitz: Bořanovice, p. of Vimperk
- Borschau: Boršov
- Borschim: Bořejov, p. of Ždírec (Česká Lípa District)
- Bösching: Bezděčín, p. of Frýdštejn
- Boschowitz: Bošovice
- Bosenitz: Tvarožná (Brno-Country District)
- Bosin: Boseň
- Boskowitz: Boskovice
- Boskuwek: Moravské Prusy, p. of Prusy-Boškůvky
- Bosowitz: Pozovice, p. of Štoky
- Botenwald: Butovice, p. of Studénka
- Bowitz: Babice (Prachatice District)
- Bozegow (Boschejow): Božejov
- Bradlenz: Bradlo, p. of Velký Beranov
- Brand
  - (Brand I): Milíře
  - Milíře, p. of Rozvadov
  - Paseka, now Deštné v Orlických horách
  - (Brand II): Žďár, p. of Chodský Újezd
  - Žďár, p. of Tanvald
- Brand an der Adler: Žďár nad Orlicí
- Brand an der Mettau: Žďár nad Metují
- Brandau: Brandov
- Brandeis an der Adler: Brandýs nad Orlicí
- Brandeis an der Elbe: Brandýs nad Labem
- Brandeisl (Brandeisek): Brandýsek
- Brandschau: Branišov
- Brandzeif: Ždárský Potok, p. of Stará Ves (Bruntál District)
- Branek: Branky
- Branik: Prague-Braník
- Branischau: Branišov, p. of Toužim
- Branitschau (Branitschkow): Braníčkov, p. of Velhartice
- Brankowitz: Brankovice
- Branowitz: Vranovice (Brno-Country District)
- Branschau:
  - Branišov, p. of Kdyně
  - Branišov, p. of Zdíkov
- Bransdorf: Brantice
- Brany (Bran): Braňany
- Bratelsbrunn: Březí (Břeclav District)
- Bratschikow (Bratrikow): Bratříkov, p. of Pěnčín (Jablonec nad Nisou District)
- Bratschitz bei Tschaslau: Bratčice (Kutná Hora District)
- Brättersdorf: Bratříkovice
- Brattersdorf: Bratrušov
- Braunau: Broumov
- Braunöhlhütten: Vranová Lhota
- Braunbusch (Braunpusch): Prapořiště, p. of Kdyně
- Braunsberg: Brušperk
- Braunsdorf: Brumovice (Opava District)
- Braunseifen: Ryžoviště
- Brawin: Bravinné, p. of Bílovec
- Breitenau: Široká Niva
- Breitenbach: Potůčky
- Breitenfurt: Široký Brod, p. of Mikulovice (Jeseník District)
- Brenn: Brenná, p. of Zákupy
- Brenndorf: Spálená, p. of Nový Kostel
- Brennei (Brana): Horní Branná
- Brennporitschen: Spálené Poříčí
- Brenntenberg: Spálenec, p. of Zbytiny
- Bresetz: Březce, p. of Štěpánov
- Bresnitz: Březnice (Příbram District)
- Brettern: Desky, p. of Malonty
- Bretterschlag:
  - Ostrov u Macochy
  - Petřejov, now Vyšší Brod*
- Brettmühl: Pila, now Potůčky*
- Brezno: Březno (Mladá Boleslav District)
- Bries (Brezy):
  - Březí (Prague-East District)
  - Březí, p. of Dražíč
- Briesau: Březová (Opava District)
- Briesen: Břežánky, now Bílina*
- Brims: Brniště
- Brockersdorf: Čabová, p. of Moravský Beroun
- Brod: Vráto
- Brodek: Brodek u Konice
- Broden: Bradné, p. of Čachrov
- Brodetz: Brodce
- Brösau: Březová (Sokolov District)
- Brosdorf: Bravantice
- Brozan (Brosan):
  - Brozany, p. of Staré Hradiště
  - Brozany nad Ohří
- Bruch: Lom (Most District)
- Bruck am Hammer: Brod nad Tichou
- Bruneswerde: Stará Ves nad Ondřejnicí
- Brünn: Brno
- Brünnersteig: Brlenka, now Čistá (Svitavy District)
- Brünnl: Dobrá Voda, p. of Horní Stropnice
- Brünnles (Brünles): Brníčko
- Brünnlitz: Brněnec
- Brüsau: Březová nad Svitavou
- Brüx: Most
- Brumow: Brumov
- Brunn:
  - Studenec, p. of Nicov
  - Studnice, p. of Lodhéřov
- Brunnersdorf: Prunéřov, p. of Kadaň
- Brzeznik: Březník
- Brzezolup: Březolupy
- Brzuchotein: Břuchotín, p. of Křelov-Břuchotín
- Brzas (Bschas): Břasy
- Bubentsch (Bubenc): Prague-Bubeneč
- Bubna: Bubny, now Prague-Holešovice
- Bucharten: Stará Pohůrka, p. of Srubec
- Buchau: Bochov
- Buchberg: Bukovec
- Buchbergsthal: Železná, p. of Vrbno pod Pradědem
- Buchelsdorf
  - Bukovice, p. of Jeseník
  - Bukovice, p. of Velké Losiny
- Buchen:
  - Buk (Prachatice District)
  - Buk (Přerov District)
- Buchers: Pohoří na Šumavě, p. of Pohorská Ves
- Buchholz: Pohorsko, p. of Nezdice na Šumavě
- Buchlowitz: Buchlovice
- Buchsdorf: Buková, p. of Bernartice (Jeseník District)
- Buchwald: Bučina, p. of Kvilda
- Buchwaldsdorf: Bučnice, now Teplice nad Metují
- Buda: Budov, p. of Verušičky
- Budaschitz: Bohdašice, p. of Dlouhá Ves (Klatovy District)
- Budigsdorf: Krasíkov
- Budin (an der Eger): Budyně nad Ohří
- Budischau: Budišov
- Budischkowitz: Budíškovice
- Budischowitz: Budišovice
- Budkau: Budkov (Třebíč District)
- Budnian: Budňany, now Karlštejn (Beroun District)
- Budweis (Böhmisch-Budweis): České Budějovice
- Budwitz: Moravské Budějovice
- Buggaus: Bukovsko, p. of Malonty
- Bühlöding (Büleding): Bíletín, p. of Tachov
- Bukau:
  - (Bukow, Buck): Bukov (Žďár nad Sázavou District)
  - Bukov, p. of Třešť
- Bünauburg: Děčín IX-Bynov
- Bürgleins am Wlarapass: Hrádek na Vlárské dráze, p. of Slavičín
- Bürgles: Hrádek (Hradec Králové District)
- Bürgstein: Sloup v Čechách
- Bukawitz: Bukovice (Náchod District)
- Bukowitz:
  - Bukovice (Brno-Country District)
  - Bukovice, p. of Bžany (Teplice District)
  - Bukovice, p. of Písařov
- Bukowka: Bukovka
- Bukwa (Buckwa): Bukovany (Sokolov District)
- Bullendorf: Bulovka
- Bunzendorf: Boleslav, p. of Černousy
- Burgstadtl: Hradec, p. of Rokle
- Burgstall: Hradiště, p. of Nová Bystřice
- Burgwiese: Burkvíz, p. of Město Albrechtice
- Burkersdorf: Střítež, p. of Trutnov
- Busau: Bouzov
- Buschin: Bušín
- Buschtiehrad: Buštěhrad
- Buschullersdorf: Oldřichov v Hájích
- Busk: Boubská, p. of Vimperk
- Buslawitz: Bohuslavice (Opava District)
- Butsch: Budeč (Jindřichův Hradec District)
- Butschafka: Bučávka, p. of Liptaň
- Butschin: Velká Bučina, p. of Velvary
- Butschina: Bučina (Ústí nad Orlicí District)
- Butschowitz: Bučovice
- Butzkow: Buštěhrad
- Bystrey: Bystré (Rychnov nad Kněžnou District)
- Bzi: Bzí, p. of Dolní Bukovsko

== C ==
- Cachrau (Czachrau): Čachrov
- Cakowitz: Prague-Čakovice
- Caslau (Caßlau): Čáslav
- Castolowitz: Častolovice
- Cechtitz (Czechtitz): Čechtice
- Celakowitz: Čelákovice
- Cellechowitz: Čelechovice
- Cerekwitz:
  - Cerekvice nad Bystřicí
  - Cerekvice nad Loučnou
- Cerhenitz: Cerhenice
- Cerhof: Crhov, p. of Štíty
- Cernahora (Czernahora): Černá Hora (Blansko District)
- Cernositz: Černošice
- Cernowitz: Černovice (Blansko District)
- Cestin: Čestín
- Cestitz: Čestice (Strakonice District)
- Chabitschau: Chabičov, p. of Háj ve Slezsku
- Chanowitz: Chanovice
- Charlottendorf: Karlín, now Gruna
- Charlottenfeld: Karlín (Hodonín District)
- Charwath: Charváty
- Chawwytetz: Charvatce
- Chaustnik: Choustník
- Cheynow: Chýnov
- Chiesch: Chyše
- Chinitz-Tettau: Vchynice-Tetov, p. of Srní
- Chirles: Krchleby (Šumperk District)
- Chlistow: Chlístov, p. of Železný Brod
- Chliwitz: Chlívce, p. of Stárkov
- Chlodow: Chloudov, p. of Koberovy
- Chlumcan (Klumtschan): Chlumčany (Plzeň-South District)
- Chlumetschek: Chlumeček, p. of Křemže
- Chlumetz:
  - Chlum u Třeboně
  - (an der Cidlina): Chlumec nad Cidlinou
  - Vysoký Chlumec
- Chlumtschan (Klumtschan): Chlumčany (Louny District)
- Chlunz: Chlumec, p. of Dačice
- Chmelna:
  - Chmelná
  - Chmelná, p. of Křemže
- Chodau: Chodov (Sokolov District)
- Chodenschloß: Trhanov
- Chodolitz: Chodovlice
- Choltitz: Choltice
- Chorin: Choryně
- Chotieborsch (Chotebor, Choteborz): Chotěboř
- Chotieschau:
  - Chotěšov (Litoměřice District)
  - Chotěšov (Plzeň-South District)
- Chotimiersch: Chotiměř, p. of Blížejov
- Chotowin: Chotoviny
- Chotsche: Chodeč, p. of Velešín
- Chotusitz: Chotusice
- Chotzen: Choceň
- Chräntschowitz: Chrančovice, p. of Všeruby (Plzeň-North District)
- Chrast: Chrast
- Chraschtian: Chrášťany (České Budějovice District)
- Chrisdorf: Křišťanovice
- Chrises: Křižanov, p. of Hynčina
- Christelschlag: Křišťanovice, p. of Záblatí (Prachatice District)
- Christianberg: Křišťanov
- Christianstadt: Liberec V-Kristiánov
- Christiansthal: Kristiánov, now Bedřichov (Jablonec nad Nisou District)
- Christofsgrund: Kryštofovo Údolí
- Christophhammer: Kryštofovy Hamry
- Chrobold: Chroboly
- Chropin: Chropyně
- Chrostau Ölhütten: Chrastová Lhota, p. of Brněnec
- Chroustowitz: Chroustovice
- Chrudim: Chrudim
- Chudenitz: Chudenice
- Chuderitz: Chudeřice
- Chudiwa: Chudenín
- Chumau: Chlumany, now Boletice MTA*
- Chumen: Chlumany
- Chumo: Chlum, p. of Hartmanice (Klatovy District)
- Chunzen: Chlumec (Český Krumlov District)
- Chwalkowitz:
  - Chvalíkovice
  - Chvalkovice (Náchod District)
  - Chválkovice, p. of Olomouc
- Chwalenitz: Chvalenice
- Chwaletitz (Chwalletitz): Chvaletice
- Chwalschowitz: Chvalšovice, p. of Čachrov
- Chwojno: Vysoké Chvojno
- Cimelitz (Czimelitz): Čimelice
- Cirkwitz: Církvice (Kolín District)
- Cischkau: Čížkov (Plzeň-South District)
- Cistowes: Čistěves
- Cizowa: Čížová
- Ckin: Čkyně
- Cyrillhof: Cyrilov, p. of Bory (Žďár nad Sázavou District)
- Czabischau: Čavisov
- Czalositz: Žalhostice
- Czarlowitz: Černovice (Plzeň-South District)
- Czaslau: Čáslav
- Czastrow: Častrov
- Czech: Čechy pod Kosířem
- Czeikowitz: Čejkovice (Hodonín District)
- Czelakowitz: Čelákovice
- Czerhowitz: Cerhovice
- Czetkowitz: Cetkovice
- Czischkow: Čížkov (Pelhřimov District)

== D ==
- Dachau: Dachov, p. of Vlachovo Březí
- Daleschitz: Dalešice (Jablonec nad Nisou District)
- Dalleken: Daleké Popelice, p. of Benešov nad Černou
- Dallwitz: Dalovice (Karlovy Vary District)
- Damadrau: Domoradovice, p. of Hradec nad Moravicí
- Damasko: Damašek, p. of Třemešná
- Damborschitz (Damboritz): Dambořice
- Damirow: Damírov, p. of Zbýšov (Kutná Hora District)
- Damitz:
  - Damice, p. of Krásný Les (Karlovy Vary District)
  - Damnice
- Damnau: Damnov, p. of Bor (Tachov District)
- Darkau: Darkov, p. of Karviná
- Darmschlag: Darmyšl, p. of Staré Sedlo (Tachov District)
- Darowa: Darová, p. of Břasy
- Daschitz: Dašice
- Daßnitz: Dasnice
- Datschitz: Dačice
- Daub: Dub, p. of Starý Jičín
- Dauba: Dubá
- Daubitz: Doubice
- Daubrawitz: Doubravice nad Svitavou
- Daubrawnik: Doubravník
- Daudleb: Doudleby nad Orlicí
- Dawle: Davle
- Deblin: Deblín
- Dechant Gallein: Děkanské Skaliny, p. of Benešov nad Černou
- Dechtar: Dehtáře
- Dechtern: Dehtáře, p. of Žabovřesky (České Budějovice District)
- Deffernik: Debrník, p. of Železná Ruda
- Dehenten: Dehetná, p. of Stráž (Tachov District)
- Dejwitz: Prague-Dejvice
- Dekau: Děkov
- Deslawen (Deslaven): Zdeslav, p. of Čistá (Rakovník District)
- Depoldowitz: Děpoltice, p. of Dešenice
- Dereisen: Zderaz (Chrudim District)
- Derflik: Víska u Jevíčka
- Deschau: Dešov
- Deschenitz: Dešenice
- Deschna: Deštná (Blansko District)
- Deschney: Deštné v Orlických horách
- Dessendorf: Desná (Jablonec nad Nisou District)
- Detenitz (Diettenitz): Dětenice
- Deutsch Beneschau: Benešov nad Černou
- Deutsch Bernschlag: Podlesí, p. of Staré Město pod Landštejnem
- Deutsch Bielau: Bělá nad Svitavou
- Deutsch Borau: Beranovka, p. of Teplá
- Deutsch-Brod (Deutschbrod): Havlíčkův Brod
- Deutsch Brodek: Brodek u Konice
- Deutschbundesort: Dolní Rozmyšl, now Vintířov*
- Deutsch Eisenberg: Ruda, p. of Tvrdkov
- Deutsch Gabel: Jablonné v Podještědí
- Deutsch Gießhübel: Vyskytná nad Jihlavou
- Deutsch Gilowitz: Dolní Jílovice, p. of Vyšší Brod
- Deutsch Haidl: Maňava, now Horní Planá
- Deutsch Hause: Huzová
- Deutsch Horschowitz: Hořovičky
- Deutsch Jassnik: Jeseník nad Odrou
- Deutsch Kahn: Luční Chvojno, p. of Velké Chvojno
- Deutsch Kamnitz: Kamenice, p. of Zákupy
- Deutsch Kilmes: Německý Chloumek, p. of Bochov
- Deutsch Konitz: Miroslavské Knínice
- Deutsch Kopist: Nové Kopisty, p. of Terezín
- Deutsch Kralup: Kralupy u Chomutova, now Málkov (Chomutov District)*
- Deutsch Krawarn: Kravaře
- Deutsch Kubitzen: Nová Kubice, p. of Česká Kubice
- Deutsch Leuten: Dolní Lutyně
- Deutsch Liebau: Libina
- Deutsch Lodenitz: Horní Loděnice
- Deutsch Märzdorf: Horní Bohdíkov, now Velké Losiny
- Deutsch Matha: Česká Metuje
- Deutsch Moliken: Malíkov nad Nežárkou, p. of Horní Pěna
- Deutsch Neudörfel: Podhoří, p. of Ústí nad Labem
- Deutsch Neustadtl: Nové Městečko, p. of Dlouhá Ves (Klatovy District)
- Deutsch Neuhof: Nové Dvory, p. of Polná
- Deutsch Pankraz: Jítrava, p. of Rynoltice
- Deutsch Paulowitz: Slezské Pavlovice
- Deutsch Petersdorf: Petrovičky, p. of Mladkov
- Deutsch Prausnitz: Německá Brusnice, now Hajnice
- Deutsch Reichenau:
  - Rychnov u Nových Hradů, p. of Horní Stropnice
  - Rychnůvek, now Přední Výtoň*
- Deutsch Rust: Podbořanský Rohozec
- Deutsch Schützendorf: Střelecká, now Dobronín
- Deutsch Thomaschlag: Domaslavičky, now Chodová Planá*
- Deutsch Trebetitsch: Nové Třebčice, p. of Veliká Ves (Chomutov District)
- Deutsch Welhotta: Lhota pod Pannou, p. of Homole u Panny
- Deutsch Wernersdorf: Vernéřovice
- Deutsch Zlatnik: Slatinice
- Deutzendorf: Domaslavice, p. of Háj u Duchcova
- Deyschina (Deischina): Dýšina
- Dianaberg: Diana, p. of Rozvadov
- Dieditz: Dědice, p. of Vyškov
- Dielhau: Děhylov
- Dietschan: Děčany
- Dimokur: Dymokury
- Dingkowitz: Jeníkovice, p. of Meclov
- Dirna: Dírná
- Distlowitz: Tisovka, now Boletice MTA*
- Ditmannsdorf (Dittmarsdorf): Dětmarovice
- Dittersbach:
  - Dětřichov (Liberec District)
  - Horní Dobrouč, p. of Dolní Dobrouč
  - Jetřichov
  - Jetřichovice
  - Stašov (Svitavy District)
- Dittersbächel: Detřichovec, p. of Jindřichovice pod Smrkem
- Dittersdorf:
  - Dětřichov (Svitavy District)
  - Dětřichov nad Bystřicí
  - Dětřichov u Moravské Třebové
  - Dětřichov, p. of Světlá Hora
  - Dětřichov, p. of Uničov
  - Větřkovice
- Dittershof: Dětřichov, p. of Jeseník
- Dittmarsdorf (Dittmannsdorf): Dětmarovice
- Diwischau: Divišov
- Diwischowitz: Divišovice, p. of Dešenice
- Dlasckowitz: Dlažkovice
- Dluhe:
  - Dlouhá, p. of Netřebice (Český Krumlov District)
  - Dlouhý, p. of Slavíkov
- Dnespek: Nespeky
- Döba: Děvín
- Döberle: Debrné, now Trutnov*
- Dobern:
  - Dobranov, p. of Česká Lípa
  - Dobrná
- Döberney: Debrné, p. of Mostek (Trutnov District)
- Doberschisch: Dobříš
- Dobeschitz: Dobešice, p. of Kluky (Písek District)
- Doberseik: Dobřečov, p. of Horní Město
- Dobertschitz: Dobrčice
- Dobichau: Dobechov, p. of Kaplice
- Dobischwald: Dobešov, p. of Odry
- Dobraken: Doubravka, p. of Bělá nad Radbuzou
- Dobrassen: Dobroše, p. of Odrava
- Dobrau: Dobrá (Frýdek-Místek District)
- Dobrawod: Dobrá Voda, p. of Toužim
- Dobremielitz: Dobřemilice, p. of Čachrov
- Dobrenitz: Dobřenice
- Dobrenz: Dobronín
- Dobrey: Dobré
- Dobrichowitz: Dobřichovice
- Dobring: Dobřín, now Loučovice*
- Dobrisch (Dobrzisch): Dobříš
- Dobritschan: Dobříčany, p. of Liběšice (Louny District)
- Dobriw: Dobřív
- Dobrkowitz: Dobrkovice
- Dobrochau: Dobrochov
- Dobromielitz (Dobromillitz): Dobromilice
- Dobroslawitz: Dobroslavice
- Dobroten: Dobrotín, p. of Staré Město pod Landštejnem
- Dobrowa: Doubrava, p. of Puclice
- Dobrowitz (Dobrawitz): Dobrovice
- Dobrusch: Dobročkov, p. of Ktiš
- Dobruschka: Dobruška
- Dobschan: Dobřany (Rychnov nad Kněžnou District)
- Dobschikau: Dobříkov, p. of Kdyně
- Dobschitz:
  - Dobrčice, p. of Skršín
  - Dobšice (České Budějovice District)
- Dobrzan: Dobřany (Plzeň-South District)
- Doglasgrün: Vřesová
- Dohle: Dalov, p. of Šternberk
- Dolan:
  - Dolany (Klatovy District)
  - Dolany (Náchod District)
- Dolanken: Dolánky, p. of Ohníč
- Dölitschen: Telice, p. of Prostiboř
- Doll: Důl
- Dollan: Dolany (Plzeň-North District)
- Dollein (Dolein): Dolany (Olomouc District)
- Dollern: Dolany, now Kájov
- Döllnitz: Odolenovice, p. of Krásné Údolí
- Dolniemtsch: Dolní Němčí
- Domamühl: Domamil
- Domanin: Domanín (Jindřichův Hradec District)
- Domaschin: Domašín, p. of Štědrá
- Domaschow: Domašov
- Domauschitz: Domoušice
- Domazlitzl: Domažličky, p. of Bolešiny
- Dombrau: Doubrava (Karviná District)
- Domousnitz: Domousnice
- Domsdorf: Tomíkovice, p. of Žulová
- Domstadtl: Domašov nad Bystřicí
- Donau: Hájek, p. of Všeruby (Domažlice District)
- Donawitz: Stanovice (Karlovy Vary District)
- Dönis: Donín, p. of Hrádek nad Nisou
- Doppitz: Dobětice, now Ústí nad Labem
- Dörfel:
  - Liberec XXV-Vesec
  - Víska, p. of Višňová (Liberec District)
- Dörfles:
  - Vesce, p. of Horní Stropnice
  - Víska u Jevíčka
- Dörflitz: Derflice, p. of Znojmo
- Dorf Stankau: Staňkov II, p. of Staňkov (Domažlice District)
- Dorfteschen: Deštné, p. of Jakartovice
- Dornfeld: Trnové Pole
- Dörnsdorf: Dolina, now Kryštofovy Hamry*
- Dörnthal: Suchdol, p. of Křimov
- Dörrengrund: Suchý Důl
- Dorrstadt: Městiště, p. of Dešenice
- Dörrstein: Suchý Kámen, p. of Chudenín
- Döschen: Dešná (Jindřichův Hradec District)
- Dotterwies: Tatrovice
- Doubrawitz: Doubravice, p. of Moravičany
- Doudlewetz: Doudlevce, p. of Plzeň
- Doxan: Doksany
- Dozitz (Doschitz): Dožice, p. of Mladý Smolivec
- Drachkau: Drahkov
- Drahan: Drahany
- Drahanowitz: Drahanovice
- Drahenitz: Drahenice
- Drahenz: Drahonice
- Drahomischl: Drahomyšl, p. of Lipno (Louny District)
- Drahotusch: Hranice IV-Drahotuše
- Drahowitz: Drahovice, p. of Karlovy Vary
- Drakowa: Drahkov, p. of Modlany
- Draschitz (Drazitz): Dražice (Tábor District)
- Draschkow: Dražkov, p. of Sezemice
- Drasow (Drassow): Drásov (Brno-Country District)
- Drazenov: Draženov
- Dreiborn: Studnice, now Jívka
- Dreibuchen: Buková, now Mohelnice
- Dreihacken: Tři Sekery
- Dreihäuser: Třídomí, now Horní Slavkov*
- Dreihöf:
  - Oldřichovice, p. of Ústí nad Orlicí
  - Záhoří, p. of Žatec
- Dreihöfen: Tři Dvory
- Dreihunken: Drahůnky, p. of Dubí
- Dresnitz: Strážnice
- Drewohostitz: Dřevohostice
- Dries: Dřísy
- Drissgloben: Třískolupy, p. of Přimda
- Drnowitz: Drnovice (Vyškov District)
- Drohau (Drauhau): Drouhavec, p. of Velhartice
- Drosau: Strážov (Klatovy District)
- Droschdein: Droždín, p. of Olomouc
- Drosenau: Drozdov (Šumperk District)
- Droslau: Tvrdoslav, p. of Velhartice
- Drschke: Držkov
- Drzitsch (Dritsch): Dříteč
- Drum: Stvolínky
- Druzetz: Družec
- Drzkow (Drschkow, Drschke): Držkov
- Dub:
  - Dub (Prachatice District)
  - (an der March): Dub nad Moravou
- Dubany: Dubany
- Dubcan: Dubčany
- Duben: Dubné
- Dubenetz: Dubenec (Trutnov District)
- Dubiken: Dubičné
- Dubitz: Dubice, p. of Řehlovice
- Dubitzko: Dubicko
- Dublowitz: Dublovice
- Dubnian: Dubňany
- Dubrowitz: Dubovice
- Dubschan (Dubczan): Dubčany
- Dukowan: Dukovany
- Dumrowitz: Domoradice, p. of Český Krumlov
- Dunkelthal: Temný Důl, p. of Horní Maršov
- Duppau: Doupov, now Hradiště MTA*
- Dürchel: Drchlava, p. of Chlum (Česká Lípa District)
- Dürnbach: Potočiště, p. of Odrava
- Dürnberg: Suchá, p. of Jáchymov
- Dürnholz: Drnholec
- Dürre: Suchá
- Dürrengrün: Výspa, now Luby (Cheb District)*
- Dürrmaul: Drmoul
- Dürrseifen: Suchá Rudná, p. of Světlá Hora
- Duschnik: Trhové Dušníky
- Duschowitz: Tuškov, p. of Kašperské Hory
- Dux: Duchcov
- Dworetz: Dvorec, p. of Radhostice

== E ==
- Ebenau: Zátoňské Dvory, p. of Větřní
- Ebersdorf:
  - Habartice (Liberec District)
  - Habartice, now Krupka
  - Habartice, p. of Jindřichov (Šumperk District)
  - Hybrálec
- Ebmeth: Rovná (Sokolov District)
- Eckersbach: Rokytnice, now Kryštofovo Údolí
- Eckersdorf: Jakartovice
- Edersdorf: Edrovice, p. of Rýmařov
- Edersgrün: Odeř, p. of Hroznětín
- Eger:
  - Cheb
  - Ohře (river)
- Egersee: Vyhlídky, p. of Horní Stropnice
- Eggetschlag: Bližná, p. of Černá v Pošumaví
- Egrisch Reuth: Nebesa, p. of Aš
- Ehrenberg: Loučka, p. of Nový Jičín
- Eibenberg:
  - Tisová, p. of Kraslice
  - Tisová, p. of Nejdek
- Eibenschütz (Eibenschitz): Ivančice
- Eibis: Ivaň (Brno-Country District)
- Eichelhäuser: Dubí, now Lenora (Prachatice District)
- Eichen: Dubí, p. of Kladno
- Eichenhof: Dubina, p. of Šemnice
- Eichhorn Bittitschka (Bititschka): Veverská Bítýška
- Eichicht: Liberec XXIII-Doubí
- Eicht: Dubičná, p. of Úštěk
- Eichwald: Dubí
- Eidlitz: Údlice
- Eiland: Ostrov, now Tisá
- Eilowitz: Jílovec, p. of Fulnek
- Einoth: Renoty, p. of Uničov
- Einsiedel: Mnichov, p. of Vrbno pod Pradědem
- Einsiedel in Isergebirge: Mníšek
- Einsiedl:
  - Mnichov (Cheb District)
  - Mníšek, p. of Nová Ves v Horách
- Poustevna, now Rožmberk nad Vltavou*
- Eipel: Úpice
- Eisenberg:
  - Jezeří, p. of Horní Jiřetín*
  - Ruda (Žďár nad Sázavou District)
  - (an der March): Ruda nad Moravou
- Eisenbrod: Železný Brod
- Eisendorf: Železná, p. of Bělá nad Radbuzou
- Eisengrub: Záhliní, now Hořice na Šumavě*
- Eisenhüttel: Záchlumí (Tachov District)
- Eisenstadtel (Eisenstadtl): Železnice
- Eisenstein: Železná Ruda
- Eisenstraß: Hojsova Stráž, p. of Železná Ruda
- Eisgrub: Lednice
- Eiwan: Ivaň (Prostějov District)
- Eiwanowitz in der Hanna: Ivanovice na Hané
- Elbe: Labe (river)
- Elbekosteletz: Kostelec nad Labem
- Elbeteinitz: Týnec nad Labem
- Elbleiten: Labská Stráň
- Elbogen:
  - Loket
  - Milbohov, p. of Stebno
- Elend: Nemrlov, now Oskava
- Elendbachel: Polka, p. of Horní Vltavice*
- Eleonorenhain: Lenora (Prachatice District)
- Elexnitz: Olešnice (České Budějovice District)
- Elhenitz: Lhenice
- Elhotten:
  - Lhota, p. of Bor (Tachov District)
  - (bei Mies): Lhota u Stříbra, p. of Stříbro
- Elisenthal: Alžbětín, p. of Železná Ruda
- Elisienthal: Oslí Mlýneček, now Nový Kramolín
- Ellgoth:
  - Lhota, p. of Háj ve Slezsku
  - (Ellguth): Lhotka, p. of Ostrava
- Ellhoten: Lhota, p. of Plzeň
- Ellischau: Nalžovy, p. of Nalžovské Hory
- Elm: Stráň, p. of Sadov
- Elsch: Olešná, p. of Stráž (Tachov District)
- Elschelin: Lšelín, p. of Kostelec (Tachov District)
- Elstin (Elschtin):
  - Lštění, p. of Blížejov
  - Lštění, p. of Radhostice
- Emaus:
  - Emauzy, p. of Vražné
  - Nemojov
- Emern (Emmern): Bednáře, now Černá v Pošumaví
- Endersdorf: Ondřejovice, p. of Zlaté Hory
- Endersgrün: Ondřejov
- Engelhaus (Engelsberg): Andělská Hora (Karlovy Vary District)
- Engelsberg: Andělská Hora (Bruntál District)
- Engelsdorf: Andělka, p. of Višňová (Liberec District)
- Engelsthal: Andělské Žleby, now Loučná nad Desnou
- Engelswald: Mošnov
- Engelthal: Jesenný
- Enkengrün: Jankovice, p. of Teplá
- Ensenbruck: Povodí, p. of Třebeň
- Epperswagen: Nepřívaz, now Libavá MTA*
- Erdberg: Hrádek (Znojmo District)
- Erdmannsdorf: Nové Zálužné, now Radkov (Opava District)
- Erdweis: Nová Ves nad Lužnicí
- Erlitz: Orlice, p. of Letohrad
- Ermelei: Jermaly, now Kaplice*
- Ermesgrün: Smrčina, p. of Plesná
- Ernstberg: Arnoštka, p. of Vimperk
- Ernstbrunn: Arnoštov, p. of Křišťanov
- Ertischowitz: Rtišovice, p. of Milín
- Esche: Eš
- Eschen: Jasenná (Náchod District)
- Eschowitz: Čečkovice, p. of Bor (Tachov District)
- Espenthor: Olšová Vrata, p. of Karlovy Vary
- Esseklee: Nesachleby, now Znojmo
- Eulau: Jílové
- Eule:
  - Jílové u Prahy
  - Sovín, now Albrechtice v Jizerských horách
- Eulenberg: Sovinec, p. of Jiříkov (Bruntál District)
- Eulhütten: Sova, now Hartmanice (Klatovy District)*
- Eywan: Evaň

== F ==
- Falgendorf (Falkendorf): Horka u Staré Paky
- Falkenau:
  - Falknov, p. of Kytlice
  - Sokolíčko, p. of Stonařov
- Falkenau an der Eger: Sokolov
- Falkendorf: Děčín XXVIII-Folknáře
- Fassattengrün: Božetín, p. of Nový Kostel
- Felden: Pole, p. of Jablonné v Podještědí
- Feldkretschen: Krčmov, now Adršpach
- Feldsberg: Valtice
- Ferbenz: Rvenice, p. of Postoloprty
- Ferbka: Vrbka, p. of Postoloprty
- Ferchenhaid: Borová Lada
- Ferdinandsdorf: Ferdinandov, p. of Choustníkovo Hradiště
- Ferdinandsthal: Ferdinandov, p. of Hejnice (Liberec District)
- Fichtau: Smrčná, p. of Nová Bystřice
- Fichtenbach: Bystřice, now Česká Kubice*
- Fichtenheid: Smrčná, p. of Svatá Maří
- Filz: Slatina, p. of Horní Vltavice*
- Finkendorf: Polesí, p. of Rynoltice
- Fischbach: Rybná, p. of Pernink
- Fischern:
  - Hranice V-Rybáře
  - Rybáře, p. of Karlovy Vary
  - Stěžerov, p. of Hořice na Šumavě
- Fischhäusel: Hostěrádky, now Vranovská Ves
- Flecken: Fleky, p. of Chudenín
- Fleißen: Plesná
- Fleissheim: Horní Borková, now Horní Planá*
- Fleyh: Fláje, p. of Český Jiřetín
- Flöhau: Blšany
- Flößberg: Plešivec, p. of Český Krumlov
- Försterhäuser: Myslivny, now Boží Dar
- Fonsau: Vonšov, p. of Skalná
- Forbes: Borovany
- Forstbad: Lázně Fořt, now Rudník (Trutnov District)
- Fösselhof: Svachova Lhotka, p. of Mirkovice
- Frain: Vranov nad Dyjí
- Frainersdorf: Vranovská Ves
- Frainspitz: Branišovice
- Frankenhammer: Prague-Liboc
- Frankenhammer: Liboc, p. of Kraslice
- Frankstadt: Nový Malín
- Frankstadt (unter dem Radhoscht): Frenštát pod Radhoštěm
- Franowa: Vránov, p. of Staňkov (Domažlice District)
- Franzberg:
  - Františkov, now Velké Kunětice
  - Františkův Vrch, p. of Huntířov
- Franzdorf: Františkov, p. of Blížejov
- Franzendorf: Liberec X-Františkov
- Franzensbad: Františkovy Lázně
- Franzensthal: Františkov, p. of Kvilda
- Franzenthal-Ulgersdorf: Františkov nad Ploučnicí
- Franzthal: Dolina, p. of Vilémov (Děčín District)
- Fratting: Vratěnín
- Frauenberg:
  - Hluboká nad Vltavou
  - Panenská Hůrka, p. of Bílý Kostel nad Nisou
- Frauendorf: Panenská, p. of Jemnice
- Frauenreith: Svobodka, p. of Halže
- Frauenreuth: Kopanina, p. of Nový Kostel
- Frauenthal:
  - Frantoly, now Loučovice*
  - Frantoly, p. of Mičovice
  - Pohled (Havlíčkův Brod District)
- Frauschile: Vrahožily, p. of Rtyně nad Bílinou
- Frei Hermersdorf: Svobodné Heřmanice
- Freiberg in Böhmen: Příbram
- Freiberg (in Mähren): Příbor
- Freidau: Frýdava, now Přední Výtoň
- Freidorf (Freydorf):
  - Svobodín, p. of Dolní Bousov
  - Svobodná Ves, now Úštěk
- Freiheit (an der Aupa): Svoboda nad Úpou
- Freiheitsau: Háj ve Slezsku
- Freiheitsberg: Svobodín, now Vernířovice*
- Freihöls: Stará Lhota, p. of Nýrsko
- Freihofen: Svobodné Dvory, p. of Hradec Králové
- Freistadt: Fryštát, p. of Karviná
- Freistadtl: Fryšták
- Freistein: Podhradí nad Dyjí
- Freiung: Lipka, p. of Vimperk
- Freiwaldau: Jeseník
- Freudenberg: Veselé (Děčín District)
- Freudenheim: Veselíčko 1. díl, p. of Veselé (Děčín District)
- Freudenthal: Bruntál
- Friedau: Frýdava, now Frymburk
- Friedberg: Frymburk
- Friedeberg: Žulová
- Friedek (Friedeck): Frýdek, p. of Frýdek-Místek
- Friedek-Mistek: Frýdek-Místek
- Friedenau: Mírovka, p. of Havlíčkův Brod
- Friedersdorf: Čaková
- Friedersreuth: Pastviny, p. of Hranice (Cheb District)
- Friedland an der Mohra: Břidličná
- Friedland (an der Ostrawitza): Frýdlant nad Ostravicí
- Friedland in Böhmen: Frýdlant
- Friedrichschlag (Fridretschlag): Bedřichov, p. of Horní Stropnice
- Friedrichsdorf: Bedřichov, p. of Oskava
- Friedrichshain: Liberec XXXIV-Bedřichovka
- Friedrichshof: Bedřichov, now Rybník (Domažlice District)*
- Friedrichshütten: Nová Huť, p. of Nemanice
- Friedrichsthal: Chalupy, p. of Všeruby (Domažlice District)
- Friedrichswald:
  - Bedřichov (Jablonec nad Nisou District)
  - Hnátnice
- Friedstein: Frýdštejn
- Friesendorf: Březná, p. of Štíty
- Frischau: Břežany (Znojmo District)
- Frischau: Fryšava pod Žákovou horou
- Fritschowitz: Fryčovice
- Frobelhof: Lední Domky, now Sosnová (Opava District)
- Frohenbruck (an der Lainsitz): Veselí nad Lužnicí
- Fröhlichsdorf: Veselí, p. of Štětí
- Frohnau: Vranov, now Rovná (Sokolov District)*
- Fröllersdorf: Jevišovka
- Frühbuß: Přebuz
- Fuchsberg:
  - Liščí, p. of Chudenín
  - Lišcí Hora, p. of Rybník (Domažlice District)*
- Füllerdörfel: Vesnička, p. of Prysk
- Füllstein: Bohušov
- Fünfhunden: Pětipsy
- Fünfzighuben: Padesát Lánů, now Potštát
- Fürstenbruck: Kněžmost
- Fürstenhut: Knížecí Pláně, p. of Borová Lada*
- Fürstenwalde: Knížecí, p. of Velký Šenov
- Fürthel: Brůdek, p. of Všeruby (Domažlice District)
- Fürwitz:
  - Vrbice, p. of Hořovičky
  - Vrbice u Bezdružic, p. of Lestkov (Tachov District)
- Fugau: Fukov, now Šluknov*
- Fulnek: Fulnek
- Funkenstein: Háje, p. of Kolová
- Fussdorf: Rantířov

== G ==
- Gabel:
  - Jablonné v Podještědí
  - Vidly, p. of Vrbno pod Pradědem
- Gabel an der Adler: Jablonné nad Orlicí
- Gaberhäuser: Podstrání, p. of Rovná (Sokolov District)
- Gaberle: Javoří, p. of Hartmanice (Klatovy District)
- Gabersdorf: Libeč, p. of Trutnov
- Gabhorn: Javorná, p. of Bochov
- Gablonz:
  - (an der Neiße): Jablonec nad Nisou
  - Jabloneček, p. of Ralsko
- Gabrielahütten: Gabrielina Huť, now Kalek*
- Gabrielendorf: Gabrielka, p. of Kamenice nad Lipou
- Gaierle: Kavrlík, p. of Kašperské Hory
- Gaischwitz: Kýšovice, p. of Výsluní
- Gaisdorf: Kyžlířov, p. of Potštát
- Gaiwitz: Kyjovice (Znojmo District)
- Galtenhof: Branka, p. of Halže
- Gamnitz: Jemnice, p. of Tisová (Tachov District)
- Gängerhof: Chodov (Karlovy Vary District)
- Gansau: Pravětín, p. of Vimperk
- Gansauerhaid: Pravětínská Lada, now Borová Lada*
- Garschönthal: Úvaly, p. of Valtice
- Gärten: Zahrady, p. of Krásná Lípa
- Gartitz: Skorotice, p. of Ústí nad Labem
- Gässing: Jesen
- Gaßnitz: Jesenice, p. of Okrouhlá (Cheb District)
- Gastorf: Hoštka
- Gatterschlag: Kačlehy
- Gauendorf: Mokré, p. of Litvínovice
- Gaya (Geyen): Kyjov
- Gayer: Gajer, p. of Janov (Svitavy District)
- Gebharz: Skalka, p. of Nová Bystřice
- Gebirgskamnitz: Horská Kamenice, p. of Železný Brod
- Gebirgsneudorf: Nová Ves v Horách
- Gehaag: Háje, p. of Cheb
- Gehae: Háj, p. of Radonice (Chomutov District)
- Gehäng: Láz, p. of Nová Pec
- Geiersberg: Letohrad
- Geiersgraben: Čertův Důl, now Zdobnice
- Geislersfeld: Lomy, now Supíkovice
- Georgendorf: Český Jiřetín
- Georgengrund: Jirský Důl, now Staré Buky*
- Georgenthal: Jiřetín pod Bukovou
- Georgswalde: Jiříkov
- Geppersdorf:
  - Kopřivná
  - Linhartovy, p. of Město Albrechtice
- Geppertsau: Keprtovice, now Libavá MTA*
- Gerbetschlag: Herbertov, p. of Vyšší Brod
- Gereuthern: Jitronice, now Pohorská Ves*
- Gerlsdorf: Jerlochovice, p. of Fulnek
- Gersdorf:
  - Kerhartice, p. of Česká Kamenice
  - Mezihoří, p. of Blatno (Chomutov District)
- Gerstenfeld: Ječmeniště, now Vrbovec*
- Gerten: Krty
- Gesen: Jesení, p. of Čachrov
- Geserzen: Jezerce, p. of Stříbro
- Gesmesgrün: Osvinov, p. of Stráž nad Ohří
- Gesna: Jezná, p. of Úlice
- Gessing: Jesínky, p. of Bochov
- Gesteinigt: Kamenná, p. of Jílové
- Gestrzeby (Jestreby): Jestřebí (Šumperk District)
- Gestob: Ždov, p. of Radonice (Chomutov District)
- Geweihtenbrunn: Boží Voda, now Liběchov
- Gewitsch: Jevíčko
- Gfell: Kfely, p. of Ostrov (Karlovy Vary District)
- Gibacht: Pozorka, p. of Nejdek
- Gibian: Jivjany, p. of Velký Malahov
- Giebau: Jívová
- Giessdorf: Jišterpy, p. of Chotiněves
- Gießhübel:
  - Kyselov, now Olomouc
  - Olešnice v Orlických horách
  - Vyskytná nad Jihlavou
- Gießhübl (Gießhübel):
  - Boršov, now Malšín
  - Stružná
- Gießhübl-Sauerbrunn (Gießhübel-Puchstein): Kyselka
- Gilschwitz: Kylešovice, p. of Opava
- Girnberg: Zadní Milíře, p. of Milíře
- Girsch: Krsy
- Girschen: Jeřeň, p. of Valeč (Karlovy Vary District)
- Girschowa: Krsov, p. of Ostrov u Bezdružic
- Girsig: Jiříkov (Bruntál District)
- Gitschin: Jičín
- Glasau: Neblašov, p. of Chodský Újezd
- Glasberg: Sklená, p. of Kraslice
- Glasdörfel: Sklené, p. of Malá Morava
- Glaselsdorf: Sklené (Svitavy District)
- Glasern: Klažary, p. of Kamenná (České Budějovice District)
- Glashof: Skláře, p. of Hořice na Šumavě
- Glashütten:
  - Hutě, p. of Cejle
  - Skelná Huť, p. of Chudenín
  - Skelná Huť, now Horní Planá*
  - Skláře, p. of Vimperk
- Glasshüte: Skelná Huť, now Libavá MTA*
- Glatzen: Kladská, p. of Mariánské Lázně
- Gleimen: Hliněná, p. of Malšovice
- Glemkau: Hlinka (Bruntál District)
- Glieden: Lideň, p. of Málkov (Chomutov District)
- Glitschau: Klíčov, p. of Kočov
- Glöckelberg: Zvonková, now Horní Planá
- Glomnitz: Hlavnice
- Glosau: Dlažov
- Gmünd (Gmünd-Bahnhof, Gmünd III): České Velenice
- Gnadlersdorf: Hnanice
- Gnoitz: Hnojice
- Gobitschau: Chabičov, p. of Šternberk
- Godrusch: Jadruž, p. of Stráž (Tachov District)
- Göding: Hodonín
- Göhe: Háj, p. of Habartice (Liberec District)
- Göhren: Klíny
- Gojau: Kájov
- Goldberg: Zlatá, now Boletice MTA*
- Goldbrunn
  - Balda, now Stašov (Svitavy District)
  - Zlatá Studna, now Horská Kvilda*
- Golddorf: Zlatá, p. of Kynšperk nad Ohří
- Goldeck: Staré Město (Šumperk District)
- Goldendorf: Zlatá
- Goldenhöhe: Zlatý Kopec, p. of Boží Dar
- Goldenfluß: Zlatý Potok, p. of Malá Morava
- Goldenkron: Zlatá Koruna
- Goldenöls: Zlatá Olešnice (Trutnov District)
- Goldenstein: Branná
- Goldwag: Řešanov, now Planá
- Gollitsch: Kaliště, p. of Bohdalovice
- Göllitz: Jedlice, now Nové Hrady (České Budějovice District)*
- Gollnetschlag: Klení, p. of Benešov nad Černou
- Goltsch Jenikau: Golčův Jeníkov
- Görkau: Jirkov
- Görsdorf: Loučná, p. of Hrádek nad Nisou
- Gösen: Kadaňská Jeseň, p. of Kadaň
- Gossau:
  - Kosov, p. of Bor (Tachov District)
  - Kosov, p. of Jihlava
- Gossengrün: Krajková
- Goßmaul: Kosmová, p. of Toužim
- Gossolup: Horní Kozolupy
- Gotschdorf: Hošťálkovy
- Göttersdorf: Boleboř
- Gottesgab: Boží Dar
- Gottmannsgrün: Trojmezí, p. of Hranice (Cheb District)
- Gottschau: Kočov
- Götzdorf: Božíkov, p. of Zákupy
- Grabau: Hrabová, p. of Ostrava
- Graben: Strouhy, now Boletice MTA*
- Graber: Kravaře (Česká Lípa District)
- Gradlitz: Choustníkovo Hradiště
- Gräfenberg: Gräfenberk, now Jeseník
- Grafendorf:
  - Hrabětice
  - Hrabětice, p. of Janov nad Nisou
  - Hrabětice, p. of Jeseník nad Odrou
- Grafenhütte: Hraběcí Huť, p. of Kvilda
- Grafenried: Lučina
- Grafenstein: Grabštejn
- Grambach: Potočná, p. of Číměř (Jindřichův Hradec District)
- Granesau: Chranišov, p. of Nové Sedlo (Sokolov District)
- Gränzendorf: Hraničná, p. of Janov nad Nisou
- Gränzdorf: Hraničky, p. of Uhelná
- Gränzgrund: Hraničná, now Skorošice*
- Grasengrün: Hájek (Karlovy Vary District)
- Grasfurth: Brod, now Stožec*
- Graslitz: Kraslice
- Grasset: Jehličná, p. of Královské Poříčí*
- Gratschen: Radešín, p. of Chuderov
- Grätz: Hradec nad Moravicí
- Gratzen: Nové Hrady (České Budějovice District)
- Graupen: Krupka
- Greifendorf: Hradec nad Svitavou
- Grenzdörfel: Pomeznice, p. of Meziměstí
- Griesbach: Křemenitá, now Tatrovice
- Gritschau: Krčín, p. of Horní Stropnice
- Grodischt: Hradiště, p. of Těrlicko
- Gröditz-Neudorf: Hradec-Nová Ves
- Gröna: Křínov, p. of Planá
- Gröschlmaut: Grešlové Mýto
- Groschau: Chrašťany, p. of Krásný Dvůr
- Groß Aujezd (Groß Augezd, Groß Aujest): Velký Újezd
- Groß Aupa: Velká Úpa, p. of Pec pod Sněžkou
- Großbieltsch: Běleč nad Orlicí
- Groß Bechar: Běchary
- Groß Beranau: Velký Beranov
- Groß Bistrzitz: Valašská Bystřice
- Groß Bittesch: Velká Bíteš
- Großblanitz: Blanice, p. of Bavorov
- Groß Blatnitz (Groß Blattnitz): Blatnice pod Svatým Antonínkem
- Großblatzen: Blatce
- Groß Bocken: Velká Bukovina
- Groß Borowitz: Borovnice (Trutnov District)
- Groß Bürglitz: Velký Vřešťov
- Groß Butschin: Velká Bučina, p. of Velvary
- Groß Cakowitz: Prague-Čakovice
- Groß Cejtitz: Čejetice, p. of Mladá Boleslav
- Groß Cekau: Čakov (České Budějovice District)
- Groß Cermna: Velká Čermná, p. of Čermná nad Orlicí
- Groß Darkowitz: Darkovice
- Gross Deschau: Velký Dešov, now Dešov
- Groß Dittersdorf: Čermná, now Libavá MTA*
- Großdorf:
  - Veliká Ves (Prague-East District)
  - Velká Ves, p. of Broumov
- Groß Drewitsch: Velký Dřevíč, p. of Hronov
- Groß Drossen: Velké Strážné, now Světlík*
- Grosse: Hrozová, p. of Rusín
- Großenteich: Velký Rybník, p. of Hroznětín
- Großfürwitz: Vrbice (Karlovy Vary District)
- Groß Gallein: Velké Skaliny, p. of Benešov nad Černou
- Groß Glockersdorf: Klokočov, p. of Vítkov
- Groß Gorschin: Velký Horšín, now Rybník (Domažlice District)*
- Groß Grillowitz: České Křídlovice, now Božice
- Groß Gropitzreith (Großgropitzreith): Velký Rapotín, p. of Tachov
- Groß Grünau: Velký Grunov, p. of Brniště
- Groß Gürsch: Krsy
- Großhaid: Velký Bor
- Groß Hammer (Großhammer): Velké Hamry
- Groß Heilendorf: Postřelmov
- Groß Heinrichschlag: Velký Jindřichov, p. of Benešov nad Černou
- Groß Hermsdorf: Heřmanice u Oder
- Großherrlitz (Groß Herrlitz): Velké Heraltice
- Groß Herrndorf: Kněžice (Chrudim District)
- Großherrndorf (Großhirndorf): Kněžice, p. of Jablonné v Podještědí
- Groß Hitschitz: Velké Hydčice
- Groß Hluschitz: Hlušice
- Groß Holletitz: Holedeč
- Großhorka: Hrubá Horka, p. of Železný Brod
- Groß Hoschütz: Velké Hoštice
- Groß Hrabowa: Hrabová, p. of Ostrava
- Groß Hubina: Velký Hubenov, p. of Snědovice
- Groß Jentsch (Groß-Jenc): Jeneč
- Groß Jessenitz: Velká Jesenice
- Groß Jirna: Jirny
- Groß Jober: Velká Javorská, p. of Žandov
- Groß Karlowitz: Velké Karlovice
- Groß Kaudern: Chuderov
- Groß Kletzan: Klecany
- Groß Kostomlat: Kostomlaty nad Labem
- Groß Kraschtitz: Chraštice
- Groß Krosse: Velká Kraš
- Groß Kuchel: Prague-Velká Chuchle
- Groß Kuntschitz: Kunčice pod Ondřejníkem
- Großkunzendorf: Kunčice, p. of Ostrava
- Groß Kunzendorf: Velké Kunětice
- Groß Latein: Slatinice
- Groß Lhotta: Lhota (Zlín District)
- Großloh: Velký Luh
- Großlohowitz: Hlohovice
- Groß Losenitz (Groß Lossenitz): Velká Losenice
- Groß Lowtschitz: Lovčice (Hodonín District)
- Großlubigau (Groß Lubigau): Velký Hlavákov, p. of Valeč (Karlovy Vary District)
- Gross Lukau: Lukov (Zlín District)
- Großmallowa: Velký Malahov
- Großmalowitz: Malovice
- Groß Meierhöfen: Velké Dvorce, p. of Přimda
- Großmergthal: Mařenice
- Gross Meseritsch (Großmeseritsch): Velké Meziříčí
- Großmohrau: Velká Morava, p. of Dolní Morava
- Groß Morschin (Gross-Morzin): Mořina
- Groß Nehwizd: Nehvizdy
- Gross Niemtschitz: Velké Němčice
- Groß Olbersdorf: Velké Albrechtice
- Groß Olkowitz: Oleksovice
- Groß Opatowitz: Velké Opatovice
- Groß Opolan: Opolany
- Groß Orzechau: Velký Ořechov
- Groß Otschehau: Očihov
- Groß Pantschen: Velký Pěčín, p. of Dačice
- Gross Pawlowitz: Velké Pavlovice
- Groß Petersdorf: Horní Vražné, now Vražné
- Groß Peterswald: Petřvald (Nový Jičín District)
- Groß Petrowitz: Petrovice
- Groß Pohlom: Velká Polom
- Groß Poidl: Podolí, p. of Mohelnice
- Großpopowitz: Velké Popovice
- Groß Poreschin: Pořešín, p. of Kaplice
- Groß Poric: Velké Poříčí
- Groß Priesen (Großpriesen): Velké Březno
- Groß Prossenitz: Velké Prosenice, now Prosenice
- Groß Pschilep: Velké Přílepy
- Groß Pulitz: Pulice, p. of Dobruška
- Groß Raden: Radim, p. of Brantice
- Groß Rammerschlag: Velký Ratmírov
- Groß Rasel (Groß Raasel): Rájec
- Groß Ritte: Řetová
- Groß Schinian: Žíňany, p. of Soběhrdy
- Groß Schönau (Großschönau): Velký Šenov
- Groß Schüttüber: Velká Šitbor, p. of Milíkov (Cheb District)
- Groß Schwadowitz: Velké Svatoňovice
- Groß Seelowitz: Židlochovice
- Groß Senitz: Senice na Hané
- Groß Sichdichfür: Velká Hleďsebe
- Groß Skal: Hrubá Skála
- Groß Spinelsdorf: Velká Lesná, now Hradiště MTA*
- Groß Steurowitz: Starovice
- Groß Stohl: Velká Štáhle
- Groß Strodau: Stradov, p. of Omlenice
- Groß Tajax: Dyjákovice
- Groß Teinitz: Velký Týnec
- Groß Temelin: Temelín
- Groß Trestny: Velké Tresné
- Groß Tschakowitz: Čakovice
- Großtschekau: Čakov (České Budějovice District)
- Groß Tschernitz: Velká Černoc, p. of Měcholupy (Louny District)
- Groß Tschernosek (Groß Czernosek): Velké Žernoseky
- Groß Tschochau: Řehlovice
- Groß Ullersdorf: Velké Losiny
- Groß Umlowitz: Omlenice
- Groß Uretschlag: Černíkov
- Groß Urhau: Ořechov (Brno-Country District)
- Groß Walten: Velký Valtinov
- Groß Waltersdorf: Velká Střelná, now Libavá MTA*
- Großwasser: Hrubá Voda, p. of Hlubočky
- Großwehlen (Großwöhlen): Děčín XXX-Velká Veleň
- Groß Werscheditz: Verušice, p. of Žlutice
- Groß Wisternitz: Velká Bystřice
- Groß Witschitz: Vitčice, p. of Veliká Ves (Chomutov District)
- Groß Wonetitz: Bonětice, p. of Stráž (Tachov District)
- Groß Wosek: Velký Osek
- Groß Woslawitz: Oslavice
- Groß Wosnalitz: Osinalice, p. of Medonosy
- Großwossek: Velký Osek
- Groß Wrbka: Hrubá Vrbka
- Groß Wschelis: Velké Všelisy
- Groß Würben: Velké Vrbno, now Staré Město (Šumperk District)
- Groß Würbka (Groß Wrbka): Hrubá Vrbka
- Groß Zdikau: Zdíkov
- Groß Ziegenruck: Velký Kozí Hřbet, p. of Rejštejn
- Groß Zmietsch: Smědeč, p. of Ktiš
- Grottau: Hrádek nad Nisou
- Grub: Jáma, p. of Mičovice
- Grün
  - Doubrava, p. of Aš
  - Louka, p. of Nová Ves (Sokolov District)
  - Novina, p. of Sokolov
  - Zelená, p. of Skalná
  - Zelená Lhota, p. of Nýrsko
- Grünau: Gruna
- Grünberg:
  - Zelená Hora (Vyškov District)
  - Zelená Hora, p. of Kraslice
- Grünlas: Loučky, p. of Nové Sedlo (Sokolov District)
- Grünwald:
  - Pastviny, now Moldava (Teplice District)*
  - Zelený, p. of Úštěk
- Grünwald an der Neiße: Mšeno nad Nisou, p. of Jablonec nad Nisou
- Grulich: Králíky
- Grumberg: Podlesí, p. of Malá Morava
- Grunddorf: Dlouhá Ves, p. of Hynčina
- Grundmühlen: Mlýny, p. of Hrob
- Grussbach: Hrušovany nad Jevišovkou
- Gschwendt: Světví, p. of Horní Stropnice
- Gsenget: Pomezí
- Gstom: Stan, p. of Lestkov (Tachov District)
- Gügel: Dolní Bukovina and Horní Bukovina, now Levín
- Güntersdorf: Huntířov
- Gürsch: Krsy
- Guldenfurth: Brod nad Dyjí
- Gumplitz: Kumpolec, p. of Tisová (Tachov District)
- Gumpolds: Humpolec
- Gundersdorf: Guntramovice, p. of Budišov nad Budišovkou
- Gundrum: Komořany (Vyškov District)
- Guratin: Krtín, p. of Skapce
- Gurein: Kuřim
- Gurenitz: Skoronice, p. of Bujanov
- Gurim: Kouřim
- Gurschdorf: Skorošice
- Gurwitz: Krhovice
- Gut Wellowitz: Bílovice
- Gutbrunn: Dobrá Voda, now Jablonec nad Nisou
- Gutenbrunn: Meziluží, p. of Horní Stropnice
- Gutenfeld: Dobruška
- Guthausen: Dobrá, p. of Stožec
- Guttenfeld: Dobré Pole
- Guttowitz (Kottowitz): Kotovice
- Gutwasser: Dobrá Voda u Českých Budějovic

== H ==
- Haag: Zahrádka, p. of Rožmitál na Šumavě
- Haan: Háj u Duchcova
- Haardt: Staré Hobzí
- Haatsch: Hať
- Habakladrau: Ovesné Kladruby
- Haber: Habřina, p. of Úštěk
- Haberdorf: Ovesná, p. of Benešov nad Ploučnicí
- Habern: Habry
- Habersbirk: Habartov
- Habicht: Jestřabí, now Libavá MTA*
- Hablesreith: Havlov, now Rožmitál na Šumavě*
- Habrina: Habřina
- Habrowan:
  - Habrovany (Ústí nad Labem District)
  - Habrovany (Vyškov District)
- Habrzi: Habří, p. of Řehlovice
- Hackelhöf: Haklovy Dvory, now České Budějovice
- Habstein (Habichstein): Jestřebí (Česká Lípa District)
- Hackenhäuser: Sekerské Chalupy, p. of Stará Voda (Cheb District)
- Hadruwa: Hadrava, p. of Chudenín
- Hafnerluden: Lubnice (Znojmo District)
- Hafnern: Klení, now Hořice na Šumavě*
- Hagengrün: Zeleny Háj, p. of Vojtanov
- Hagensdorf: Ahníkov, now Málkov (Chomutov District)*
- Haid:
  - Bor (Tachov District)
  - Bor, p. of Sadov
- Haida: Nový Bor
- Haidberg: Vřesná, now Frymburk
- Haidedörfel: Boreček, p. of Ralsko
- Haidl:
  - Lomek, now Boletice MTA*
  - Zhůří, p. of Rejštejn
- Hainbuchen: Habřina
- Haindorf:
  - Hajnice
  - Hejnice (Liberec District)
- Hainspach: Lipová (Děčín District)
- Haje: Háje nad Jizerou
- Halbendorf: Polouvsí, p. of Jeseník nad Odrou
- Halbgebäu: Podílná, now Hazlov
- Halbmeil: Rozhraní
- Halbstadt: Meziměstí
- Hallenkau: Halenkov
- Halmgrün: Podlesí, p. of Sadov
- Hals: Halže
- Hammer: Hamr, p. of Litvínov
- Hammer am See: Hamr na Jezeře
- Hammerhäuseln: Hamrníky, p. of Mariánské Lázně
- Hammern:
  - České Hamry, p. of Strážov (Klatovy District)
  - Hamry (Klatovy District)
- Hammerstadt: Vlastějovice
- Hamstein: Hamštejn, p. of Koberovy
- Hangendorf: Svahy, p. of Planá
- Hangenstein: Skály, p. of Horní Město
- Hannersdorf: Jindrišská, p. of Jirkov
- Hannsdorf: Hanušovice
- Haratitz: Haratice, p. of Plavy
- Hardetschlag: Hartunkov, p. of Benešov nad Černou
- Hareth: Horany
- Harlosee: Horní Polžice, p. of Bezdružice
- Harrachsdorf:
  - Harrachov
  - Harrachov, p. of Rýmařov
- Harrachsthal: Harrachov, p. of Šluknov
- Hart: Lesina, p. of Třebeň
- Harta: Podhůří, p. of Vrchlabí
- Hartenberg: Hřebeny, p. of Josefov (Sokolov District)
- Hartessenreuth: Hartoušov, p. of Nebanice
- Hartlas: Lesinka, p. of Třebeň
- Härtlings: Hořepník
- Hartmanitz: Hartmanice (Klatovy District)
- Hartmannsgrün: Lučiny, p. of Doupovské Hradiště
- Hartowitz: Hrdějovice
- Haschowa: Hašov, p. of Horšovský Týn
- Hasel: Líska, p. of Česká Kamenice
- Haselbach: Lísková, p. of Nemanice
- Haselberg: Lískovec, now Nemanice*
- Haslau: Hazlov
- Haslicht: Varhošť, now Libavá MTA*
- Haßlitz: Haslice, p. of Homole u Panny
- Hatschein: Hejčín, p. of Olomouc
- Hatzles: Hodslav, now Vyšší Brod*
- Hau: Horní Pochlovice, p. of Kaceřov (Sokolov District)
- Hauenstein: Horní Hrad, p. of Krásný Les (Karlovy Vary District)
- Hauptmannsdorf: Hejtmánkovice
- Hausbrunn: Úsobrno
- Hausdorf: Hukovice, p. of Bartošovice
- Hawlovitz: Havlovice
- Hawran: Havraň
- Hegeholz: Hajniště, now Jeníkov (Teplice District)*
- Hegewald: Hajniště, p. of Nové Město pod Smrkem
- Heideburg: Borohrádek
- Heidenpiltsch: Bílčice
- Heidenstein: Kámen (Děčín District)
- Heidles: Borek, now Ostrov (Karlovy Vary District)
- Heilbrunn: Hojná Voda, p. of Horní Stropnice
- Heiligen: Světce, p. of Tachov
- Heiligenberg: Svatý Kopeček, p. of Olomouc
- Heiligenkreuz:
  - Chodský Újezd
  - Svatý Kříž, now Cheb
  - Svatý Kříž, p. of Havlíčkův Brod
  - Újezd Svatého Kříže, p. of Bělá nad Radbuzou
- Heiligenulrich: Světce
- Heiligkreuz: Újezd u Svatého Kříže
- Heindorf:
  - Hájov, p. of Příbor
  - Hejnov, p. of Holčovice
- Heinersdorf am Jeschken: Liberec XXIV-Pilínkov
- Heinersdorf an der Tafelfichte: Jindřichovice pod Smrkem
- Heinitz: Hejnice (Ústí nad Orlicí District)
- Heinrichs: Velká Bíteš
- Heinrichsberg: Jindřichova Hora, p. of Klenčí pod Čerchovem
- Heinrichschlag: Jindřiš, p. of Rodvínov
- Heinrichsdorf: Jindřichova Ves, p. of Kalek
- Heinrichsgrün: Jindřichovice (Sokolov District)
- Heinrichsheid: Jindřichovice, p. of Kolinec
- Heinrichsöd: Hrdoňov, now Frymburk
- Heinrichsthal: Jindřichov (Šumperk District)
- Heinzendorf:
  - Henčov, p. of Jihlava
  - Hynčice (Náchod District)
  - Hynčice, p. of Město Albrechtice
  - Hynčice, p. of Vražné
- Heinzendorf an der March: Hynčice nad Moravou, p. of Hanušovice
- Heinzhof: Hynčina
- Helmbach: Michlova Huť, p. of Vimperk
- Hemmehübel: Kopec, p. of Staré Křečany
- Hengstererben: Hřebečná, p. of Abertamy
- Henne: Huníkov, p. of Česká Kamenice
- Henneberg: Borová, p. of Bolatice
- Hennersdorf:
  - Dolní Branná
  - Dubnice
  - Jindřichov (Bruntál District)
  - Jindřichov, p. of Lučany nad Nisou
- Heraletz:
  - Herálec (Havlíčkův Brod District)
  - Herálec (Žďár nad Sázavou District)
- Heraltitz: Heraltice
- Herautz: Heroltice, p. of Štíty
- Herbau: Hrbov, p. of Polná
- Herbitz: Hrbovice, p. of Chlumec (Ústí nad Labem District)
- Herbstwiese: Děčín VI-Letná
- Herdly: Hrdly, p. of Bohušovice nad Ohří
- Herlsdorf: Heroltovice, p. of Město Libavá
- Hermanitz: Heřmanice (Náchod District)
- Hermanmestec (Hermanmiestetz): Heřmanův Městec
- Hermannschlag: Kuří, p. of Benešov nad Černou
- Hermannsdorf: Heřmanov, p. of Teplá
- Hermannseifen: Rudník (Trutnov District)
- Hermannsgrün: Heřmanov, now Jindřichovice (Sokolov District)
- Hermannshütte: Heřmanova Huť
- Hermannstadt: Heřmanovice
- Hermannstädtel: Heřmanův Městec
- Hermannsthal: Jeřmanice
- Hermersdorf:
  - Heřmanov (Děčín District)
  - Kamenná Horka
- Hermitz: Heřmanice, p. of Starý Jičín
- Hermsdorf:
  - Heřmanice (Liberec District)
  - Heřmanice, p. of Žandov
  - Heřmanice v Podještědí, p. of Jablonné v Podještědí
  - Heřmaničky, p. of Česká Lípa
  - Heřmánkovice
  - Heřmánky
  - Heřmánky, now Libavá MTA*
- Herrlich: Hrdlovka, now Duchcov*
- Herrndorf: Kněževes (Rakovník District)
- Herrnsdorf: Heřmanice, p. of Králíky
- Herrnskretschen: Hřensko
- Herrnwalde: Panský, p. of Staré Křečany
- Herscheditz: Herstošice, p. of Bochov
- Herschichlau: Hřešihlavy, p. of Kladruby (Rokycany District)
- Herschmanitz: Heřmanice, p. of Ostrava
- Hertin: Rtyně v Podkrkonoší
- Hertine: Rtyně nad Bílinou
- Hertitz: Hertice, p. of Dolní Životice
- Herzogwald: Lesy, now Budišov nad Budišovkou
- Hesselsdorf: Hošťka
- Hetschigau: Hostíčkov, p. of Chodová Planá
- Hettau: Hetov, now Hrobčice*
- Heuhof: Sruby
- Heumahd: Senožaty
- Hielgersdorf: Severní, p. of Lobendava
- Hilbersdorf: Heroltice, p. of Jihlava
- Hilbeten: Hylváty, p. of Ústí nad Orlicí
- Hillau: Hýlov, p. of Klimkovice
- Hillemühl 1. Teil: Mlýny, p. of Kytlice
- Hillemühl 2. Teil: Hillův Mlýn, p. of Kytlice
- Hillersdorf: Holčovice
- Himmelreich: Nebesa, p. of Aš
- Himmlisch Ribnai: Nebeská Rybná, p. of Rokytnice v Orlických horách
- Hinkowitz: Hynkovice, now Strážov (Klatovy District)*
- Hinterglöckelberg: Zadní Zvonková, now Horní Planá
- Hinterhaid: Zadní Bor, now Boletice MTA*
- Hinterhäuser: Zadní Chalupy, now Hamry (Klatovy District)*
- Hinter Heuraffl: Zadní Výtoň, now Přední Výtoň
- Hinter Kotten: Zadní Chodov
- Hinterstift: Další Lhota, now Horní Planá
- Hinterstrietesch: Zadní Střítež
- Hinterwasser: Zářečí, now Březová nad Svitavou
- Hinter Zinnwald: Cínovec, p. of Dubí
- Hintring: Záhvozdí, p. of Želnava
- Hirschau: Hyršov, p. of Všeruby (Domažlice District)
- Hirschberg: Jelení, p. of Holčovice
- Hirschberg am See: Doksy
- Hirschbergen: Jelení, p. of Nová Pec
- Hirschenstand: Jelení, now Nové Hamry
- Hirschenstein: Jelenov, p. of Rejštejn
- Hirschdorf: Jelenice, p. of Vítkov
- Hirschfeld: Polná, p. of Hazlov
- Hlinay: Hliňany, p. of Řehlovice
- Hlinsko am Hostein: Hlinsko pod Hostýnem, p. of Bystřice pod Hostýnem
- Hlinsko: Hlinsko
- Hlintsch: Hlince
- Hlinz: Hlinsko, p. of Rudolfov
- Hlubocep: Prague-Hlubočepy
- Hlubosch: Hluboš
- Hluck: Hluk
- Hniemitz: Hněvnice
- Hnojnik (Hnoynik, Hnoinik): Hnojník
- Hobitschau: Hlubočany
- Hoch Aujest: Vysoký Újezd
- Hochberg:
  - Morašov, now Dolní Dvořiště*
  - Vyšehoří
- Hoch Chlumetz: Vysoký Chlumec
- Hochchwojno: Vysoké Chvojno
- Hochdobern: Dobrná
- Hochdorf:
  - Nahořany, p. of Větřní
  - Vysoká, p. of Jihlava
- Hochgarth: Obora, p. of Šindelová
- Hochkirchen: Kostelec, p. of Fulnek
- Hochlibin: Vysoká Libyně
- Hochmorschin: Mořina
- Hochofen: Vysoká Pec (Karlovy Vary District)
- Hochpetsch: Bečov
- Hochsemlowitz: Semněvice
- Hochstadt an der Iser: Vysoké nad Jizerou
- Hochstein: Hoštejn
- Hochtann: Vysoká (Havlíčkův Brod District)
- Hochwald:
  - Hukvaldy
  - Hvozd, now Boletice MTA*
- Hochwessely (Hoch Wessely): Vysoké Veselí
- Hodolein: Hodolany, p. of Olomouc
- Hodonin: Hodonín, p. of Zdíkov
- Hödlwald: Hejdlov, p. of Chvalšiny
- Hödnitz: Hodonice (Znojmo District)
- Höfen:
  - Dvorce (Jihlava District)
  - Dvory, p. of Loket
- Hoffnung: Naděje, p. of Cvikov
- Hof in Mähren: Dvorce (Bruntál District)
- Höflas: Dvorek, p. of Třebeň
- Höflein: Hevlín
- Hoflenz: Mlýnický Dvůr, p. of Červená Voda (Ústí nad Orlicí District)
- Höflitz:
  - Hvězdov, p. of Ralsko
  - Jedlka, p. of Malá Veleň
- Hohenbruck:
  - Bojiště, p. of Trutnov
  - Třebechovice pod Orebem
- Hohendorf:
  - Vysoká, p. of Dalovice (Karlovy Vary District)
  - Zádub, p. of Zádub-Závišín
- Hohendorf-Abaschin: Zádub-Závišín
- Hoheneck: Růžek, p. of Nová Ves (Liberec District)
- Hohenelbe: Vrchlabí
- Hohenfeld: Vysoké Pole
- Hohenfluß: Vysoký Potok, p. of Malá Morava
- Hohenfurth: Vyšší Brod
- Hohenjamny: Vysoké Jamné, p. of Lestkov (Tachov District)
- Hohenleipa: Vysoká Lípa, p. of Jetřichovice
- Hohenmauth: Vysoké Mýto
- Hohenofen: Vysoká Pec (Chomutov District)
- Hohenschlag: Vysoká, now Světlík*
- Hohenseibersdorf: Vysoké Žibřidovice, p. of Hanušovice
- Hohenstadt: Zábřeh
- Hohenstegen: Vysoké Lávky, now Prášily*
- Hohenstein: Unčín, p. of Krupka
- Hohenstollen: Vysoká Štola, p. of Nejdek
- Hohentann: Vysoká Jedle, p. of Místo
- Hohentrebetitsch: Vysoké Třebušice, p. of Krásný Dvůr
- Hohenwald: Vysoký, now Heřmanice (Liberec District)*
- Hohen Zetlisch: Vysoké Sedliště, p. of Planá
- Hohlen: Holany
- Hoihäuser: Seníky, now Františkovy Lázně
- Holaschowitz: Holašovice, p. of Jankov (České Budějovice District)
- Holitz:
  - Holice
  - Holice, p. of Olomouc
- Holkau: Holkov, p. of Velešín
- Höll: Peklo, p. of Stráž nad Ohří
- Höllegrund: Pekelský Důl, p. of Česká Kamenice
- Holleischen: Holýšov
- Holletitz:
  - Hodousice, p. of Nýrsko
  - Holedeč
- Holleschau: Holešov
- Hollezrieb: Holostřevy, p. of Bor (Tachov District)
- Hollin: Holyně, p. of Svojšín
- Höllmühl: Peklo, p. of Stružná
- Hollowing: Holubín, p. of Chodová Planá
- Hollubau: Holubov
- Hollunder: Chebzí, p. of Písečná (Jeseník District)
- Holstein: Holštejn
- Holoubkau (Holaubkau): Holoubkov
- Holubschen: Holubeč, p. of Hostouň (Domažlice District)
- Holzbach: Plavno, now Krásný Les (Karlovy Vary District)*
- Holzhof: Dřevíkov
- Holzschlag: Paseka, now Prášily*
- Hombok: Hlubočky
- Honau: Hanov, p. of Lestkov (Tachov District)
- Honetschlag: Hodňov, p. of Horní Planá
- Honnersdorf: Jindřichov, p. of Cheb
- Honnersgrün: Hanušov, p. of Ostrov (Karlovy Vary District)
- Honositz: Honezovice
- Hopfendorf: Chmelík
- Hopfengarten: Děčín XXV-Chmelnice
- Horatitz: Hořetice, p. of Žiželice (Louny District)
- Horaschdowitz (Horazdiowitz): Horažďovice
- Horauschen: Horoušany
- Horek: Horky, p. of Frýdštejn
- Horenowes: Hořiněves
- Horenz: Hořenec, p. of Libčeves
- Horepnik (Horschepnik): Hořepník
- Horikowitz: Hoříkovice, p. of Chotěšov (Plzeň-South District)
- Horitz (Horic): Hořice
- Höritz (im Böhmerwalde): Hořice na Šumavě
- Horschitzka: Hořičky
- Horka:
  - Dolejší Hůrky, p. of Postoloprty
  - (an der Iser): Horky nad Jizerou
- Horkau (Horka): Horka nad Moravou
- Horn:
  - (Hornberg): Hory
  - Hory, p. of Oloví
  - Hora, now Hradiště MTA*
- Horniemtsch: Horní Němčí
- Hornschlag: Hodoň, now Loučovice*
- Horosedl: Hořesedly
- Horschau: Horšov, p. of Horšovský Týn
- Horschelitz: Hořelice, now Rudná (Prague-West District)
- Horschepnik: Hořepník
- Hörschin: Hrzín, p. of Nový Kostel
- Horschitz: Hořice
- Horschowitz (Horowitz, Horzowitz):
  - Hořovice
  - Hořovičky
- Hörsin: Hrzín, p. of Nový Kostel
- Hortau: Děčín XXXV-Lesná
- Hörwitzel: Hořičky, now Boletice MTA*
- Hoschialkowitz: Hošťálkovice, p. of Ostrava
- Hoschlowitz: Hašlovice, p. of Větřní
- Hoschtitz-Heroltitz: Hoštice-Heroltice
- Hoslau:
  - Blata, p. of Nýrsko
  - Hvožďany (Domažlice District)
- Hosposin: Hospozín
- Hossau: Hosov, p. of Jihlava
- Hossen (Hosen): Hostínov, now Polná na Šumavě*
- Hossenreuth: Jenišov, now Horní Planá
- Hostaschowitz: Hostašovice
- Hostau: Hostouň (Domažlice District)
- Hostaun: Hostouň (Kladno District)
- Hostein: Hostýn
- Hosterlitz:
  - Hostěradice
  - Hostice, p. of Ruda nad Moravou
- Hosterschlag: Člunek
- Hostes: Hostkovice, p. of Dačice
- Hostialkow (Hostialkau): Hošťálková
- Hösting: Hostim
- Hostitz: Děčín XXIX-Hoštice nad Labem
- Hostiwitz: Hostivice
- Hostomitz:
  - Hostomice (Beroun District)
  - Hostomice (Teplice District)
- Hostowitz: Hostovice, p. of Pardubice
- Hottendorf: Hodkovice, now Jívka
- Hottowies: Hostovice, p. of Ústí nad Labem
- Hotzendorf: Hodslavice
- Hotzenplotz: Osoblaha
- Hrabin: Hrabyně
- Hrabstwie: Hrabství, p. of Skřipov
- Hradek: Hrádek (Klatovy District)
- Hradzen: Hradec (Plzeň-South District)
- Hraidisch: Hradiště nad Ohří, p. of Postoloprty
- Hranitz: Hranice, p. of Karviná
- Hriwitz: Hřivice
- Hrobschitz: Hrobčice
- Hrochow-Teinitz (Hrochowteinitz): Hrochův Týnec
- Hronow: Hronov
- Hrottowitz: Hrotovice
- Hrozna Lhotta: Hroznová Lhota
- Hruschau: Hrušov, p. of Ostrava
- Hruschowan:
  - Hrušovany (Chomutov District)
  - Hrušovany, p. of Polepy (Litoměřice District)
- Hubene: Hubenov, p. of Kaplice
- Hüblern: Houžná, p. of Lenora (Prachatice District)
- Hühnerwasser: Kuřívody, p. of Ralsko
- Hulken: Hluk
- Hullein: Hulín
- Hultschin: Hlučín
- Hulwaken: Hulváky, p. of Ostrava
- Hummel: Homole u Panny
- Hummeln: Homole (České Budějovice District)
- Humpoletz: Humpolec
- Humwald: Chlum, p. of Volary
- Hundorf: Hudcov, p. of Teplice
- Hundsnursch: Koryto, p. of Zbytiny
- Hundsruck: Hřbítek, now Loučovice*
- Hungertuch: Hladov
- Hunkowitz: Unkovice
- Huntir: Huntířov
- Hurka: Hůrka, p. of Jeseník nad Odrou
- Hurkau: Hůrky
- Hurkenthal: Hůrka, now Prášily*
- Hurschippen: Hořipná, now Rožmberk nad Vltavou*
- Hurschk: Hoštec, p. of Teplá
- Hurz: Zhořec, p. of Bezdružice
- Huschitz: Šumavské Hoštice
- Hussinetz: Husinec (Prachatice District)
- Hussowitz: Brno-Husovice
- Hustienowitz: Huštěnovice
- Hustopetsch (an der Betschwa): Hustopeče nad Bečvou
- Hut: Klobuky
- Hutberg: Hony, p. of Police nad Metují
- Hüttel: Chaloupky
- Hüttenberg: Pastviny, now Deštné v Orlických horách*
- Huttendorf: Zálesní Lhota, p. of Studenec (Semily District)
- Hüttenhof:
  - Huťský Dvůr, now Horní Planá*
  - Huťský Dvůr, now Vimperk*
- Hüttmesgrün: Vrch, now Krásný Les (Karlovy Vary District)*
- Hwiezdlitz: Hvězdlice
- Hwozdian: Hvožďany (Příbram District)

== I ==
- Igel: Jihlava (river)
- Iglau: Jihlava
- Illemnik: Jilemník, p. of Havlíčkův Brod
- Illeschowitz: Jilešovice, p. of Háj ve Slezsku
- Imlikau: Jimlíkov, p. of Nová Role
- Imling: Jimlín
- Indic: Jindice, p. of Rašovice (Kutná Hora District)
- Ingrowitz: Jimramov
- Innergefild: Horská Kvilda
- Innichen: Mchov, p. of Staré Sedliště
- Innozenzidorf: Lesné, p. of Jiřetín pod Jedlovou
- Irmsdorf: Jamartice, p. of Rýmařov
- Irresdorf: Lštín, now Polná na Šumavě*
- Irrgang: Bludná, p. of Pernink
- Irritz: Jiřice u Miroslavi
- Irschings: Jiřín, p. of Vyskytná nad Jihlavou
- Itschina: Jičina, p. of Starý Jičín

== J ==
- Jablon: Jablonná, p. of Chyše
- Jablonetz an der Iser: Jablonec nad Jizerou
- Jablunka: Jablůnka
- Jablunkau: Jablunkov
- Jäckelthal: Údolí, now Frýdlant
- Jagdhase: Kolná, p. of Brumovice (Opava District)
- Jägerdörfel: Myslivny, now Mařenice
- Jägerndorf: Krnov
- Jägersdorf: Lada, p. of Česká Lípa
- Jaispitz: Jevišovice
- Jaktar: Jaktař, p. of Opava
- Jakubschowitz: Jakubčovice, p. of Hradec nad Moravicí
- Jalub: Jalubí
- Jamles: Jamné, p. of Boršov nad Vltavou
- Jamnei an der Adler: Jamné nad Orlicí
- Jamnitz:
  - Jamnice, p. of Stěbořice
  - Jemnice
- Janauschendorf: Janoušov
- Jandles: Mošna, now Zbytiny
- Janegg: Jeníkov (Teplice District)
- Janessen: Jenišov
- Jankau: Jankov (Benešov District)
- Janketschlag (Jangetschlag): Jankov, now Hořice na Šumavě*
- Jankowitz: Jankovice, p. of Letohrad
- Janowitz:
  - Janovice
  - Janovice, p. of Dlouhá Ves (Klatovy District)
  - Janovice, p. of Pelhřimov
  - Janovice, p. of Polná
  - Janovice, p. of Rýmařov
  - Janovice, p. of Starý Jičín
  - (an der Angel): Janovice nad Úhlavou
  - Janovičky, p. of Zámrsk
- Jansdorf: Janov (Svitavy District)
- Jareschau (an der Naser): Jarošov nad Nežárkou
- Jarkowitz: Jarkovice, p. of Velhartice
- Jarmeritz (Jaromeritz): Jaroměřice nad Rokytnou
- Jarmirn: Jaroměř, p. of Malonty
- Jarohnowitz: Jarohněvice
- Jaromieritz: Jaroměřice
- Jaronin: Jaronín, p. of Brloh (Český Krumlov District)
- Jasena: Jasenná (Náchod District)
- Jassenitz: Jasenice, p. of Lešná
- Jassenka: Horní Jasenka, p. of Vsetín
- Jastersdorf: Jestřabí, p. of Fulnek
- Jauernig: Javorník (Jeseník District)
- Jauernig Dorf: Ves Javorník, now Javorník (Jeseník District)
- Jawornitz: Javornice
- Jechnitz: Jesenice (Rakovník District)
- Jedownitz: Jedovnice
- Jeedl: Jedlí
- Jelemka: Jelemek, p. of Nebahovy
- Jenewelt: Onen Svět, p. of Čachrov
- Jenschowitz: Jenišovice (Jablonec nad Nisou District)
- Jentsch: Jeneč, p. of Brťov-Jeneč
- Jentschitz: Jenčice
- Jerschmanitz: Jeřmanice
- Jermer: Jaroměř
- Jesau: Ježená
- Jeschken: Ještěd (mountain)
- Jeschkowitz: Jezdkovice
- Jeseney (Jesenei): Jesenný
- Jessenetz: Jesenec
- Jessenitz: Jesenice (Prague-West District)
- Jestrabi: Jestřabí v Krkonoších
- Jetietitz: Jetětice
- Jetschan: Děčany
- Jeschin: Ješín, p. of Velvary
- Jettenitz:
  - Dětenice
  - Řetenice, p. of Nicov
- Jetzlau: Jeclov, p. of Velký Beranov
- Jewan: Jevany
- Jibka: Jívka
- Jicinowes: Jičíněves
- Jilau: Jílové u Držkova
- Jinetz: Jince
- Jirkau: Jirkov, p. of Železný Brod
- Jistebnitz: Jistebnice
- Jistey (Gistej): Jistebsko, p. of Pěnčín (Jablonec nad Nisou District)
- Jitschin: Jičín
- Jitzkowitz: Jickovice
- Joachimsdorf: Jáchymov, p. of Brniště
- Joachimsthal: Jáchymov
- Jogsdorf: Jakubčovice nad Odrou
- Johanidorf: Johanka, p. of Kamenice nad Lipou
- Johannaburg: Johanka, now Stará Červená Voda*
- Johannesberg:
  - Janov nad Nisou
  - Janovičky, p. of Heřmánkovice
  - Janovka, p. of Velký Šenov
  - Svatý Jan nad Malší
- Johannesdorf:
  - Janov, p. of Kočov
  - Janov, p. of Nový Bor
  - Janova Ves, p. of Pohorská Ves
- Johannesfeld: Zadky, p. of Neplachovice
- Johannesgunst: Janovice, p. of Rudník (Trutnov District)
- Johanneskirchl: Kosteliště, p. of Všeruby (Domažlice District)
- Johannesthal:
  - Janov (Bruntál District)
  - Janské Údolí, p. of Brloh (Český Krumlov District)
  - Liberec IX-Janův Důl
- Johannisbad: Janské Lázně
- Johnsbach (Jonsbach): Janská
- Johnsdorf:
  - Habrovice, p. of Ústí nad Labem
  - Janov, p. of Litvínov
  - Janovice, now Jívka
  - Janovice v Podještědí
  - Janovice, p. of Kravaře
- Jokelsdorf (Jockelsdorf):
  - Jakubovice
  - Jakubovice, p. of Dolní Čermná
- Jokes: Jakubov, p. of Vojkovice (Karlovy Vary District)
- Jonsdorf: Janov (Děčín District)
- Josefihütte: Josefova Huť, now Planá
- Josefsburg: Josefovice, p. of Hrabyně
- Josefschlag: Žižkovo Předměstí, now České Velenice
- Josefsdorf:
  - Josefov (Hodonín District)
  - Josefov (Sokolov District)
  - Josefov, p. of Rožná
  - Josefovice, p. of Klimkovice
  - Svobodná Ves, p. of Horka I
- Josefstadt:
  - Josefov, p. of Jaroměř
  - Prague-Josefov
- Josefsthal:
  - Josefodol, p. of Světlá nad Sázavou
  - Josefův Důl (Jablonec nad Nisou District)
- Josefswille: Mlatce, p. of Františkov nad Ploučnicí
- Josephsthal: Josefův Důl (Mladá Boleslav District)
- Joslowitz: Jaroslavice
- Judendorf:
  - Přítkov, p. of Proboštov
  - Židněves
- Julienau: Julín, p. of Úštěk
- Julienheim (Julienhain): Hranice (České Budějovice District)
- Juliusthal: Juliovka, p. of Krompach
- Jungbuch: Mladé Buky
- Jungbunzlau: Mladá Boleslav
- Jungfern Berschan: Panenské Břežany
- Jungferndorf:
  - Kobylá nad Vidnavkou
  - Panenská, now Petrovice (Ústí nad Labem District)
- Jungfernteinitz: Panenský Týnec
- Jung Smoliwetz: Mladý Smolivec
- Jung Woschitz: Mladá Vožice
- Juratin: Kurojedy, p. of Bor (Tachov District)
- Jurau: Jírov, now Hradiště MTA*

== K ==
- Kaaden: Kadaň
- Kabischowitz: Chabičovice, p. of Mirkovice
- Kahau: Kahov, p. of Prachatice
- Kahudowa: Kohoutov, p. of Bezdružice
- Kahn über Bodenbach: Velké Chvojno
- Kahr: Úžlabí, p. of Habartov
- Kaile: Kyje
- Kailowitz: Kajlovec, p. of Hradec nad Moravicí
- Kainratsdorf: Kondratice, now Hořice na Šumavě*
- Kainretschlag: Konratice, p. of Horní Stropnice
- Kaiserswalde: Císařský, p. of Šluknov
- Kaitz: Kyjice, now Vrskmaň*
- Kaladey (Kaladei): Koloděje nad Lužnicí, p. of Týn nad Vltavou
- Kalenitz: Chválenice
- Kalkpodol: Vápenný Podol
- Kallendorf: Chvalovice (Znojmo District)
- Kallenitz: Kalenice
- Kallich: Kalek
- Kalischt: Kaliště (Pelhřimov District)
- Kalmswiese: Děčín XVII-Jalůvčí
- Kalsching: Chvalšiny
- Kaltenbach: Nové Hutě
- Kaltenbach: Studený, p. of Kunratice (Děčín District)
- Kaltenbirken: Zahořánky, p. of Přídolí
- Kaltenbrunn:
  - Studánky, p. of Všeruby (Domažlice District)
  - Studánky, p. of Vyšší Brod
- Kaltenhof: Oblanov, p. of Trutnov
- Kaltenlautsch: Studená Loučka, p. of Mohelnice
- Kaltseifen: Studený Zejf, p. of Písečná (Jeseník District)
- Kaltwasser: Studená Voda, p. of Božanov
- Kalwitz: Kalovice, p. of Úštěk
- Kamaik:
  - Kamýk (Litoměřice District)
  - Kamýk nad Vltavou
- Kamberg: Kamberk
- Kamen: Kámen (Pelhřimov District)
- Kamenitschek (Kamenicek): Kameničky
- Kamenik: Kamýk, p. of Švihov (Klatovy District)
- Kameral Ellgoth: Komorní Lhotka
- Kamiegl: Kamýk, p. of Bezdružice
- Kamitz: Kamenka, p. of Odry
- Kammer: Komora, p. of Holčovice
- Kammerdorf: Lužná
- Kammersgrün: Lužec, p. of Nejdek
- Kamenitz:
  - Kamenice (Jihlava District)
  - Kamenice (Prague-East District)
  - (an der Linde): Kamenice nad Lipou
  - Kamenná (Třebíč District)
  - Trhová Kamenice
- Kamentz: Kamenec, p. of Holasovice
- Kamnitzleiten: Kamenická Stráň, p. of Růžová
- Kamnitz-Neudörfel: Kamenická Nová Víska, p. of Česká Kamenice
- Kanitz: Dolní Kounice
- Kanowsko: Kanovsko, p. of Vlkoš (Přerov District)
- Kapellen: Kapličky, now Loučovice*
- Kapellenhäuser: Kaplice, p. of Lenora (Prachatice District)
- Kapellner Waldhäuser: Kaplické Chalupy, now Přední Výtoň*
- Kaplitz: Kaplice
- Kapsch: Skapce
- Karbitz: Chabařovice
- Kardasch Retschitz: Kardašova Řečice
- Kares: Kařez
- Karlbachhütte: Karlova Huť, p. of Bělá nad Radbuzou
- Karlowitz: Velké Karlovice
- Karlsbad (Carlsbad): Karlovy Vary
- Karlsberg:
  - Karlov, p. of Josefův Důl (Jablonec nad Nisou District)
  - Karlovec, p. of Bruntál
- Karlsbrunn: Karle (Svitavy District)
- Karlsburg: Kašperk
- Karlsdorf:
  - Karlov pod Pradědem, p. of Malá Morávka
  - Karlov, p. of Bohušov
- Karlslau: Karlovec, p. of Opava
- Karlstein: Karlštejn (Beroun District)
- Karlsthal:
  - Karlovice (Bruntál District)
  - Karlovka, p. of Velká Bukovina
- Karlswald: Liberec XXXV-Karlov pod Ještědem
- Karolinsfeld: Liberec XVIII-Karlinky
- Karolinenthal: Prague-Karlín
- Karolinsthal (Carolinsthal, Karolinstal): Karlín, p. of Dolní Poustevna
- Karolinthal: Peklo, now Raspenava
- Kartaus (Karthaus): Čertousy, now Prague 20
- Karthaus-Walditz: Valdice
- Kartitz: Choratice, p. of Malšovice
- Kartouze: Královo Pole
- Karwin: Karviná
- Kaschitz: Kaštice, p. of Podbořany
- Kaschkowitz: Kaškovice, p. of Frýdštejn
- Kassejowitz: Kasejovice
- Kastlern: Hradový, now Vyšší Brod
- Katharein: Kateřinky, p. of Opava
- Katharinaberg:
  - Hora Svaté Kateřiny
  - Kateřinov, now Polná
- Katharinadorf: Kateřina, p. of Skalná
- Katharinberg: Liberec XVII-Kateřinky
- Katharinenthal: Kateřina, p. of Dolní Podluží
- Katowitz: Katovice
- Kattendorf: Kateřinice (Nový Jičín District)
- Katusitz: Katusice
- Katzendorf: Starojická Lhota, p. of Starý Jičín
- Katzengrün: Kaceřov (Sokolov District)
- Katzow: Kácov
- Kaunitz: Kounice
- Kaunowa: Kounov
- Kaurzim (Kaurim): Kouřim
- Kauth: Kout na Šumavě
- Kauthen: Kouty, p. of Kravaře
- Kautz: Chouč, p. of Hrobčice
- Kawarn: Koberno, p. of Slezské Rudoltice
- Kaznau (Kasenau, Kasnau): Kaznějov
- Keilberg: Klínovec (mountain)
- Keltsch: Kelč
- Keltschan: Kelčany
- Ketten: Chotyně
- Kellersdorf: Šimanov
- Kerndorf: Jadrná, now Orlické Záhoří
- Kernin: Krnín, p. of Chlumec (Český Krumlov District)
- Kettowitz: Chotěbudice, p. of Krásný Dvůr
- Ketzelsdorf:
  - Koclířov
  - Kocléřov, p. of Vítězná
- Khaa: Kyjov, p. of Krásná Lípa
- Khan: Chanov, p. of Obrnice
- Kiefergratschen: Borová Krčma, now Vendolí
- Kienberg: Loučovice
- Kienhaid: Načetín I, now Kalek*
- Kienwald: Borovnice (Rychnov nad Kněžnou District)
- Kieselhof: Čkyně
- Kiesenreuth: Kříženec, p. of Planá
- Killitz (Kilitz): Chylice, p. of Útvina
- Kinitz: Knínice (Jihlava District)
- Kinitz-Tettau: Vchynice-Tetov, p. of Srní
- Kinsberg: Hrozňatov, p. of Cheb
- Kirchberg:
  - Kámen (Pelhřimov District)
  - Kostelní, p. of Kraslice
- Kirchenbirk: Kostelní Bříza, p. of Březová (Sokolov District)
- Kirchsassen: Rudná (Prague-West District)
- Kirchschlag: Světlík
- Kiritein: Křtiny
- Kirsch: Krsy
- Kirschbaum: Třešňovice, now Rožmitál na Šumavě*
- Kirwein: Skrbeň
- Kitlitzdorf: Kytlice, now Citice*
- Kladek: Kladky
- Kittlitz (Kittelwitz): Kytlice
- Kladen:
  - Kladné, p. of Kájov
  - Kladno
- Kladerlas: Kladruby, p. of Teplá
- Kladrau: Kladruby (Tachov District)
- Kladrub:
  - Kladruby (Benešov District)
  - (an der Elbe): Kladruby nad Labem
- Klantendorf: Kujavy
- Klapay (Klappay): Klapý
- Klattau: Klatovy
- Klattau Prager Vorstadt: Klatovy II
- Klattau Reichsvorstadt: Klatovy III
- Klattau Stadt: Klatovy I
- Klattau Vorstadt: Klatovy V
- Klattau Wiener Vorstadt: Klatovy IV
- Klebsch: Chlebičov
- Klein Aicha (Kleinaicha): Dubice
- Klein Augezd:
  - Malý Újezd
  - Újezdeček
- Klein Aupa (Kleinaupa): Malá Úpa
- Klein Aurim: Malý Uhřínov, now Liberk
- Klein Barchow: Barchůvek, p. of Měník
- Klein Bieschitz: Zběšičky
- Klein Blatzen: Blatečky, p. of Blatce
- Klein Bocken (Klein Boken): Malá Bukovina, p. of Velká Bukovina
- Klein Bor (Kleinheid): Malý Bor
- Klein Bösig: Bezdědice, p. of Bělá pod Bezdězem
- Kleinbrand: Žďárky
- Klein Borowitz: Borovnička
- Klein Bressel: Vraclávek, p. of Hošťálkovy
- Klein Bubna: Bubny, now Prague-Holešovice
- Klein Bukovina: Malá Bukovina, p. of Chvalkovice (Náchod District)
- Klein Cejtitz: Čejetičky, p. of Mladá Boleslav
- Klein Cekau: Čakovec, p. of Čakov (České Budějovice District)
- Klein Chischka: Chyšky
- Klein Chotieschau: Chotěšovičky, p. of Pňovany
- Klein Tschernosek (Klein Czernosek): Malé Žernoseky
- Klein Darkowitz: Darkovičky, p. of Hlučín
- Klein Deschau: Malý Dešov, now Dešov
- Kleindrossen: Malá Strašeň, now Světlík*
- Klein Eicha: Dubice, p. of Česká Lípa
- Klein Ellgoth: Dolní Lhota (Ostrava-City District)
- Klein Fürwitz: Vrbička, p. of Vroutek
- Klein Gallein: Pusté Skaliny, p. of Benešov nad Černou
- Klein Glockersdorf: Klokočůvek, p. of Odry
- Klein Gorschin: Malý Horšín, now Rybník (Domažlice District)*
- Klein Grabau: Hrabůvka, p. of Ostrava
- Klein Grillowitz: Křídlůvky
- Klein Gropitzreith: Malý Rapotín, p. of Tachov
- Kleingrün: Drnovec, p. of Cvikov
- Kleingrün: Malý Hrzín, p. of Stráž nad Ohří
- Kleinhan: Malý Háj, p. of Hora Svaté Kateřiny
- Klein Heilendorf: Postřelmůvek
- Klein Heinrichschlag: Malý Jindřichov, now Benešov nad Černou*
- Klein Hermigsdorf: Helvíkov, p. of Anenská Studánka
- Klein Hermsdorf: Heřmánky
- Klein Herrlitz: Malé Heraltice, p. of Velké Heraltice
- Klein Hitschitz: Malé Hydčice, p. of Malý Bor
- Klein Hluschitz: Hlušičky, p. of Hlušice
- Klein Holetitz: Holedeček, p. of Holedeč
- Kleinhorka: Malá Horka, p. of Železný Brod
- Klein Hoschütz: Malé Hoštice, p. of Opava
- Klein Hrabowa: Hrabůvka, p. of Ostrava
- Klein Hubina: Malý Hubenov, now Želízy
- Klein Iser: Jizerka, p. of Kořenov
- Klein Kahn: Malé Chvojno, p. of Velké Chvojno
- Klein Karlowitz: Malé Karlovice, p. of Velké Karlovice
- Klein Kaudern: Chuderovec, p. of Chuderov
- Klein Kinitz: Brno-Kníničky
- Klein Körbitz: Malé Krhovice, p. of Chbany
- Kleinkositz: Kosičky
- Klein Krosse: Malá Kraš, now Velká Kraš
- Klein Kuchel: Malá Chuchle, now Prague-Velká Chuchle
- Klein Kunzendorf: Kunčičky, p. of Ostrava
- Kleinlaschitz: Lažišťka, p. of Nebahovy
- Klein Lhota: Hranice II-Lhotka
- Klein Lomnitz: Lomnička (Brno-Country District)
- Kleinlubigau (Klein Lubigau): Malý Hlavákov, p. of Verušičky
- Klein Meierhöfen: Malé Dvorce, p. of Přimda
- Klein Mallowa: Malý Malahov, p. of Puclice
- Kleinmergthal: Mařeničky, p. of Mařenice
- Klein Mohrau:
  - Malá Morava
  - Malá Morávka
- Klein Nedanitz: Nedaničky, p. of Měčín
- Klein Nepodritz: Malé Nepodřice, p. of Dobev
- Klein Neustift: Cerekvička, p. of Cerekvička-Rosice
- Klein Niemtschitz: Němčičky (Břeclav District)
- Kleinnixdorf: Mikulášovičky, p. of Mikulášovice
- Klein Olbersdorf: Albrechtičky
- Klein Olkowitz: Oleksovičky, p. of Slup
- Klein Otschehau: Očihovec, p. of Očihov
- Klein Pantschen: Malý Pěčín, p. of Dačice
- Klein Petersdorf: Dolní Vražné, now Vražné
- Klein Peterswald: Petřvaldík, p. of Petřvald (Nový Jičín District)
- Klein Petrowitz:
  - Petrovičky
  - Petrovičky, p. of Týniště nad Orlicí
- Klein Poidl: Podoličko, now Mohelnice
- Klein Popowitz: Modletice
- Klein Poreschin: Pořešinec, p. of Kaplice
- Klein Prennet: Spáleneček, p. of Česká Kubice
- Kleinpriesen: Malé Březno (Most District)
- Klein Priesen: Malé Březno (Ústí nad Labem District)
- Klein Prossenitz: Malé Prosenice, now Prosenice
- Klein Rammerschlag: Malý Ratmírov, p. of Blažejov
- Klein Ritte: Řetůvka
- Klein Schinian (Klein Zinian): Žíňánky, p. of Soběhrdy
- Klein Schönau: Malý Šenov, p. of Velký Šenov
- Klein Schönhof: Krásný Dvoreček, p. of Rokle
- Klein Schokau: Malý Šachov, p. of Starý Šachov
- Klein Schüttüber: Malá Šitbor, p. of Milíkov (Cheb District)
- Klein Schwadowitz: Malé Svatoňovice
- Klein Semlowitz: Zámělíč, p. of Poběžovice
- Klein Senitz: Senička
- Klein Sichdichfür: Malá Hleďsebe, p. of Velká Hleďsebe
- Kleinskal: Malá Skála
- Klein Sliwno: Mečeříž
- Klein Spinelsdorf: Malá Lesná, now Hradiště MTA*
- Klein Stiebnitz: Zdobnička, now Zdobnice
- Klein Stohl: Malá Štáhle
- Klein Studnitz: Studénky, p. of Puklice
- Klein Tajax: Dyjákovičky
- Klein Teinitz: Týneček, p. of Olomouc
- Klein Tesswitz: Dobšice
- Kleinthal: Údolíčko, p. of Perštejn
- Klein Trestny: Malé Tresné, p. of Rovečné
- Kleintschekau: Čakovec
- Klein Tscherma: Malá Čermná, p. of Čermná nad Orlicí
- Klein Tschernitz: Malá Černoc, p. of Blšany
- Klein Umlowitz: Omlenička, p. of Omlenice
- Klein Uretschlag: Dvořetín, now Světlík*
- Klein Wanau: Vanůvek
- Klein Werscheditz: Verušičky
- Klein Wöhlen (Klein Wehlen): Malá Veleň
- Klein Wonetitz: Bonětičky, p. of Stráž (Tachov District)
- Klein Zdikau: Branišov
- Klein Zdikau: Zdíkovec, p. of Zdíkov
- Klein Ziegenruck: Malý Kozí Hřbet, p. of Rejštejn
- Klein Zmietsch: Smědeček, p. of Ktiš
- Kleische: Klíše, p. of Ústí nad Labem
- Klemensdorf:
  - Klimentov, p. of Velká Hleďsebe
  - Lasvice, p. of Zákupy
- Klenowitz:
  - Klenovice
  - Klenovice, p. of Mičovice
  - Klenovice, p. of Milešov
  - Klenovice, p. of Všeruby (Plzeň-North District)
  - Klenovice na Hané
- Klentnitz: Klentnice
- Klentsch: Klenčí pod Čerchovem
- Kleppel: Klepáčov, p. of Sobotín
- Kleppen: Klepná, now Pohorská Ves*
- Kletten: Kletné, p. of Suchdol nad Odrou
- Klingen: Hlínová, now Odrava
- Klingenberg: Zvíkov (Český Krumlov District)
- Klinghart: Křižovatka
- Klistau: Chlistov
- Klitschney: Klíčnov, p. of Pulečný
- Klobauk (Klobouk): Klobouky u Brna
- Kloben: Hlavno, p. of Citice
- Klobuk: Klobuky
- Klomin: Chlumín
- Kloppe: Klopina
- Kloster:
  - Klášter, p. of Nová Bystřice
  - (an der Iser): Klášter Hradiště nad Jizerou
- Klösterle:
  - Klášterec, p. of Olšany (Šumperk District)
  - Klášterec, p. of Vimperk
  - (an der Eger): Klášterec nad Ohří
  - Klášterec nad Orlicí
- Klosterdorf: Černé Budy
- Klostergrab: Hrob
- Klostermühle: Klášterský Mlýn, p. of Rejštejn
- Kloster Radisch: Klášterní Hradisko, p. of Olomouc
- Klum:
  - Chlum (Česká Lípa District)
  - Chlum, p. of Pšov
- Klumtschan: Petrohrad
- Klutschenitz: Klučenice
- Klutschkau: Kluček, p. of Liběšice (Louny District)
- Knezic (Kniezitz): Kněžice (Chrudim District)
- Kniebitschken: Pňovičky, p. of Ohníč
- Knieschitz: Kněžice (Jihlava District)
- Knihnitz: Knínice (Blansko District)
- Kninitz: Knínice, p. of Libouchec
- Knöba: Hněvín
- Knönitz: Knínice, p. of Žlutice
- Knöschitz: Kněžice, p. of Podbořany
- Kobels (Kobilly, Kobylli): Kobylí
- Koberwald: Koberovy
- Köberwitz: Kobeřice
- Kobilla (Kobyla): Kobylé, p. of Pšov
- Köblau: Keblov
- Koblau: Koblov, p. of Ostrava
- Kochendorf: Kochánov
- Kocourow: Kocourov
- Kodetschlag: Jenín, p. of Dolní Dvořiště
- Köhlersdorf: Uhlířov
- Kohlfelden: Prague-Hlubočepy
- Kohlgruben: Jámy
- Kohlhau (Kohlau): Kolová
- Kohlheim: Uhliště, p. of Chudenín
- Kohlige: Uhelná, p. of Hrádek nad Nisou
- Kohling: Milíře, now Šindelová*
- Kohljanowitz: Uhlířské Janovice
- Kohl Pribrams (Kohlpribram): Uhelná Příbram
- Kohlsdorf: Kolnovice, p. of Mikulovice (Jeseník District)
- Kohlstatt (Kohlstadt): Milíře, p. of Rádlo
- Kohlstätten: Šnory, now Pelechy*
- Köhmet: Komňátka, p. of Bohdíkov
- Kojatek: Kojátky
- Kojetein:
  - Kojetín (Havlíčkův Brod District)
  - Kojetín (Přerov District)
  - Kojetín, p. of Nový Jičín
- Kojetitz:
  - Kojetice (Mělník District)
  - Kojetice (Třebíč District)
  - Kojetice, p. of Ústí nad Labem
  - Kojetín, p. of Radonice (Chomutov District)
- Kokaschitz: Kokašice
- Koken: Kohoutov
- Kokor: Kokory
- Kokorow:
  - Kokořov, p. of Všeruby (Plzeň-North District)
  - Kokořov, p. of Žinkovy
- Koleschowitz: Kolešovice
- Koletsch: Koleč
- Kolin (Köln an der Elbe): Kolín
- Kolinetz (Kollinetz): Kolinec
- Kollautschen: Koloveč
- Köllein: Cholina
- Kolleschau: Kolešov, p. of Pšov
- Kolleschau: Kolšov
- Kolleschowitz (Koleschowitz): Kolešovice
- Köllne: Včelná pod Boubínem, p. of Buk (Prachatice District)
- Kolmberg: Plešivec, now Volary
- Kolosoruk (Kollosoruk): Korozluky
- Kolmen: Děčín XXXIV-Chlum
- Komarschitz: Komařice
- Komein: Brno-Komín
- Komeise: Chomýž, now Krnov
- Kommern: Komořany, p. of Most
- Komoran: Prague 12-Komořany
- Komorau:
  - Komárov (Beroun District)
  - Komárov, p. of Opava
- Komotau:
  - Chomoutov, p. of Olomouc
  - Chomutov
- Konakow: Koňákov, p. of Český Těšín
- Konarowitz: Konárovice
- Konetzchlum: Konecchlumí
- Königgrätz: Hradec Králové
- Königinhof an der Elbe: Dvůr Králové nad Labem
- Königliche Weinberge: Prague-Vinohrady
- Königreich: Hájemství, p. of Vítězná
- Königsaal: Prague-Zbraslav
- Königsberg:
  - Klimkovice
  - (an der Eger): Kynšperk nad Ohří
- Königseck: Kunžak
- Königsfeld:
  - Anenská Studánka
  - Brno-Královo Pole
- Königsfeld Waschan: Královopolské Vážany, p. of Rousínov
- Königsgrund: Králec, p. of Dolní Studénky
- Königshain: Královka, p. of Šluknov
- Königshan (Königshann): Královec
- Königshof: Králův Dvůr
- Königstadtl: Městec Králové
- Königswald: Libouchec
- Königswalde: Království, p. of Šluknov
- Königswart: Lázně Kynžvart
- Königswerth: Královské Poříčí
- Konin: Konín, p. of Velhartice
- Konitz: Konice
- Konkolna: Koukolná, p. of Dětmarovice
- Konojed: Konojedy, p. of Úštěk
- Konopischt: Konopiště
- Konraditz:
  - Kundratice
  - Kundratice, p. of Přimda
- Konrads: Klášter
- Konradsgrün: Salajna, p. of Dolní Žandov
- Konstadt: Mlýnská, p. of Kraslice
- Konstantinsbad: Konstantinovy Lázně
- Kopain:
  - Kopanina, p. of Pulečný
  - Kopaniny, p. of Chvalkovice (Náchod District)
- Köppeln: Keply, p. of Hartmanice (Klatovy District)
- Kopetzen: Kopec, p. of Prostiboř
- Kopidlno (Kopidlelau): Kopidlno
- Kopitz (Kopist): Kopisty, now Most
- Koppertsch: Koporeč, p. of Lišnice
- Körbern: Prague-Košíře
- Körbitz: Krbice, now Spořice*
- Koritschan: Koryčany
- Korkushütten: Korkusova Huť, p. of Vimperk
- Kornau: Obilná, p. of Odrava
- Kornhaus: Mšec
- Kornitz: Chornice
- Kornsalz: Prostřední Krušec, p. of Hartmanice (Klatovy District)
- Koschatka: Košatka, p. of Stará Ves nad Ondřejnicí
- Koschendorf: Košetice, p. of Velké Heraltice
- Koschetitz (Koschen): Košetice
- Koschowitz: Kojšovice, p. of Toužim
- Kosel: Kozly (Česká Lípa District)
- Koslau:
  - Kozlov (Jihlava District)
  - (Kozlau): Kozlov (Olomouc District)
- Koslike: Kozlíky, p. of Rtyně nad Bílinou
- Kosmatschow (Kosmacow): Kosmáčov, p. of Klatovy
- Kosmanos: Kosmonosy
- Kosmütz: Kozmice (Opava District)
- Kosolup: Horní Kozolupy
- Kosow: Kozov, p. of Bouzov
- Kosse: Kosov (Šumperk District)
- Kosslau (Koslau):
  - Kozlov (Žďár nad Sázavou District)
  - Kozlov, p. of Bochov
- Kostel (Kostl): Podivín
- Kösteldorf: Rájec, p. of Černava
- Kosteletz
  - Červený Kostelec
  - (an der Moldau): Kostelec nad Vltavou
  - (bei Holleschau): Kostelec u Holešova
  - (in der Hanna): Kostelec na Hané
- Kostelzen: Kostelec (Tachov District)
- Kosten: Košťany
- Kosten: Koštov, p. of Trmice
- Kostenblatt: Kostomlaty pod Milešovkou
- Kosterschan: Kostrčany, p. of Valeč (Karlovy Vary District)
- Kostomlat unterm Georgsberg: Kostomlaty pod Řípem
- Kotieschau (Kotieschow): Chotěšov, p. of Velhartice
- Kotigau: Chotíkov, p. of Kynšperk nad Ohří
- Kötschwitz: Chocovice, p. of Třebeň
- Kottiken: Chotíkov
- Köttnitz: Skotnice
- Kottomirsch: Chotiměř
- Kottowitz: Kotovice
- Kottwitz: Chotěvice
- Kotzehrad (Kotzerad, Kozehrad): Chocerady
- Kotzendorf: Moravskoslezský Kočov
- Kotzianau: Kociánov, p. of Loučná nad Desnou
- Kotzobendz: Chotěbuz
- Kotzoura: Kocourov
- Kowarschow: Kovářov
- Kowarschen: Kovářov, p. of Čichalov
- Kozlan (Koschlan): Kožlany
- Kozuschan: Kožušany, p. of Kožušany-Tážaly
- Kradrob: Kladruby (Teplice District)
- Krainhof: Dvorečky, p. of Kynšperk nad Ohří
- Kralik: Králíky (Hradec Králové District)
- Kralitz:
  - (in der Hanna): Kralice na Hané
  - Kralice nad Oslavou
- Krallen: Kralovice, p. of Nebahovy
- Kralowitz: Kralovice
- Kralup an der Moldau: Kralupy nad Vltavou
- Kramitz: Chrámce, p. of Skršín
- Krasch: Krašov, p. of Bezvěrov
- Kraschowitz: Krašovice
- Krasensko: Krásensko
- Krasna: Krásno nad Bečvou, p. of Valašské Meziříčí
- Krasnahora: Krásná Hora
- Krassetin: Krasetín, p. of Holubov
- Krassonitz: Krasonice
- Kratenau: Kratonohy
- Kratzau: Chrastava
- Kratzdorf: Chrastice, p. of Staré Město (Šumperk District)
- Krawska: Kravsko
- Kreibitz: Chřibská
- Kreibitz-Neudörfel: Rybniště
- Krelowitz: Křelovice (Pelhřimov District)
- Kremetschau: Křemačov, p. of Mohelnice
- Krems: Křemže
- Kremsier: Kroměříž
- Kremusch (Krzemusch): Křemýž, p. of Ohníč
- Krenau: Křenov, p. of Kájov
- Kreppenschläger: Křeplice, now Prachatice
- Kresane: Křesanov, p. of Vimperk
- Kreschtowitz: Chřešťovice, p. of Albrechtice nad Vltavou
- Kretscham: Krčma, now Domašín
- Kreutzberg: Křížová, p. of Hošťálkovy
- Kreuz-Kosteletz: Kostelec u Křížků
- Kreuzberg:
  - Krucemburk
  - Kružberk
- Kreuzendorf: Holasovice
- Kreuzenstein: Podhoří, p. of Cheb
- Kreuzweg: Křížatky, p. of Litvínov
- Kriebaum: Vitěšovice, now Boletice MTA*
- Kriebaumkollern: Vitěšovičtí Uhlíři, now Boletice MTA*
- Krieblitz: Kryblice, p. of Trutnov
- Kriegern: Kryry
- Kriegsdorf: Valšov
- Kriesdorf: Křižany
- Kriesenitz (Krisenitz): Kříženec, p. of Hartmanice (Klatovy District)
- Krinsdorf:
  - Křenov, p. of Bernartice (Trutnov District)
  - Křižanov, p. of Hrob
- Krima: Křimov
- Krimitz (Krzimitz): Křimice, p. of Plzeň
- Krinetz: Křinec
- Krippau: Skřipová, p. of Vrbice (Karlovy Vary District)
- Krips: Křivce, p. of Bezdružice
- Krisch (Krzisch): Kříše, p. of Břasy
- Krischek: Křížky, p. of Malá Skála
- Krischwitz: Děčín XXXI-Křešice
- Krisowitz: Křížovice
- Kritschen: Podolí (Brno-Country District)
- Krisaudow (Kschiwsoudow): Křivsoudov
- Krizanau (Krzizanau, Krischanau): Křižanov (Žďár nad Sázavou District)
- Krizinkau (Krischinkow): Křižínkov
- Krizlitz: Křížlice, p. of Jestřabí v Krkonoších
- Krochwitz: Děčín VII-Chrochvice
- Krokersdorf: Krakořice, p. of Šternberk
- Krombach: Krompach
- Kröna: Křenová, now Brno-střed
- Krönau: Křelov, p. of Křelov-Břuchotín
- Krondorf: Korunní, p. of Stráž nad Ohří
- Kronland: Lanškroun
- Kronsdorf: Krasov
- Kronstadt: Kunštát, now Orlické Záhoří
- Kropfetschlag: Klopanov, now Dolní Dvořiště*
- Kropfschlag: Mýtiny, now Nové Hrady (České Budějovice District)*
- Kropitz: Krapice, p. of Františkovy Lázně
- Kropsdorf: Zábraní, now Malšín*
- Krotiw: Krotějov, p. of Strážov (Klatovy District)
- Krottensee: Mokřina, p. of Milíkov (Cheb District)
- Krauna: Krouna
- Krautenwalde: Travná, p. of Javorník (Jeseník District)
- Kruch: Kruh
- Krugsreuth: Kopaniny, p. of Aš
- Krumau (Krummau, Krumau an der Moldau): Český Krumlov
- Krummwasser: Křivá Voda, p. of Malá Morava
- Krumpisch: Chromeč
- Kruschowitz: Krušovice
- Krzenowitz (Krenowitz):
  - Křenovice (Přerov District)
  - Křenovice (Vyškov District)
- Krzetin (Kretin): Křetín
- Krzeschitz: Křešice
- Kschakau (Krakau): Křakov, p. of Mířkov
- Kschellowitz (Krellowitz): Křelovice (Plzeň-North District)
- Kscheutz: Kšice
- Kschiha: Číhaná, p. of Teplá
- Ktowa: Ktová
- Kubitzen: Česká Kubice
- Kublow (Kublau): Kublov
- Kubohütten: Kubova Huť
- Kuchelna: Chuchelná
- Kühberg: Chřepice, p. of Čachrov
- Künast: Sosnová (Česká Lípa District)
- Kührberg: Mezihorská, now Jindřichovice (Sokolov District)
- Kukan: Kokonín, p. of Jablonec nad Nisou
- Kuklen: Kukleny, p. of Hradec Králové
- Kukus: Kuks
- Kulm: Chlumec (Ústí nad Labem District)
- Kulsam: Odrava
- Kumerau: Komárov, p. of Toužim
- Kummer: Hradčany, p. of Ralsko
- Kummerpursch: Konobrže, now Most*
- Kumrowitz: Brno-Komárov
- Kundratitz:
  - Kundratice
  - Kundratice, p. of Hartmanice (Klatovy District)
- Kunewald: Kunín
- Kuniowitz: Kunějovice
- Kunkowitz:
  - Kunkovice
  - Kunkovice, p. of Čachrov
- Kunnersdorf:
  - Kunratice (Děčín District)
  - Kunratice (Liberec District)
  - Kunratice u Cvikova
  - Liberec XXIX-Kunratice
  - Kunratice, p. of Šluknov
- Kunowitz:
  - Kunovice (Uherské Hradiště District)
  - Kunovice (Vsetín District)
- Kunstadt: Kunštát
- Kunwald (Kunewalde): Kunvald
- Kunzendorf:
  - Dolejší Kunčice, p. of Fulnek
  - Kunčice, p. of Letohrad
  - Kunčice, p. of Staré Město (Šumperk District)
  - Kunčice pod Ondřejníkem
  - Kunčina
- Kupferberg: Měděnec
- Kuprowitz: Kupařovice
- Kurschin: Kořen, p. of Olbramov
- Kuschwarda: Strážný
- Kutsch: Chudeč, p. of Bezvěrov
- Kutscherau: Kučerov
- Kutschersch: Kučeř
- Kutschlin: Kučlín, p. of Hrobčice
- Kuttelberg: Spálené, p. of Holčovice
- Kuttenberg: Kutná Hora
- Kuttendorf: Chotiněves
- Kuttenplan: Chodová Planá
- Kuttenplaner Schmelzthal: Chodovská Huť, p. of Tři Sekery
- Kuttenschloß: Trhanov
- Kuttenthal: Chotětov
- Kutterschitz:
  - Chudeřice
  - Chudeřice, p. of Bílina
- Kuttnau: Chotěnov
- Kuttowenka: Chotovenka, now Světec*
- Kuttowitz: Chotějovice, p. of Světec
- Kwasney (Kwasin): Kvasiny
- Kwassitz: Kvasice
- Kwetow: Květov
- Kwietoschin: Květušov, p. of Polná na Šumavě
- Kwitkau: Kvítkov, p. of Modlany
- Kwittein: Květín, p. of Mohelnice
- Kwon: Chbany
- Kyowitz (Kiowitz): Kyjovice (Opava District)

== L ==
- Laab: Labe, p. of Malá Skála
- Laaden: Lada v Podještědí, p. of Jablonné v Podještědí
- Laas: Láz (Příbram District)
- Labant: Labuť, p. of Staré Sedliště
- Labau: Huť, p. of Pěnčín (Jablonec nad Nisou District)
- Lachenwitz: Lachovice, p. of Vyšší Brod
- Lachowitz: Lachovice, p. of Toužim
- Ladowitz: Ledvice
- Ladung:
  - Lesná, p. of Nová Ves v Horách
  - Loučná, p. of Lom (Most District)
- Lämberg: Lvová, p. of Jablonné v Podještědí
- Lagau: Slavkov, p. of Bohdalovice
- Lahowitz: Lahovice
- Lahrenbochen: Mlýnec, now Vyšší Brod*
- Lainsitz: Lužnice (river)
- Lakowitz: Slavíkovice, p. of Rousínov
- Lammeldorf: Jehnědí
- Lampersdorf: Lampertice
- Lana (Lahna, Lahn): Lány (Kladno District)
- Landek: Otročín
- Landschau über Frain: Lančov
- Landshut in Mähren: Lanžhot
- Landskron: Lanškroun
- Landstein: Landštejn, p. of Staré Město pod Landštejnem
- Landstrassen: Silnice, now Strážný*
- Lang Lammitz (Langlamnitz): Dlouhá Lomnice, p. of Bochov
- Lang Lhotta: Dlouhá Lhota (Blansko District)
- Langstrobnitz: Dlouhá Stropnice, p. of Horní Stropnice
- Lang Ugest: Jenišuv Újezd, now Bílina*
- Langenau:
  - Dlouhý Luh, now Hradiště MTA*
  - Lánov
  - Skalice u České Lípy
- Langenberg: Dlouhá Stráň
- Langenbruck:
  - Dlouhé Mosty, p. of Františkovy Lázně
  - Dlouhý Most
  - Olšina, parts of Horní Planá and Polná na Šumavě
- Langendörflas: Dlouhý Újezd
- Langendorf:
  - Dlouhá Loučka (Olomouc District)
  - Dlouhá Ves (Havlíčkův Brod District)
  - Dlouhá Ves (Klatovy District)
  - Dlouhá Ves, p. of Holčovice
  - Dlouhá Ves, p. of Vrchoslavice
- Langengrund: Dlouhý Důl, p. of Krásná Lípa
- Langenlutsch: Dlouhá Loučka (Svitavy District)
- Langentriebe: Dlouhá Třebová
- Langewiese: Dlouhá Louka, p. of Osek (Teplice District)
- Langgrün: Bystřice, p. of Hroznětín
- Langhaid: Dlouhý Bor, p. of Nová Pec
- Lang Pirnitz (Langpirnitz): Dlouhá Brtnice
- Langwasser: Dlouhá Voda, p. of Město Albrechtice
- Langwiesen:
  - Dlouhá Louka, p. of Lípa nad Orlicí
  - Dlouhá Louka, p. of Lužany (Plzeň-South District)
- Lanz: Lomnice (Sokolov District)
- Lapitzfeld: Lipoltov, p. of Tuřany (Cheb District)
- Lappersdorf: Lipoltov, now Hradiště MTA*
- Larischau: Láryšov, p. of Býkov-Láryšov
- Laschan (Lazan):
  - Lažany (Blansko District)
  - Lažany (Liberec District)
  - Lažany (Strakonice District)
- Laschan Desfours: Defurovy Lažany, p. of Chanovice
- Laschin: Lažany, p. of Štědrá
- Laschkau: Laškov
- Laschkles: Blažkov, p. of Omlenice
- Laske: Lazce, p. of Olomouc
- Latron: Latrán, p. of Český Krumlov
- Laube: Děčín XIII-Loubí
- Laubendorf: Pomezí
- Laubias: Lubojaty, p. of Bílovec
- Laucha: Louchov, p. of Domašín
- Laudmer: Luboměř
- Lauka: Louka, p. of Jemnice
- Laun: Louny
- Launitz: Lounice, p. of Litvínov
- Launowitz: Louňovice pod Blaníkem
- Lausitzer Neiße: Lužická Nisa (river)
- Lauterbach:
  - Čirá, p. of Kraslice
  - Čistá (Svitavy District)
  - Čistá, now Rovná (Sokolov District)*
  - Potůčník, p. of Hanušovice
- Lautersdorf: Čistěves
- Lauterseifen: Pustá Rudná, p. of Andělská Hora (Bruntál District)
- Lauterwasser: Čistá v Krkonoších, p. of Černý Důl
- Lautsch:
  - Loučky, p. of Odry
  - Mladeč
- Lautsche: Loučná, p. of Višňová (Liberec District)
- Lautschek: Sekerkovy Loučky, p. of Mírová pod Kozákovem
- Lautschim: Loučim
- Lautschin: Loučeň
- Lautschitz: Lovčice (Hradec Králové District)
- Lautschnei: Loučná nad Nisou, p. of Janov nad Nisou
- Lauxmühle: Výsada, p. of Vejprty
- Lazan:
  - Lažany (Blansko District)
  - Lažany (Liberec District)
  - Lažany (Strakonice District)
- Lazy: Lazy, p. of Orlová
- Lechwitz: Lechovice
- Ledau (Leedau): Letov, p. of Podbořany
- Ledenitz: Ledenice
- Ledetsch (an der Sasau): Ledeč nad Sázavou
- Leibitsch: Liboc, p. of Kynšperk nad Ohří
- Leickow: Lejčkov, p. of Dolní Hořice
- Leierwinkel: Háje, p. of Lesná (Tachov District)
- Leimgruben: Hlinky, p. of Stanovice (Karlovy Vary District)
- Leimsgrub: Hliništĕ, p. of Strážný
- Leinbaum: Klenová, p. of Nová Bystřice
- Leipertitz: Litobratřice
- Leipnik (Leibnik): Lipník nad Bečvou
- Leiter: Řebří, p. of Svojšín
- Leitersdorf: Litultovice
- Leitmeritz: Litoměřice
- Leitnowitz: Litvínovice
- Leitomischl: Litomyšl
- Lellowa: Lelov, p. of Žalany
- Leneschitz: Lenešice
- Lenzdorf: Mlýnice, p. of Červená Voda (Ústí nad Orlicí District)
- Leopoldsdorf: Leopoldov
- Leopoldsruh: Leopoldka, p. of Velký Šenov
- Lerchenhof: Skřivánek, p. of Okrouhlička
- Lesche: Leština (Šumperk District)
- Leschowitz: Lechovice
- Leschtina: Leština (Ústí nad Orlicí District)
- Leschtine: Leština, p. of Malé Březno (Ústí nad Labem District)
- Leskau:
  - Brno-Starý Lískovec
  - Lestkov (Tachov District)
- Leskenthal: Vítkov, p. of Česká Lípa
- Leskowetz: Lískovec, p. of Frýdek-Místek
- Lesna: Brno-Lesná
- Lesnitz: Lesnice
- Lessau: Lesov, p. of Sadov
- Lettin: Letiny
- Lettowitz: Letovice
- Leukersdorf: Čermná, p. of Libouchec
- Lewanitz: Levonice, p. of Postoloprty
- Lewin: Levín
- Lexen: Líšnice (Šumperk District)
- Lhota unter Liebtschan: Lhota pod Libčany
- Lhotka: Městská Lhotka, p. of Prachatice
- Liban: Libáň
- Libein: Libivá, p. of Mohelnice
- Libejitz: Libějice
- Libetin: Libentiny, p. of Líšný
- Libesnitz: Líbeznice
- Libin: Libyně, p. of Lubenec
- Libisch: Libiš
- Libitz:
  - (an der Zidlina): Libice nad Cidlinou
  - Libice nad Doubravou
- Liblin: Liblín
- Liblitz (Lieblitz): Liblice
- Liboch: Liběchov
- Libochowan: Libochovany
- Libochowitz: Libochovice
- Liboritz: Libořice
- Liboschan: Libočany
- Libotin: Libotyně, p. of Radhostice
- Libotz: Prague-Liboc
- Libschitz an der Moldau: Libčice nad Vltavou
- Libusin: Libušín
- Lichnau: Lichnov (Nový Jičín District)
- Lichten: Lichnov (Bruntál District)
- Lichtenau: Lichkov
- Lichtenberg: Světlík, p. of Horní Podluží
- Lichtenhain:
  - Světliny 1.díl, p. of Varnsdorf
  - Světliny 2.díl, p. of Dolní Podluží
- Lichtenstadt: Hroznětín
- Lichtenstein:
  - Ladečka, p. of Horní Podluží
  - Líšťany (Plzeň-North District)
- Lichtewerden: Světlá, p. of Světlá Hora
- Liditz: Lidice
- Liditzau (Lititzau): Liticov, p. of Ostrov (Karlovy Vary District)
- Liebau: Libina
- Liebauthal: Libavské Údolí
- Lieben:
  - Prague-Libeň
  - Libov, p. of Chuderov
- Liebenau:
  - Hodkovice nad Mohelkou
  - Libnov, p. of Krajková
- Liebenstein: Libá
- Liebenthal:
  - Dolní Dobrouč
  - Liptaň
  - Luboměř pod Strážnou
- Liebeschitz (Libeschitz):
  - Liběšice (Litoměřice District)
  - Liběšice (Louny District)
- Liebesdorf:
  - Hněvanov, p. of Rožmitál na Šumavě
  - Obědné, p. of Libina
- Liebeswar: Libosváry, p. of Vidice (Domažlice District)
- Liebinsdorf (Libinsdorf): Karlov (Žďár nad Sázavou District)
- Liebisch: Libhošť
- Lieboritz: Libořice
- Liebotschan: Libočany
- Liebshausen: Libčeves
- Liebstadtl: Libštát
- Liebtschan (Libcan): Libčany
- Liedlhöfen: Lídlovy Dvory, p. of Kašperské Hory
- Liehn: Líně
- Liesdorf: Liboňov, p. of Telnice (Ústí nad Labem District)
- Liessnitz: Lysec, p. of Bžany (Teplice District)
- Lihn: Hlinné, p. of Tisová (Tachov District)
- Liliendorf: Lesná (Znojmo District)
- Limpach: Lipnice, p. of Kunratice (Děčín District)
- Lindau: Lipná, p. of Hazlov
- Linden:
  - Linda, now Přední Výtoň*
  - Lípa (Havlíčkův Brod District)
  - Machnatec, now Rožmberk nad Vltavou
- Lindenau:
  - Lindava, p. of Cvikov
  - Lipná, p. of Potštát
- Lindenhau: Lipová (Cheb District)
- Lindewiese: Lipová-Lázně
- Lindig: Lípa, p. of Merklín (Karlovy Vary District)
- Lindles: Mlyňany, now Žlutice*
- Lindner Waldhäuser: Lindské Chalupy, now Přední Výtoň*
- Lingau: Nynkov, p. of Svojšín
- Linschen: Hlince, p. of Kostomlaty pod Milešovkou
- Linsdorf: Těchonín
- Lintsch: Hlinec, p. of Bochov
- Linz: Mlýnce, p. of Vroutek
- Lipkau: Libkov (Domažlice District)
- Lipkowawoda (Libekswasser): Libkova Voda
- Lipnik:
  - Lipník (Mladá Boleslav District)
  - Lipník (Třebíč District)
- Lipnitz (an der Sasau): Lipnice nad Sázavou
- Lipolz: Lipolec, p. of Dačice
- Lippen: Lipno nad Vltavou
- Lippin: Lipina, p. of Štáblovice
- Lippowetz: Lipovec (Blansko District)
- Lipthal: Liptál
- Liquitz: Libkovice, p. of Mariánské Radčice*
- Lischan: Lišany (Louny District)
- Lischau: Lišov
- Lischin: Líšina
- Lischnei: Líšný
- Lischnitz: Lišnice
- Lischtian: Líšťany (Louny District)
- Lischwitz: Liběšovice, p. of Blšany
- Lisek: Lísek
- Lispitz: Blížkovice
- Lissa an der Elbe: Lysá nad Labem
- Lissitz: Lysice
- Lissowa: Lisov
- Lissowitz: Lysovice
- Litentschitz (Littentschitz, Litenschitz): Litenčice
- Lititz: Litice nad Orlicí
- Litschau: Ličov, p. of Benešov nad Černou
- Litschkau: Líčkov, p. of Liběšice (Louny District)
- Litschnitz: Ličenice, p. of Úštěk
- Littau: Litovel
- Litten: Liteň
- Littengrün: Lítov, p. of Habartov
- Littitsch: Litíč
- Littitz an der Adler: Litice nad Orlicí, p. of Záchlumí (Ústí nad Orlicí District)
- Littmitz: Lipnice, now Vintířov*
- Lobeditz: Zlovědice, p. of Krásný Dvůr
- Lobendau: Lobendava
- Lobenstein: Úvalno
- Lobes:
  - Lobeč
  - Plzeň-Lobzy
- Lobeskirchen: Horní Cerekev
- Lobiesching: Lověšice, now Přídolí*
- Lobieschinger Ruben: Lověšické Rovné, now Přídolí*
- Lobnig: Lomnice (Bruntál District)
- Lobositz: Lovosice
- Lobs: Lobzy, p. of Březová (Sokolov District)
- Loch: Dolina, p. of Krajková
- Lochowitz: Lochovice
- Lochutzen: Lochousice
- Lodenitz:
  - Loděnice (Beroun District)
  - Loděnice (Brno-Country District)
  - Loděnice, p. of Holasovice
- Lodus: Mladoňov, now Dolní Dvořiště*
- Lohof: Luhov, p. of Toužim
- Lösch: Brno-Líšeň
- Löschna: Lešná
- Lohhäuser: Slatina, now Stará Voda (Cheb District)*
- Lohm: Lomy, p. of Kokašice
- Lohm bei Mies: Lom u Stříbra, p. of Benešovice
- Lohm bei Tachau: Lom u Tachova
- Lometz: Lomec
- Lomigsdorf: Dlouhomilov
- Lomnitschka: Lomnička (Brno-Country District)
- Lomnitz:
  - Lomnice (Brno-Country District)
  - (an der Lainsitz): Lomnice nad Lužnicí
  - (an der Popelka): Lomnice nad Popelkou
- Loosch: Lahošť
- Loosdorf (Losdorf): Ludvíkovice
- Loschau: Lošov, p. of Olomouc
- Loschitz: Loštice
- Losnitz: Lazec, p. of Kájov
- Lossin:
  - Losiná
  - Losina, p. of Chotěšov (Plzeň-South District)
- Lotschenitz: Ločenice
- Lounowitz: Louňovice
- Louschnitz (Louznitz): Loužnice
- Lsten: Lštění
- Lub: Luby, p. of Chyše
- Lubens (Lubenz): Lubenec
- Lubokey: Liberec XXVIII-Hluboká
- Luck:
  - Luka, p. of Verušičky
  - Lukavec, p. of Fulnek
- Ludgierzowitz (Ludgerstal): Ludgeřovice
- Ludikau: Ludíkov
- Luditz: Žlutice
- Ludwigsthal:
  - Ludvíkov
  - Ludvíkov, p. of Velké Losiny
- Luggau: Lukov (Znojmo District)
- Luhatschowitz: Luhačovice
- Luh: Luhov, p. of Brniště
- Luk: Luká
- Luka: Lukov, p. of Úštěk
- Lukau:
  - Hlávkov, p. of Vyskytná nad Jihlavou
  - Loučová, p. of Hartmanice (Klatovy District)
- Lukawetz (Lukawitz):
  - Lukavec (Pelhřimov District)
  - Lukavice (Šumperk District)
  - Lukavec, p. of Bor (Tachov District)
- Luken: Luka (Česká Lípa District)
- Lukow: Lukov (Teplice District)
- Lukowa: Luková, p. of Brodek u Přerova
- Lultsch: Luleč
- Lundenburg: Břeclav
- Lupelle: Lupěné, p. of Nemile
- Lupenz: Slupenec, p. of Český Krumlov
- Luppetsching: Slupečná, p. of Lipno nad Vltavou
- Lusading: Služetín, p. of Teplá
- Luschan:
  - Lužany (Hradec Králové District)
  - Lužany (Plzeň-South District)
- Lusche: Luže (Chrudim District)
- Luschetz an der Moldau: Lužec nad Vltavou
- Luschitz:
  - Lužice (Hodonín District)
  - Lužice (Most District)
- Luschtienitz (Lustenitz): Luštěnice
- Luschna: Lužná (Rakovník District)
- Luschne: Lužná, p. of Větřní
- Luschnitz: Lužnice, p. of Pohorská Ves
- Lusdorf an der Tafelfichte: Ludvíkov pod Smrkem, p. of Nové Město pod Smrkem
- Lusen: Lužná, p. of Bor (Tachov District)
- Lusetin: Služetín, p. of Bezvěrov
- Lutschau: Loučej, p. of Křemže
- Lutschen: Loučky, p. of Vílanec
- Lutschkahäuseln: Loučky
- Luxdorf: Lukášov, p. of Jablonec nad Nisou
- Luzan:
  - Lužany (Hradec Králové District)
  - Lužany (Jičín District)

== M ==
- Machau: Machov
- Machendorf: Liberec XXXIII-Machnín
- Machowitz: Machovice, p. of Pertoltice (Kutná Hora District)
- Mader: Modrava
- Maffersdorf: Liberec XXX-Vratislavice nad Nisou
- Mähren: Morava
- Mährisch Altstadt: Staré Město (Šumperk District)
- Mährisch Aussee: Úsov
- Mährisch Budwitz: Moravské Budějovice
- Mährisch Chrostau: Moravská Chrastová, p. of Brněnec
- Mährisch Hause: Moravská Huzová, p. of Štěpánov
- Mährisch Karlsdorf: Moravský Karlov, p. of Červená Voda (Ústí nad Orlicí District)
- Mährisch Kotzendorf: Moravský Kočov, p. of Moravskoslezský Kočov
- Mährisch Kromau: Moravský Krumlov
- Mährisch Lotschnau: Lačnov, p. of Svitavy
- Mährisch Neudorf: Moravská Nová Ves
- Mährisch Neustadt: Uničov
- Mährisch Ostrau: Moravská Ostrava, p. of Ostrava
- Mährisch Pisek: Moravský Písek
- Mährisch Pruß (Mährisch Preußen): Moravské Prusy, p. of Prusy-Boškůvky
- Mährisch Rothwasser: Červená Voda (Ústí nad Orlicí District)
- Mährisch Schönberg: Šumperk
- Mährisch Trübau: Moravská Třebová
- Mährisch und Schlesisch Kotzendorf: Moravskoslezský Kočov
- Mährisch Weißkirchen: Hranice (Přerov District)
- Mährisch Wiesen: Moravská Dlouhá, now Březová nad Svitavou
- Maidelberg: Dívčí Hrad
- Maierhof: Humenice, p. of Horní Stropnice
- Maierhöfen: Dvory, now Bukovany (Sokolov District)*
- Maiersgrün: Vysoká, p. of Stará Voda (Cheb District)
- Maiwald: Májůvka, p. of Bílčice
- Malec: Maleč
- Malenitz: Malenice
- Malenowitz: Malenovice
- Maleschitz: Malesice, p. of Dříteň
- Malesitz:
  - Malesice, p. of Plzeň
  - Prague-Malešice
- Maleschau: Malešov
- Malhostitz: Malhostice, p. of Rtyně nad Bílinou
- Malkau: Málkov (Chomutov District)
- Malkowitz: Málkovice, p. of Bor (Tachov District)
- Mallinetz: Malinec
- Mallowitz: Malovice, p. of Bor (Tachov District)
- Malnitz: Malnice, p. of Postoloprty
- Malonitz: Malonice, p. of Blížejov
- Malotitz: Malotice
- Maloweska: Malá Víska
- Malschen: Malečov
- Malsching: Malšín
- Malschitz: Malšice
- Malschwitz: Malšovice
- Malspitz: Malešovice
- Maltheuern: Záluží, p. of Litvínov
- Maltsch: Malše (river)
- Maltsche: Malče, p. of Besednice
- Maltschitz: Malčice, p. of Mirkovice
- Manetin: Manětín
- Manisch: Manušice, p. of Česká Lípa
- Mankendorf: Mankovice
- Mansdorf: Jedvaniny, p. of Nečtiny
- Mantau: Mantov, p. of Chotěšov (Plzeň-South District)
- March: Morava (river)
- Margarethendorf: Marketa, p. of Dolní Poustevna
- Maria Kulm: Chlum Svaté Maří
- Maria Ratschitz: Mariánské Radčice
- Maria Schnee: U Svatého Kamene, now Dolní Dvořiště
- Maria Teinitz: Mariánský Týnec
- Mariafels: Slavice, p. of Horní Kozolupy
- Mariaschein: Bohosudov, p. of Krupka
- Mariasorg: Mariánská, p. of Jáchymov
- Mariastock: Skoky, p. of Žlutice
- Marienbad: Mariánské Lázně
- Marienberg:
  - Mariánské Hory, p. of Ostrava
  - Mariánská Hora, p. of Albrechtice v Jizerských horách
- Marienthal:
  - Mariánské Údolí, p. of Hlubočky
  - Mariánské Údolí, p. of Horní Jiřetín
- Markhausen:
  - Hraničná, p. of Kraslice
  - Pomezná, now Libá*
- Markausch: Markoušovice, p. of Velké Svatoňovice
- Markersdorf:
  - Markvartice (Děčín District)
  - Markvartice, p. of Jablonné v Podještědí
  - Nová Hradečná
  - Markvartovice
- Markl: Pomezí, p. of Staré Město pod Landštejnem
- Markscheid: Rozdělov, p. of Kladno
- Markt Bürglitz: Velký Vřešťov
- Markt Eisenstein: Železná Ruda
- Markt Janowitz: Vrchotovy Janovice
- Markt Joslowitz: Jaroslavice
- Markt Kamnitz: Trhová Kamenice
- Markt Roßwald: Slezské Rudoltice
- Markt Stankau: Staňkov I, p. of Staňkov (Domažlice District)
- Markt Stiepanau: Trhový Štěpánov
- Markt Türnau: Městečko Trnávka
- Markus zu Krizowitz: Markov or Marky
- Markusgrün: Podlesí, p. of Dolní Žandov
- Markwarding: Markvarec, p. of Český Rudolec
- Markwartitz: Markvartice, p. of Zubčice
- Marletzgrün: Maroltov, p. of Ostrov (Karlovy Vary District)
- Maroditz: Martice, now Bochov*
- Marschen: Maršov, p. of Krupka
- Marschendorf:
  - Horní Maršov
  - Maršíkov, p. of Velké Losiny
- Marschow (Marschau): Maršov
- Marschowitz: Maršovice (Jablonec nad Nisou District)
- Martetschlag: Martínkov
- Martinau: Martinov, p. of Ostrava
- Martinitz: Martinice v Krkonoších
- Martnau: Martinov, p. of Vlkovice
- Märzdorf: Martínkovice
- Maschakotten: Maršovy Chody, p. of Částkov (Tachov District)
- Maschau: Mašťov
- Maßhaupt: Kročehlavy, p. of Kladno
- Mastig: Mostek (Trutnov District)
- Mastirowitz: Mastířovice, p. of Vrbice (Litoměřice District)
- Mastung: Mostec, p. of Štědrá
- Matschitz: Mačice, p. of Soběšice
- Matzdorf: Matějovice, p. of Rusín
- Mauth: Mýto
- Mauthaus: Mýtnice, now Nemanice*
- Mauthdorf: Mýto, p. of Tachov
- Mauthstadt: Mýto, p. of Hořice na Šumavě
- Maxberg: Maxov, p. of Všeruby (Domažlice District)
- Maxdorf:
  - Děčín XVIII-Maxičky
  - Maxov, p. of Radvanec
- Mayerbach: Dolní Borková, now Horní Planá*
- Medleschitz: Medlešice, p. of Chrudim
- Medlitz: Medlice
- Meedel (Meedl): Medlov (Olomouc District)
- Meeden: Medná, p. of Srby (Domažlice District)
- Mehlhiedl: Lhotka, p. of Křemže
- Mehlhüttel: Masákova Lhota, p. of Zdíkov
- Mehregarten: Zahrádky, p. of Borová Lada
- Meierhöfen: Dvory, p. of Karlovy Vary
- Meigelshof: Chodov (Domažlice District)
- Meinetschlag: Malonty
- Meisetschlag: Míšňany, now Boletice MTA*
- Meistersdorf: Mistrovice
- Melchiorshütte:
- Melhut: Chodská Lhota
- Melm: Jelm, now Horní Planá
- Melmitz: Mělnice, p. of Hostouň (Domažlice District)
- Melnik: Mělník
- Meltsch: Melč
- Menian (Mnienan): Měňany
- Meretitz: Miřetice u Vintířova, p. of Radonice (Chomutov District)
- Merkelsdorf: Merklovice, p. of Teplice nad Metují
- Merkelsgrün: Merklín (Karlovy Vary District)
- Merklin: Merklín (Plzeň-South District)
- Merklowitz: Merklovice, p. of Vamberk
- Meronitz: Měrunice
- Merotein: Mirotínek, p. of Tvrdkov
- Merschlitz (Merzlitz): Mrzlice, p. of Hrobčice
- Mertendorf: Merboltice
- Merzdorf:
  - Břevniště, p. of Hamr na Jezeře
  - Martiněves, p. of Jílové
  - Martinice v Krkonoších
  - Martínkovice
- Meseritz: Meziříčí, p. of Kadaň
- Mesimost: Veselí nad Lužnicí II
- Mesletsch: Mezilečí
- Mesoles: Mezholezy, p. of Miskovice
- Messendorf: Mezina
- Meßhals: Mezholezy (former Horšovský Týn District)
- Meßholz: Mezholezy (former Domažlice District)
- Metschin (Mietschin): Měčín
- Mettilowitz: Metylovice
- Metzling: Meclov
- Michalkowitz: Michálkovice, p. of Ostrava
- Michalkowitz: Michálkovice, p. of Ostrava
- Michelob (Micholup): Měcholupy (Louny District)
- Michelsberg (Michaelsberg): Michalovy Hory, p. of Chodová Planá
- Michelsdorf:
  - Ostrov (Ústí nad Orlicí District)
  - Veliká Ves (Chomutov District)
- Michetschlag: Javoří, now Boletice MTA*
- Michnitz: Michnice, p. of Rožmitál na Šumavě
- Michowitz: Mnichovice (Benešov District)
- Michowka: Michovka, p. of Koberovy
- Mierowitz: Měrovice nad Hanou
- Mies:
  - Měchov, p. of Otročín
  - Mechová, p. of Lipová (Cheb District)
  - Stříbro
- Miesau: Vyšný, now Křišťanov*
- Mieschitz: Měšice
- Milau: Milov
- Milay: Milá, p. of Bečov
- Milbes: Milovany, now Libavá MTA*
- Mildenau: Luh, now Raspenava
- Mildeneichen: Lužec, now Raspenava
- Mileschau: Milešov
- Miletin: Miletín
- Miletitz: Miletice, p. of Nepoměřice
- Milikau:
  - (Millikau): Milíkov (Frýdek-Místek District)
  - Milíkov, p. of Černá (Žďár nad Sázavou District)
  - Milkov, now Lestkov (Tachov District)*
- Milin: Milín
- Militschowes: Milíčeves, p. of Slatiny
- Milkendorf: Milotice nad Opavou
- Millay: Milá, p. of Bečov
- Milles: Mlýnec, p. of Přimda
- Milleschau: Milešov, p. of Velemín
- Millestau: Milhostov, p. of Zádub-Závišín
- Milletitz: Miletice, p. of Černuc
- Millik: Milence, p. of Dešenice
- Millikau: Milíkov, p. of Stříbro
- Millonitz (Milonitz): Milonice (Blansko District)
- Millotitz (an der Betschwa): Milotice nad Bečvou
- Millowitz: Milovice (Břeclav District)
- Miloschitz: Milošice, p. of Měcholupy (Louny District)
- Miloschowitz: Milošovice, p. of Vlastějovice
- Milostowitz: Milostovice, p. of Opava
- Milotitz: Milotice
- Milowitz: Milovice
- Milsau: Milžany, now Kadaň*
- Miltigau: Milíkov (Cheb District)
- Miltschin: Miličín
- Miltschitz: Milčice
- Miltschowes: Milčeves, p. of Žatec
- Minichschlag: Martínkov
- Minichschlag: Mnichovice, now Loučovice
- Minkwitz (Minkowitz): Minkovice, p. of Višňová (Liberec District)
- Mireschowitz: Mirošovice, p. of Hrobčice
- Miretitz (Mirschetitz): Miřetice (Chrudim District)
- Mirikau (Mirschigkau): Mířkov
- Mirkowitz: Mirkovice
- Miroditz: Mirotice, p. of Bochov
- Miroschau:
  - Mirošov (Jihlava District)
  - Mirošov (Žďár nad Sázavou District)
- Miröschau: Mirošov (Rokycany District)
- Miroschowitz: Mirošovice
- Mirotein (Měrotein): Měrotín
- Mirotitz: Mirotice
- Mirowitz: Mirovice
- Mirschikau: Mířkov
- Misching: Měšín
- Miserau: Mizerov, p. of Karviná
- Miskowitz: Myslkovice
- Misliboritz (Missliborzitz): Myslibořice
- Misloschowitz (Misloczowitz): Mysločovice
- Mislowitz: Myslovice
- Misslitz: Miroslav (Znojmo District)
- Mistek: Místek, p. of Frýdek-Místek
- Mistelholz: Borová, p. of Chvalšiny
- Mistlholzkollern: Borovští Uhlíři, now Chvalšiny
- Mistrzowitz: Mistřovice, p. of Český Těšín
- Mitrowitz: Mitrovice, p. of Moravičany
- Mitschowitz: Mičovice
- Mittel Bludowitz: Prostřední Bludovice, p. of Horní Bludovice
- Mitteldorf:
  - Prostředkovice, p. of Suchá
  - Prostřední Rokytnice, now Rokytnice v Orlických horách
- Mittelgrund: Děčín XV-Prostřední Žleb
- Mittelhof: Prostřední Dvůr, p. of Vítkov
- Mittelkörnsalz: Prostřední Krušec, p. of Hartmanice (Klatovy District)
- Mittel Langenau: Prostřední Lánov, p. of Lánov
- Mittelwald: Hranice VIII-Středolesí
- Mitterberg: Račí, p. of Horní Vltavice
- Mitterdorf: Miroslav (Znojmo District)
- Mitterwiedern: Prostřední Vydří, p. of Dačice
- Mitterzwinzen: Prostřední Svince, p. of Dolní Třebonín
- Mitzmanns: Micmanice, p. of Strachotice
- Mladejow: Mladějov
- Mladetzko: Mladecko
- Mladotitz: Mladotice
- Mlasowitz: Mlázovice
- Mlazow: Mlázovy, p. of Kolinec
- Mlikowitz: Mlékovice, p. of Toušice
- Mlinarowitz: Mlynářovice, p. of Plánice
- Mnich: Mnich (Pelhřimov District)
- Mnichowitz: Mnichovice
- Mnischek: Mníšek pod Brdy
- Mochau (Mohau): Mochov, p. of Hartmanice (Klatovy District)
- Mochow: Mochov
- Modlan: Modlany
- Modlenitz: Modlenice, p. of Vimperk
- Mödlau: Medlov (Brno-Country District)
- Mödlitz: Medlice, now Jakartovice
- Modran: Prague-Modřany
- Mödritz: Modřice
- Modschiedl: Močidlec, p. of Pšov
- Mönitz: Měnín
- Möritschau: Mořičov, p. of Ostrov (Karlovy Vary District)
- Mösing: Mezí, p. of Manětín
- Mohelno: Mohelno
- Mogolzen: Bukovec
- Mohr: Mory, p. of Podbořany
- Mohradorf: Zálužné, p. of Vítkov
- Mokowitz: Hřivínov, p. of Verušičky
- Mokra: Mokrá, p. of Vesce
- Mokrau:
  - Mokrá, p. of Čichalov
  - Mokrá, p. of Mokrá-Horákov
- Mokrolasetz: Mokré Lazce
- Moldau:
  - Moldava (Teplice District)
  - Vltava (river)
- Moldautein (Moldauthein): Týn nad Vltavou
- Moletein: Maletín
- Molgau: Málkov, p. of Přimda
- Mönchsdorf: Mniší, p. of Kopřivnice
- Möndrik: Mendryka, p. of Janov (Svitavy District)
- Moraschitz:
  - Morašice (Chrudim District)
  - Morašice (Pardubice District)
  - Morašice (Svitavy District)
- Moratitz: Morašice (Znojmo District)
- Morawan: Moravany (Pardubice District)
- Morawes: Moravěves, p. of Havraň
- Morawetsch: Moraveč
- Morawetz: Moravec
- Morawitschan: Moravičany
- Morawitz: Moravice
- Morbes: Moravany (Brno-Country District)
- Morchenstern (Morchelstern): Smržovka
- Moritz (Morzitz): Mořice
- Mörkau: Mírkov, p. of Povrly
- Morkowitz: Morkovice, p. of Morkovice-Slížany
- Morwan: Moravany, p. of Řehlovice
- Moschen: Mošnov, p. of Bžany (Teplice District)
- Mosern: Mojžíř, p. of Ústí nad Labem
- Mosetstift: Mackova Lhota, now Ktiš
- Moskelle: Mostkov, p. of Oskava
- Moskowitz: Mackovice
- Mosting: Mostice, p. of Zahrádka (Plzeň-North District)
- Mostau: Mostov, p. of Odrava
- Mosty: Mosty u Jablunkova
- Motitschin: Švermov, p. of Kladno
- Mottowitz: Matějovice, p. of Dešenice
- Motzdorf: Mackov
- Moyne: Mojné
- Mraditz: Mradice, p. of Postoloprty
- Mrakotin: Mrákotín (Chrudim District)
- Mritsch: Mříč, p. of Křemže
- Mscheno:
  - Mšené-lázně
  - Mšeno
- Muckenschlag (Mükenschlag): Komáří Paseka, now Přední Výtoň*
- Muckenbrunn: Studénka, p. of Štoky
- Muglinau: Muglinov, p. of Ostrava
- Müglitz: Mohelnice
- Mugrau: Mokrá, p. of Černá v Pošumaví
- Mühlbach: Pomezí nad Ohří
- Mühlberg: Lesík, p. of Nejdek
- Mühldorf: Mlýnská, now Loučovice*
- Mühlendorf: Smilov, p. of Stráž nad Ohří
- Mühlessen: Milhostov
- Mühlfraun: Dyje (Znojmo District)
- Mühlgrün: Mlýnek, p. of Nový Kostel
- Mühlhausen:
  - Milevsko
  - Nelahozeves
- Mühlhöfen: Milevo, p. of Kladruby (Tachov District)
- Mühlloch: Mílov, now Přimda*
- Mühlnöd: Milná, p. of Frymburk
- Mühlscheibe: Mlýnice, p. of Nová Ves (Liberec District)
- Mukow: Mukov, p. of Hrobčice
- Müllerschlag: Mlynářovice, p. of Volary
- Müllersgrün: Milešov, now Krásno (Sokolov District)*
- Müllestau: Milhostov, p. of Zádub-Závišín
- Mülln: Štědrá, p. of Kynšperk nad Ohří
- München: Mnichov, p. of Velké Chvojno
- Münchengrätz: Mnichovo Hradiště
- Münchhof: Mírová
- Münchsberg: Vojnův Městec
- Münchsdorf: Mnichov (Domažlice District)
- Münitz: Minice, p. of Velemyšleves
- Münkendorf: Minkovice, p. of Šimonovice
- Mürau: Mírov
- Mukarschow: Mukařov, p. of Malá Skála
- Mukowa: Buková, p. of Mezholezy (former Horšovský Týn District)
- Muncifay (Munzifay): Smečno
- Munker: Mukařov, p. of Lovečkovice
- Murchova: Mrchojedy
- Murk: Mořkov
- Muschau: Mušov, now Pasohlávky*
- Muslau: Muzlov, now Březová nad Svitavou
- Mutenitz: Mutěnice (Strakonice District)
- Mutowitz (Mutiowitz): Mutějovice
- Muttersdorf: Mutěnín
- Mutzgern: Muckov, p. of Černá v Pošumaví
- Mutzken: Muckov, p. of Bor (Tachov District)
- Mysliw: Myslív

== N ==
- Nabsel: Bzí, p. of Železný Brod
- Nachles: Náhlov, now Frymburk
- Nachod: Náchod
- Nadejkow (Nadiegkau): Nadějkov
- Nadschow: Hnacov
- Nahlau: Náhlov, p. of Ralsko
- Nahoretitz: Nahořečice, p. of Valeč (Karlovy Vary District)
- Nahoschitz: Nahošice, p. of Blížejov
- Nakel: Náklo
- Nakersch: Nákří
- Nallesgrün: Nadlesí, p. of Loket
- Namiescht: Náměšť na Hané
- Namiest (an der Oslawa): Náměšť nad Oslavou
- Napajedl (Napagedl): Napajedla
- Nassaberg: Nasavrky
- Nassenbart: Mokrovousy
- Nassendorf: Hely, p. of Krásná Lípa
- Nassengrub: Mokřiny, p. of Aš
- Natscheradetz: Načeradec
- Natschung: Načetín, p. of Kalek
- Nawarow: Návarov, p. of Zlatá Olešnice (Jablonec nad Nisou District)
- Nawsi: Návsí
- Nebahau: Nebahovy
- Nebanitz: Nebanice
- Nebes: Nedvězí, p. of Rohle
- Nebillau: Nebílovy
- Nebosedl: Novosedly, p. of Pšov
- Nebotein: Hněvotín
- Nebuzel: Nebužely
- Nechanitz: Nechanice
- Nechwalitz:
  - Nechvalice
  - Nechvalice, p. of Bystřany
- Nedakonitz: Nedakonice
- Nedraschitz: Nedražice, p. of Kostelec (Tachov District)
- Nedweiss: Nedvězí, p. of Olomouc
- Nedwieditz: Nedvědice
- Nefke: Hněvkov, p. of Zábřeh
- Neid: Závist, p. of Rybník (Domažlice District)
- Nekor: Nekoř
- Nemaus: Nemojov
- Nemcitz:
  - Němčice (Domažlice District)
  - Němčice (Strakonice District)
- Nemelkau:
  - Nemilkov, p. of Lišnice
  - Nemilkov, p. of Velhartice
- Nemetschken: Němečky, p. of Ohníč
- Nemetzky (Niemetzke): Sněžné (Žďár nad Sázavou District)
- Nemischl: Nemyšl
- Nemschen: Němčí, p. of Malečov
- Nemtschitz: Němčice (Domažlice District)
- Neosablitz: Nezabylice
- Neplachowitz: Neplachovice
- Nepodritz: Velké Nepodřice, p. of Dobev
- Nepomischl: Nepomyšl
- Nepomuk: Capartice, p. of Klenčí pod Čerchovem
- Neratowitz: Neratovice
- Neretein: Neředín, p. of Olomouc
- Neschikau: Nežichov, p. of Toužim
- Neschwitz: Děčín XXXIII-Nebočady
- Nesdenitz: Nezdenice
- Nesnaschow:
  - Neznášov, p. of Rožnov (Náchod District)
  - (Nezdaschow): Neznašov, p. of Všemyslice
- Nesnitz: Nezdice, p. of Teplá
- Nespitz: Nespice, p. of Vacov
- Nespoding: Mezipotočí, p. of Kájov
- Nesselbach: Větrná, now Malšín
- Nesselsdorf: Kopřivnice
- Nestersitz: Neštědice, p. of Povrly
- Nestomitz: Neštěmice, p. of Ústí nad Labem
- Netolitz (Nettoliz): Netolice
- Netrobitz: Netřebice (Český Krumlov District)
- Netschenitz: Nečemice, p. of Tuchořice
- Netschetin: Nečtiny
- Netschich: Nečichy, p. of Louny
- Netschin: Nečín
- Nettin: Netín
- Networitz: Netvořice
- Neubäu: Novosedly, p. of Nemanice
- Neubäuhütten: Novosedelské Hutě, p. of Nemanice
- Neu Benatek: Benátky nad Jizerou I
- Neuberg:
  - Podhradí (Cheb District)
  - Tisovka, p. of Ktiš
- Neubidschow (Neubydžow): Nový Bydžov
- Neu Biela: Nová Bělá, p. of Ostrava
- Neubistritz (Neu-Bistritz): Nová Bystřice
- Neu Bohmen: Nová Bohyně, p. of Malšovice
- Neubrunn: Nová Studnice, p. of Hradečno
- Neubürgles: Nový Hrádek
- Neu Cerekwe (Neu Zerekwe): Nová Cerekev
- Neudek:
  - Najdek, p. of Lodhéřov
  - Nejdek
- Neu Donawitz: Nové Stanovice, p. of Stanovice (Karlovy Vary District)
- Neudorf:
  - Děčín XX-Nová Ves
  - Konstantinovy Lázně
  - Lázně Bělohrad
  - Moravská Nová Ves
  - Nová Ves (Český Krumlov District)
  - Nová Ves (Sokolov District)
  - Nová Ves, p. of Děkov
  - Nová Ves, p. of Hora Svatého Šebestiána
  - Nová Ves, p. of Kocbeře
  - Nová Ves, p. of Křižovatka
  - Nová Ves, p. of Litovel
  - Nová Ves, p. of Ostrava
  - Nová Ves, p. of Třemešné
  - Ostrožská Nová Ves
  - (Neudorf-Alt): Vysoká, p. of Malá Morava
  - Žárová, p. of Velké Losiny
- Neudorf an der Neiße: Nová Ves nad Nisou
- Neudorf an der Popelka: Nová Ves nad Popelkou
- Neudorf bei Bautsch: Nové Oldřůvky, now Libavá MTA*
- Neudorf bei Plan: Trstěnice (Cheb District)
- Neudörfel:
  - Česká Ves, p. of Domašín
  - Nová Ves, p. of Teplice
  - Nová Ves, p. of Volfartice
  - Nová Ves u Pláně, p. of Homole u Panny
  - Nová Véska, p. of Norberčany
  - Nová Véska, p. of Staré Město (Bruntál District)
  - Nová Víska, p. of Bezvěrov
  - Nová Víska, now Boletice MTA*
  - Nová Víska, p. of Dolní Poustevna
  - Nová Víska, p. of Město Albrechtice
  - Nová Víska, p. of Nová Ves (Liberec District)
- Neudörfl:
  - Nová Víska, p. of Kadaň
  - Nová Víska, p. of Hájek (Karlovy Vary District)
  - Nová Víska, p. of Stružná
  - Nová Víska u Rokle, p. of Rokle
- Neu Ehrenberg: Nové Křečany, p. of Staré Křečany
- Neuenbrand: Nový Ždár, p. of Aš
- Neuenburg an der Elbe: Nymburk
- Neu Erbersdorf: Nové Heřminovy
- Neuern: Nýrsko
- Neufalkenburg: Zámecká, p. of Jablonné v Podještědí
- Neufang: Stříbrné Hory, p. of Horní Město
- Neufürstenhütte: Nová Knížecí Huť, now Lesná (Tachov District)*
- Neugarten: Zahrádky (Česká Lípa District)
- Neugasse: Nová Ulice, p. of Olomouc
- Neugebäu: Nový Svět, p. of Borová Lada
- Neugedein: Kdyně
- Neu Georgswalde: Nový Jiříkov, p. of Jiříkov
- Neugeschrei: Nové Zvolání, now Vejprty
- Neugrafenwalde: Nové Hraběcí, p. of Šluknov
- Neugramatin: Nový Kramolín
- Neugrund: Novosedlo, p. of Žandov
- Neuhammer (bei Karlsbad): Nové Hamry
- Neu Harzdorf: Liberec XVI-Nový Harcov
- Neuhaus: Jindřichův Hradec
- Neuhäusel: Nové Domky, p. of Loučovice
- Neuhäusl:
  - Hlupenov, p. of Bor (Tachov District)
  - Nové Domky, p. of Rozvadov
- Neuhäuser:
  - Nové Chalupy, p. of Nová Pec
  - Nové Chalupy, now Volary*
  - Nové Domy, p. of Oloví
- Neuhof:
  - Nové Dvory, p. of Bystřany
  - Nový Dvůr (Nymburk District)
  - Nový Dvůr, p. of Bor (Tachov District)
  - Nový Dvůr, p. of Bělá nad Radbuzou
  - Nový Dvůr, p. of Stěbořice
- Neu Hradek (Neuhradek): Nový Hrádek
- Neu Hrosenkau (Neu Hrosinkau, Neu Traubendorf): Nový Hrozenkov
- Neuhübel: Nová Horka, p. of Studénka
- Neuhüblern: Nová Houžna, now Lenora (Prachatice District)
- Neuhurkenthal: Nová Hůrka, p. of Prášily
- Neuhütten: Nová Huť, now Blovice
- Neu Hwiezdlitz: Nové Hvězdlice, p. of Hvězdlice
- Neujahrsdorf: Nouzov, p. of Litíč
- Neukaunitz: Nové Kounice, p. of Bochov
- Neu Kesterschan: Nové Kestřany, p. of Štěkeň
- Neukirchen: Nový Kostel
- Neu Knin: Nový Knín
- Neu Kolin: Kolín
- Neu Königgrätz: Nový Hradec Králové, p. of Hradec Králové
- Neu Kreibitz: Nová Chřibská, p. of Rybniště
- Neuland: Ostré, p. of Úštěk
- Neulosimthal: Jedlina
- Neu Lublitz: Nové Lublice
- Neuluh: Nový Luhov, p. of Brniště
- Neumark: Všeruby (Domažlice District)
- Neumarkt: Úterý
- Neumettl (Neumittel): Neumětely
- Neu Mitrowitz: Nové Mitrovice
- Neu Modlan: Nové Modlany, p. of Krupka
- Neu Moletein: Nový Maletín, p. of Maletín
- Neumühle: Nemile
- Neundorf: Nová Ves (Liberec District)
- Neu Oderberg: Nový Bohumín, p. of Bohumín
- Neuofen: Nová Pec
- Neu Ohlisch: Nová Oleška, p. of Huntířov
- Neuötting-Vtschelnitz: Nová Včelnice
- Neupaka: Nová Paka
- Neu Parisau: Nový Pařezov, p. of Pařezov
- Neu Paulsdorf: Liberec XIII-Nové Pavlovice
- Neupohlen: Nové Spolí, p. of Český Krumlov
- Neu Possigkau: Díly
- Neu Prennet: Nový Spálenec, p. of Česká Kubice
- Neuprerau: Nový Přerov
- Neu Raunek: Nový Rounek, now Vyskytná nad Jihlavou
- Neu Raußnitz (Neu Rausnitz): Rousínov
- Neu Reichenau: Nový Rychnov
- Neureisch: Nová Říše
- Neu Rettendorf: Nové Kocbeře, p. of Kocbeře
- Neurode: Nová Pláň
- Neu Rognitz: Nový Rokytník, p. of Trutnov
- Neurohlau (Neu Rohlau): Nová Role
- Neu Rothwasser: Nová Červená Voda, p. of Stará Červená Voda
- Neusattel (bei Saaz): Nové Sedlo (Louny District)
- Neusattl:
  - Nové Sedlo (Sokolov District)
  - (an der Naser): Novosedly nad Nežárkou
- Neuschloss: Nové Hrady (Ústí nad Orlicí District)
- Neu Sedlitz: Nové Sedlice
- Neu Serowitz: Nové Syrovice
- Neusiedl:
  - Novosedly (Břeclav District)
  - Novosedly, p. of Kájov
- Neusorge:
  - Nová Starost, p. of Rynoltice
  - Starostín, p. of Meziměstí
- Neuspitzenberg: Nový Špičák, now Boletice MTA*
- Neustadt:
  - Děčín II-Nové Město
  - Nové Město, p. of Karviná
  - Nové Město, p. of Jáchymov
  - Nové Město, p. of Moldava (Teplice District)
- Neustadt an der Tafelfichte: Nové Město pod Smrkem
- Neustadt an der Mettau: Nové Město nad Metují
- Neustadtl:
  - Dolní Bělá
  - Jezvé, p. of Stružnice
  - Nové Městečko, p. of Dlouhá Ves (Klatovy District)
  - Nové Město (Hradec Králové District)
  - Nové Město na Moravě
  - Stráž (Tachov District)
  - Vestřev, now Dolní Olešnice
- Neu Steindorf: Nový Hubenov, now Hubenov
- Neustift:
  - Blatiny, p. of Sněžné (Žďár nad Sázavou District)
  - Lhota, p. of Číměř (Jindřichův Hradec District)
  - Nová Lhota, now Černá v Pošumaví*
  - Nové Sady, p. of Olomouc
  - Polečnice, now Polná na Šumavě
- Neustraschitz: Nové Strašecí
- Neustupow: Neustupov
- Neuthal: Nové Údolí, now Stožec*
- Neutitschein (Neu Titschein): Nový Jičín
- Neu Traubendorf: Nový Hrozenkov
- Neu Tschestin: Nový Čestín, p. of Mochtín
- Neuturkowitz: Nové Dobrkovice, p. of Český Krumlov
- Neu Ullersdorf: Nové Losiny, p. of Jindřichov (Šumperk District)
- Neu Vogelseifen: Nová Rudná, p. of Rudná pod Pradědem
- Neu Waltersdorf: Nové Valteřice, p. of Moravský Beroun
- Neuwelt:
  - Nový Svět, p. of Harrachov
  - Nový Svět, p. of Slatina (Nový Jičín District)
- Neu Wessely (Neuwesseln): Nové Veselí
- Neu Wilmsdorf: Nové Vilémovice, p. of Uhelná
- Neuwirthshaus: Nová Hospoda, p. of Bor (Tachov District)
- Neu Würben: Nové Vrbno, p. of Větřkovice
- Neu Zechsdorf: Nové Těchanovice, p. of Vítkov
- Neu Zedlitsch: Nové Sedliště, p. of Staré Sedliště
- Neu Zerekwe: Nová Cerekev
- Neweklau: Neveklov
- Nezamislitz: Nezamyslice
- Nezdenitz: Nezdenice
- Nezditz (Nestitz): Nezdice na Šumavě
- Nezwiestitz: Nezvěstice
- Nickelsdorf: Mikulovice, p. of Nová Ves v Horách
- Nieder Altstadt: Dolní Staré Město, p. of Trutnov
- Niederbaumgarten: Dolní Pěna
- Nieder Bausow: Dolní Bousov
- Nieder Berzdorf:
  - Dolní Pertoltice, p. of Pertoltice (Liberec District)
  - Dolní Suchá, p. of Hrádek nad Nisou
- Niederbirkicht: Podbřezí
- Nieder Böhmisch Rothwasser: Dolní Čermná
- Nieder Bludowitz: Bludovice, p. of Havířov
- Niederbuseln: Dolní Bušínov, p. of Zábřeh
- Nieder Dattin: Dolní Datyně, p. of Havířov
- Nieder Ebersdorf: Dolní Habartice
- Niederehrenberg: Rumburk 3-Dolní Křečany
- Nieder Einsiedel (Niedereinsiedel): Dolní Poustevna
- Nieder Eisenberg: Dolní Ruda, now Ruda nad Moravou
- Nieder Erlitz: Dolní Orlice, p. of Červená Voda (Ústí nad Orlicí District)
- Nieder Falkenau: Dolní Falknov, p. of Kytlice
- Nieder Forst: Dolní Fořt, p. of Uhelná
- Nieder Georgenthal (Niedergeorgenthal): Dolní Jiřetín, p. of Horní Jiřetín*
- Niedergrund (Nieder Grund):
  - Děčín XIV-Dolní Žleb
  - Dolní Podluží
  - Dolní Údolí, p. of Zlaté Hory
- Nieder Hanichen: Liberec VIII-Dolní Hanychov
- Niederhof: Dolní Dvůr
- Nieder Kalna: Dolní Kalná
- Niederkamnitz: Dolní Kamenice, p. of Česká Kamenice
- Nieder Koblitz: Dolní Chobolice, p. of Liběšice (Litoměřice District)
- Nieder Kreibitz: Dolní Chřibská, p. of Chřibská
- Nieder Krupai (Nieder Gruppei): Dolní Krupá
- Nieder Langenau: Dolní Lánov
- Nieder Leuten: Dolní Lutyně
- Niederleutensdorf: Dolní Litvínov, p. of Litvínov
- Nieder Lichtenwalde: Dolní Světlá, p. of Mařenice
- Niederliebich: Dolní Libchava, p. of Česká Lípa
- Nieder Lindenwiese: Lipová-lázně
- Nieder Marklowitz: Dolní Marklovice, p. of Petrovice u Karviné
- Nieder Mohrau (Niedermohrau):
  - Dolní Morava
  - Dolní Moravice
- Nieder Paulowitz: Dolní Povelice, p. of Bohušov
- Niederpolitz: Dolní Police, p. of Žandov
- Nieder Preschkau: Dolní Prysk, p. of Prysk
- Niederreuth: Dolní Paseky, p. of Aš
- Niederringelberg: Dolní Výšina, p. of Obora (Tachov District)
- Nieder Rochlitz: Dolní Rokytnice, p. of Rokytnice nad Jizerou
- Niedersuchau (Nieder Suchau): Dolní Suchá, p. of Havířov
- Nieder Tierlitzko: Dolní Těrlicko, p. of Těrlicko
- Niederwessig: Dolní Vysoké, p. of Úštěk
- Niederwigstein: Podhradí, p. of Vítkov
- Nieder Wildgrub: Dolní Václavov, p. of Václavov u Bruntálu
- Niedertscherma: Dolní Čermná
- Niederulgersdorf: Děčín VIII-Dolní Oldřichov
- Niederullersdorf: Dolní Oldřiš, p. of Bulovka
- Niederwald: Dolní Les, p. of Vlčice (Jeseník District)
- Niederzukau: Dolní Žukov, p. of Český Těšín
- Niemes: Mimoň
- Niemsching: Němče, p. of Větřní
- Niemtschau: Němčany, p. of Krásný Dvůr
- Niemtschitz:
  - Němčice (Blansko District)
  - Němčice (Kolín District)
  - Němčice (Kroměříž District)
  - Němčice (Pardubice District)
  - Němčice (Prachatice District)
  - Němčice (Strakonice District)
- Nikl: Mikuleč
- Niklasberg: Mikulov (Teplice District)
- Niklasdorf: Mikulovice (Jeseník District)
- Nikles: Raškov, p. of Bohdíkov
- Niklowitz:
  - Mikolajice
  - Mikulovice (Znojmo District)
- Nikolsburg: Mikulov
- Nimburg: Nymburk
- Nimlau: Nemilany, p. of Olomouc
- Nimvorgut: Nuzarov, now Postřekov*
- Ninowitz: Jinonice
- Nirschlern: Koryta, now Rožmitál na Šumavě*
- Nischburg: Nižbor
- Nischkau: Nížkov
- Nitschenau: Lhotka, p. of Vítkov
- Nitzau: Nicov
- Niwnitz: Nivnice
- Nixdorf: Mikulášovice
- Nollendorf: Nakléřov, now Petrovice (Ústí nad Labem District)
- Nonnengrün: Hluboká, p. of Milhostov
- Nowakowitz: Novákovice, p. of Lomec
- Nudelbaum: Modlibohov, p. of Český Dub
- Nürnberg: Norberčany
- Nürschan (Nyrschan): Nýřany
- Nuserau: Nuzerov, p. of Sušice
- Nußlau: Nosislav

== O ==
- Ober Altstadt: Horní Staré Město, p. of Trutnov
- Oberbaumgarten: Horní Pěna
- Ober Berschkowitz: Horní Beřkovice
- Ober Berzdorf: Liberec XXII-Horní Suchá
- Oberberzdorf: Horní Pertoltice, p. of Pertoltice (Liberec District)
- Ober Betschwa: Horní Bečva
- Ober Birken (Ober Bris): Horní Bříza
- Ober Bludowitz: Horní Bludovice
- Ober Böhmisch Rothwasser: Horní Čermná
- Ober Borry: Horní Bory, p. of Bory (Žďár nad Sázavou District)
- Ober Brand: Horní Žďár, p. of Ostrov (Karlovy Vary District)
- Ober Breitenstein: Horní Třebonín, p. of Dolní Třebonín
- Ober Dannowitz: Horní Dunajovice
- Ober Dattin: Horní Datyně, p. of Vratimov
- Ober Domaslowitz: Horní Domaslavice
- Oberdorf:
  - Horní Ves, now Chomutov
  - Horní Ves, p. of Litvínov
  - Horní Ves, p. of Trstěnice (Cheb District)
- Ober Dubenky (Ober Dubenken): Horní Dubenky
- Ober Ebersdorf: Horní Habartice
- Ober Eisenberg: Horní Ruda, now Ruda nad Moravou
- Ober Einsiedel (Obereinsiedel): Horní Poustevna, p. of Dolní Poustevna
- Ober Ellgoth (Oberellgoth): Horní Lhota (Ostrava-City District)
- Ober Erlitz: Horní Orlice, p. of Červená Voda (Ústí nad Orlicí District)
- Ober Forst: Horní Fořt, p. of Uhelná
- Oberfröschau: Horní Břečkov
- Ober Gallitsch: Horní Kaliště, now Dolní Dvořiště*
- Obergeorgenthal: Horní Jiřetín
- Ober Gerpitz: Brno-Horní Heršpice
- Obergoß: Horní Kosov, p. of Jihlava
- Ober Gosolup: Horní Kozolupy
- Ober Gostitz: Horní Hoštice, p. of Javorník (Jeseník District)
- Obergramling: Horní Kramolín, p. of Teplá
- Obergrund:
  - Děčín XI-Horní Žleb
  - Horní Podluží
  - Horní Údolí, p. of Zlaté Hory
- Ober Kochet: Kochánov, p. of Hartmanice (Klatovy District)
- Ober Krupai (Ober Gruppei): Horní Krupá, p. of Ralsko
- Oberhäuser: Rohy, now Brloh (Český Krumlov District)
- Oberhaid (Ober Haid):
  - Horní Dvořiště
  - Zbytiny
- Ober Hammer: Hoření Hamr, now Velké Hamry
- Ober Hanichen: Liberec XIX-Horní Hanychov
- Oberheidisch: Horní Hedeč, p. of Králíky
- Ober Heinzendorf: Horní Hynčina, p. of Pohledy
- Oberhennersdorf: Rumburk 2-Horní Jindřichov
- Ober Hermsdorf: Horní Heřmanice, p. of Bernartice (Jeseník District)
- Oberhof: Nový Dvůr, p. of Zdíkov
- Ober Hohenelbe: Hořejší Vrchlabí, p. of Vrchlabí
- Ober Hrachowitz: Dolní Hrachovice
- Ober Jeleni (Ober Jeleny): Horní Jelení
- Ober-Johnsdorf: Horní Třešňovec
- Oberkamnitz: Horní Kamenice, p. of Česká Kamenice
- Oberklee: Soběchleby, p. of Blšany
- Ober Koblitz: Horní Chobolice, p. of Liběšice (Litoměřice District)
- Oberkörnsalz: Hořejší Krušec, p. of Hartmanice (Klatovy District)
- Ober Kozolup: Horní Kozolupy
- Ober Kralowitz: Horní Kralovice, now Loket (Benešov District)*
- Ober Kreibitz: Horní Chřibská, p. of Chřibská
- Ober Langenau: Horní Lánov, p. of Lánov
- Ober Langendorf: Horní Dlouhá, now Malšín
- Oberlangendorf: Horní Dlouhá Loučka, now Dlouhá Loučka (Olomouc District)
- Oberleutensdorf (Oberleitensdorf): Horní Litvínov, p. of Litvínov
- Ober Lhotta: Horní Lhota (Zlín District)
- Ober Lichtenwalde: Horní Světlá, p. of Mařenice
- Oberlichtbuchet: Horní Světlé Hory, now Strážný*
- Ober Lindewiese: Horní Lipová, p. of Lipová-lázně
- Ober Litsch: Horní Lideč
- Ober Lohma (Oberlohma): Horní Lomany, p. of Františkovy Lázně
- Oberlosau: Horní Lažany, p. of Lipová (Cheb District)
- Obermarkschlag: Horní Hraničná, now Přední Výtoň*
- Ober Maxdorf: Horní Maxov, p. of Lučany nad Nisou
- Obermohrau: Horní Morava, p. of Dolní Morava
- Obermoldau: Horní Vltavice
- Ober Moschtienitz: Horní Moštěnice
- Oberndorf: Horní Ves, p. of Třebeň
- Ober Neuern: Horní Nýrsko, now Nýrsko
- Ober Neugrün: Horní Nivy, p. of Dolní Nivy
- Ober Niemtsch: Horní Němčí
- Ober Niemtschitz: Horní Němčice
- Obernitz: Obrnice
- Ober Oggold: Horní Okolí, now Malšín*
- Ober Paulowitz: Horní Povelice, p. of Liptaň
- Oberplan: Horní Planá
- Ober Potschernitz: Prague 20-Horní Počernice
- Oberpolitz: Horní Police
- Ober Prausnitz: Horní Brusnice
- Ober Preschkau: Horní Prysk, p. of Prysk
- Oberpriesen: Vysoké Březno, p. of Malé Březno (Most District)
- Oberreuth: Horní Paseky, p. of Aš
- Oberringelberg: Horní Výšina, p. of Halže
- Ober Rosenthal: Liberec VII-Horní Růžodol
- Ober Roschlitz: Horní Rokytnice, p. of Rokytnice nad Jizerou
- Ober Rotschau (Ober Rotschow): Horní Ročov, now Ročov
- Obersablat: Horní Záblatí, p. of Záblatí (Prachatice District)
- Ober Sandau: Horní Žandov, p. of Dolní Žandov
- Oberschaar: Žáry, p. of Město Albrechtice
- Oberschlag: Milešice, now Volary
- Oberschlagl: Horní Drkolná, now Vyšší Brod*
- Oberschneedorf: Horní Snežná, now Volary*
- Oberschön: Dolní Dvory, p. of Cheb
- Oberschönbach: Horní Luby, p. of Luby (Cheb District)
- Oberschönhub: Horní Přísahov, now Vyšší Brod*
- Ober Schossenreuth: Horní Částkov, p. of Habartov
- Ober Schwarzbrunn: Horní Černá Studnice, p. of Nová Ves nad Nisou
- Ober Sekerschan (Ober Sekrzan): Horní Sekyřany, p. of Heřmanova Huť
- Obersinetschlag: Horní Příbrání, now Pohorská Ves*
- Ober Stankau: Horní Stankov, p. of Hlavňovice
- Obersteindörfl: Zbraslav, now Dolní Dvořiště*
- Ober Studenetz: Horní Studenec, p. of Ždírec nad Doubravou
- Obersuchau (Ober Suchau): Horní Suchá
- Oberteschau: Hořejší Těšov, p. of Hartmanice (Klatovy District)
- Ober Tierlitzko: Horní Těrlicko, p. of Těrlicko
- Obertor: Horní Brána, p. of Český Krumlov
- Ober Toschonowitz: Horní Tošanovice
- Oberulgersdorf: Děčín XXI-Horní Oldřichov
- Ober Uresch: Horní Ureš, now Přední Výtoň*
- Obervollmau: Horní Folmava, p. of Česká Kubice
- Ober Wernersdorf: Horní Vernéřovice, now Jívka
- Oberwessig: Horní Vysoké, p. of Levín
- Ober Wigstein: Dubová, now Radkov (Opava District)
- Ober Wildgrub: Horní Václavov, p. of Václavov u Bruntálu
- Ober Wisternitz: Horní Věstonice
- Ober Dreihöfen: Horní Záhoří, p. of Lubenec
- Oberzassau: Horní Cazov, now Stožec*
- Ober Zerekwe (Ober Cerekwe): Horní Cerekev
- Oberzukau: Horní Žukov, p. of Český Těšín
- Oberzwinzen: Horní Svince, p. of Dolní Třebonín
- Obeschitz: Brno-Sobešice
- Obetznitz: Obecnice
- Oblas: Oblekovice, p. of Znojmo
- Obodersch: Benátky nad Jizerou III
- Obristwy: Obříství
- Obrowitz: Brno-Zábrdovice
- Ochsensthall: Volárna, p. of Roudno
- Oder: Odra (river)
- Oderberg: Bohumín
- Oderfurt: Přívoz, p. of Ostrava
- Odersch: Oldřišov
- Odolenswasser: Odolena Voda
- Odrau: Odry
- Oed: Poustka
- Oels: Olešnice (Blansko District)
- Oels-Döberney: Debrné, p. of Mostek (Trutnov District)
- Oemau: Soběnov
- Ogfolderhaid: Jablonec, now Boletice MTA*
- Öhlhütten:
  - Lhota u Konice, p. of Brodek u Konice
  - Lhotka u Litultovic
- Ohorn: Javorná, p. of Bražec
- Ohrad: Ohrada, p. of Bílovec
- Ohren: Javory, p. of Malšovice
- Ohrensdorf: Střítež nad Ludinou
- Ohrnes: Javoří, p. of Maletín
- Okenau: Okounov
- Okrzischko (Okrischko, Okrizko): Okříšky
- Okrouhlík: Mělník
- Okrauhlitz: Okrouhlice
- Ölberg (Oelberg): Olivětín, p. of Broumov
- Olbersdorf:
  - Albrechtice (Ústí nad Orlicí District)
  - Albrechtice u Frýdlantu, p. of Frýdlant
  - Albrechtice u Rýmařova, p. of Břidličná
  - Město Albrechtice
- Olbramowitz: Olbramovice u Votic
- Olchowitz:
  - Oldřichovice (Zlín District)
  - Oldřichovice, p. of Dešenice
- Olhotta (Ollhotta): Lhota, p. of Úštěk
- Olleschau: Olšany (Šumperk District)
- Olmütz: Olomouc
- Olschan: Olšany (Vyškov District)
- Olschi (Olschy): Olší (Brno-Country District)
- Ölstadtl: Olejovice, now Libavá MTA*
- Ömau (Oemau): Soběnov
- Ondregow: Ondřejov (Pelhřimov District)
- Ondrejow: Ondřejov (Prague-East District)
- Ondschikowitz: Ondříkovice, p. of Frýdštejn
- Opatowitz (Oppatowitz):
  - Opatovice nad Labem
  - Velké Opatovice
- Opolau: Úpohlavy
- Opotschna: Opočno (Louny District)
- Opotschno: Opočno (Rychnov nad Kněžnou District)
- Oppa: Opava (river)
- Oppahof: Dvořisko, p. of Kravaře
- Oppatau: Opatov (Třebíč District)
- Oppau: Zábřeh, p. of Dolní Benešov
- Oppelitz: Opolenec, p. of Kašperské Hory
- Oppolz: Tichá, p. of Dolní Dvořiště
- Orlau: Orlová
- Orlowitz: Orlovice
- Orpus: Mezilesí, p. of Kryštofovy Hamry
- Oschelin: Ošelín
- Oschitz: Osečná
- Oskau: Oskava
- Oslawan: Oslavany
- Ossegg: Osek (Teplice District)
- Ossek: Osek nad Bečvou
- Oßnitz: Sosnice, now Dolní Dvořiště*
- Ossowa Bittischka: Osová Bítýška
- Ostrau:
  - Ostrava
  - Ostrov, p. of Bor (Tachov District)
  - Ostrov, p. of Žďárec
  - Ostrov u Stříbra, p. of Kostelec (Tachov District)
- Ostrosen: Ostružno, p. of Nezdice na Šumavě
- Oswitiman: Osvětimany
- Otrokowitz: Otrokovice
- Otrotschin: Otročín, p. of Stříbro
- Ottau: Zátoň, p. of Větřní
- Otten: Otín (Jihlava District)
- Ottendorf:
  - Otice
  - Otovice (Náchod District)
- Ottengrün: Otov
- Ottenreuth: Otín, p. of Planá
- Ottenschlag:
  - Dluhoště, p. of Benešov nad Černou
  - Otín, p. of Jindřichův Hradec
  - Otov, now Přední Výtoň*
- Ottetstift: Otice, p. of Polná na Šumavě
- Ottnitz: Otnice
- Ottowitz: Otovice (Karlovy Vary District)
- Oxbrunn: Březovík, p. of Ktiš

== P ==
- Pabelsdorf: Pavlíkov, p. of Třemešné
- Padloschin: Podlešín, p. of Stebno
- Palitz: Palič, p. of Lipová (Cheb District)
- Palkowitz: Palkovice
- Palzendorf: Palačov, p. of Starý Jičín
- Pamferhütte: Pamferova Huť, now Železná Ruda
- Panditz: Bantice
- Panzer: Pancíř, p. of Železná Ruda
- Pappelsdorf: Topolná
- Parchen: Prácheň, p. of Kamenický Šenov
- Pardorf: Bavory
- Pardubitz: Pardubice
- Parfuß: Brno-Bosonohy
- Parisau: Pařezov
- Parkfried: Bělá, p. of Nová Pec
- Parlosa: Brložec, p. of Dobrná
- Parnig (Parnik): Parník, p. of Česká Třebová
- Parschnitz: Poříčí, p. of Trutnov
- Parschowitz: Paršovice
- Partschendorf: Bartošovice
- Paschtik: Paštiky
- Paskau: Paskov
- Paslas: Bohuslav, p. of Teplá
- Paß: Horní Sedlo, p. of Hrádek nad Nisou
- Passek: Paseka (Olomouc District)
- Passeken: Paseka, p. of Borová Lada
- Passern: Pasovary, now Světlík*
- Paßnau: Veselov, p. of Žlutice
- Pastreichs: Hradišťko, p. of Dačice
- Patokrey: Patokryje
- Pattersdorf: Bartoušov
- Patzau: Pacov
- Patzin: Pačín, p. of Bezdružice
- Paulowitz: Pavlovičky, p. of Olomouc
- Paulus: Miletínky, p. of Ktiš
- Paulusbrunn: Pavlův Studenec, now Obora (Tachov District)*
- Pauska: Poustka, p. of Dobkovice
- Pausram: Pouzdřany
- Pauten: Poutnov, p. of Teplá
- Pawinow: Palvinov, p. of Hartmanice (Klatovy District)
- Pawlikow: Pavlíkov
- Pawlow: Pavlov (Šumperk District)
- Pawlowitz:
  - Pavlovice, p. of Planá
  - Pavlovice u Kojetína
  - Pavlovice u Přerova
- Payreschau: Boršov nad Vltavou
- Pechbach: Smolná, p. of Rotava
- Pechöfen: Smolné Pece
- Peichsdorf: Piskořov, p. of Město Albrechtice
- Peiperz: Děčín XVI-Přípeř
- Pelechow: Pelechov, p. of Železný Brod
- Pelkowitz: Pelkovice, p. of Rychnov u Jablonce nad Nisou
- Permesgrün: Květnová, p. of Ostrov (Karlovy Vary District)
- Petzka: Pecka
- Pelechen: Pelechy
- Penketitz: Beníkovice, now Boletice MTA*
- Perletschlag: Perlovice, p. of Prachatice
- Perlsberg: Lazy, p. of Lázně Kynžvart
- Pern: Beroun, p. of Teplá
- Pernartitz: Bernartice, p. of Stráž (Tachov District)
- Pernlesdorf: Mostky, p. of Kaplice
- Perutz: Peruc
- Perschetitz: Horní Brzotice, now Boletice MTA*
- Peterbach: Petrov, now Polná na Šumavě*
- Petersburg: Petrohrad
- Petersdorf:
  - Hraničné Petrovice
  - Petrovice (Bruntál District)
  - Petrovice, p. of Jablonné v Podještědí
  - Petrovice, p. of Skorošice
  - Vražné
- Petersdorf an der Tess: Petrov nad Desnou
- Petershofen: Petřkovice, p. of Ostrava
- Petersin: Petříkov
- Peterswald:
  - Petříkov, p. of Ostružná
  - Petrovice (Ústí nad Labem District)
  - Petřvald (Karviná District)
- Petlarn: Žebráky, p. of Hošťka
- Petrowitz:
  - Petrovice (Blansko District)
  - Petrovice (Příbram District)
  - Petrovice (Rakovník District)
  - Petrovice, p. of Malé Svatoňovice
  - Petrovice, p. of Puklice
  - Petrovice, p. of Štoky
  - Petrovice u Sušice
  - Pustějov
- Petrowitz an der Angel: Petrovice nad Úhlavou, p. of Janovice nad Úhlavou
- Petrowitz bei Freistadt: Petrovice u Karviné
- Petrzkowitz:
  - Petřkovice, p. of Ostrava
  - Petřkovice, p. of Starý Jičín
- Petschau: Bečov nad Teplou
- Petschek (Petschkau): Pečky
- Petzer: Pec pod Sněžkou
- Petzka: Pecka
- Pfaffendorf:
  - Děčín XXIII-Popovice
  - Kněžská, p. of Šlapanov
  - Přísečno, p. of Soběnov
- Pfaffengrün: Popovice, p. of Teplá
- Pfaffenschlag: Bobovec, now Světlík*
- Pfauendorf: Pávov, p. of Jihlava
- Pfefferschlag: Libínské Sedlo, p. of Prachatice
- Pflanzen: Blansko, p. of Kaplice
- Pflanzendorf: Hřivčice, p. of Peruc
- Pflaumendörfl: Milonice (Vyškov District)
- Pföhlwies: Lužná, p. of Kopřivná
- Pfraumberg (Pfrauenberg): Přimda
- Pher: Pchery
- Philippsberg:
  - Filipov, p. of Česká Kamenice
  - Filipov, p. of Jiříkov
  - Filipova Hora, p. of Tlumačov (Domažlice District)
  - Filipovice, p. of Bělá pod Pradědem
  - Filipovice, p. of Hradec nad Moravicí
- Philippsgrund: Filipka, p. of Oldřichov v Hájích
- Philippshütte: Filipova Huť, p. of Modrava
- Philippsthal:
  - Filipová, p. of Loučná nad Desnou
  - Filipovka, p. of Višňová (Liberec District)
- Pibrans: Příbram
- Pickau: Býkov, p. of Býkov-Láryšov
- Pichelberg: Boučí, p. of Dolní Nivy
- Pichlern: Pihlov, now Horní Planá
- Pientschin: Pěnčín (Liberec District)
- Piesling: Písečné
- Pießnig: Písečná, p. of Česká Lípa
- Pihanken: Běhánky, p. of Dubí
- Pilgram: Pelhřimov
- Pilkau: Bílka, p. of Bořislav
- Pilletitz: Bílovice, now Boletice MTA*
- Pilmersreuth: Pelhřimov, p. of Cheb
- Pilnikau: Pilníkov
- Pilsen: Plzeň
- Pilsenschlag: Polžov, now Pohorská Ves*
- Pingetschlag: Skalné, now Hořice na Šumavě*
- Pinke: Benkov, p. of Uničov
- Pintschei: Pěnčín (Jablonec nad Nisou District)
- Pirk: Bříza, p. of Cheb
- Pirkau: Březí, p. of Ctiboř (Tachov District)
- Pirken: Březenec, p. of Jirkov
- Pirkenhammer: Březová (Karlovy Vary District)
- Pirnik: Brníčko, p. of Uničov
- Pirnitz: Brtnice
- Pirten: Brť, p. of Otročín
- Pischel: Pyšel
- Pischely: Pyšely
- Pischtin: Pištín
- Pisek: Písek
- Pistau:
  - Pístov, p. of Chodová Planá
  - Pístov, p. of Jihlava
- Pistowitz: Pístovice, p. of Račice-Pístovice
- Pitschkowitz: Býčkovice
- Pittarn: Pitárné, p. of Vysoká (Bruntál District)
- Pittling: Pytlíkov, p. of Bžany (Teplice District)
- Piwana: Pňovany
- Piwin: Pivín
- Piwonin: Pivonín, p. of Zábřeh
- Piwonitz: Pivonice, p. of Bystřice nad Pernštejnem
- Plaben: Plav
- Pladen: Blatno (Louny District)
- Plahetschlag: Blažejovice, p. of Zbytiny
- Plahow: Bláhov, p. of Homole u Panny
- Plan:
  - Planá (České Budějovice District)
  - Planá
- Plan an der Lainsitz: Planá nad Lužnicí
- Planer Brand: Žďár, p. of Chodský Újezd
- Planian (Planan): Plaňany
- Planitz: Plánice
- Plankus: Planská, now Chroboly*
- Planles: Plánička, p. of Černá v Pošumaví
- Plas (Platz): Stráž nad Nežárkou
- Plas (Plass): Plazy
- Plaß: Plasy
- Plaßdorf: Blahuňov, p. of Místo
- Plassendorf: Kubička, now Česká Kubice*
- Platsch: Plaveč (Znojmo District)
- Platten:
  - Blatná, p. of Frymburk
  - Blatno (Chomutov District)
  - Horní Blatná
- Plattetschlag: Mladoňov, now Boletice MTA*
- Plattorn: Platoř, p. of Dlouhá Ves (Klatovy District)
- Platz: Místo
- Platz an der Naser: Stráž nad Nežárkou
- Plauschnitz: Ploužnice, p. of Ralsko
- Plaw: Plavy
- Pleil-Sorgenthal: Černý Potok, p. of Kryštofovy Hamry
- Pleschowitz: Plešovice, p. of Zlatá Koruna
- Pleßberg: Plešivec (mountain)
- Pleßna: Plesná, p. of Ostrava
- Plichtitz: Plichtice, p. of Zavlekov
- Plöckenstein: Plechý (mountain)
- Plöß:
  - Pláně, p. of Všeruby (Domažlice District)
  - Pleš, p. of Bělá nad Radbuzou
- Ploscha: Blažim (Louny District)
- Ploschkowitz: Ploskovice
- Plotischt: Plotiště nad Labem, p. of Hradec Králové
- Plötsch: Plechy, p. of Nový Malín
- Plowitz: Blovice
- Pluhow (Pluhowy Zdiar): Pluhův Žďár
- Plumberg: Květná, p. of Krajková
- Plumenau (Plumau): Plumlov
- Pobitz: Babice, p. of Teplá
- Pobutsch: Pobučí, p. of Jestřebí (Šumperk District)
- Pochlowitz: Dolní Pochlovice, p. of Kynšperk nad Ohří
- Pochmühl:
  - Pocheň, p. of Brumovice (Opava District)
  - Pocheň, p. of Široká Niva
- Pöcken: Pěkovice, p. of Teplá
- Podersam: Podbořany
- Podesdorf: Bohdalovice
- Podhorschan:
  - Podhořany, p. of Nelahozeves
  - Podhořany u Ronova
- Podiebrad: Poděbrady
- Podleß: Podlesí (Příbram District)
- Podletitz: Podlesice, p. of Veliká Ves (Chomutov District)
- Podol:
  - Bílé Podolí
  - Podolí, now Svijany
  - Prague-Podolí
  - Vápenný Podol
- Podoly: Podolí, p. of Prachatice
- Podrasnitz: Podražnice
- Podseditz: Podsedice
- Podwihof: Podvihov, p. of Opava
- Podwurst: Podvoří, now Boletice MTA*
- Pograth: Podhrad, p. of Cheb
- Pohl: Polom (Přerov District)
- Pohled (Pochled): Pohleď
- Pohlem: Polom, p. of Bochov
- Pohlen: Spolí, p. of Přídolí
- Pohrlitz: Pohořelice
- Pohorsch:
  - Pohoř, p. of Odry
  - Pohořany, p. of Dolany (Olomouc District)
- Pohorschan: Pohořany, p. of Žitenice
- Pohorz: Pohoří, p. of Malečov
- Pokatitz: Pokutice, p. of Kadaň
- Pokau: Bukov, p. of Ústí nad Labem
- Pokratitz: Pokratice, p. of Litoměřice
- Polanka an der Oder: Polanka nad Odrou, p. of Ostrava
- Polaun: Polubný, p. of Kořenov
- Polehraditz (Pollehraditz): Boleradice
- Polep (Polepp): Polepy (Litoměřice District)
- Polerad:
  - Polerady (Most District)
  - Polerady (Prague-East District)
- Poliken: Políkno, p. of Toužim
- Polin (Pollin): Poleň
- Politschka: Polička
- Politz an der Mettau: Police nad Metují
- Politz an der Elbe: Děčín XXXII-Boletice nad Labem
- Polke: Polka, p. of Vápenná
- Pollaitz: Police (Šumperk District)
- Pollein: Palonín
- Pollerskirchen: Úsobí
- Polleschowitz (Poleschowitz): Polešovice
- Polletitz (Poletitz, Bolletitz): Boletice, p. of Kájov
- Polna: Polná
- Polnisch Leuten: Lutyně, p. of Orlová
- Polnisch Ostrau: Polská Ostrava, now Ostrava
- Polschitz (Pollschitz): Dolní Polžice, p. of Bezdružice
- Polzen: Ploučnice (river)
- Pomeisl: Nepomyšl
- Pomitsch: Podmyče
- Pömmerle (Pömerle): Povrly
- Pomuk: Nepomuk
- Ponikla: Poniklá
- Popelin: Popelín
- Popow: Popov, p. of Štítná nad Vláří-Popov
- Popowitz (Poppowitz):
  - Popovice (Brno-Country District)
  - Popovice (Uherské Hradiště District)
- Poppitz:
  - Popice
  - Popice, p. of Jihlava
  - Popice, p. of Znojmo
- Poppowa: Popov, p. of Kostelec (Tachov District)
- Poremba: Poruba, p. of Orlová
- Porenz: Beranovec, p. of Suchá
- Poric (an der Sazawa): Poříčí nad Sázavou
- Poritsch: Poříčí, p. of Chyše
- Poritschan (Porican): Poříčany
- Poritschen (Poritschen/Desfours): Spálené Poříčí
- Porschitz (Porzitsch): Poříčí, p. of Boršov nad Vltavou
- Porschitz an der Sasau: Poříčí nad Sázavou
- Poruba: Poruba, p. of Ostrava
- Poschau: Bošov, p. of Vrbice (Karlovy Vary District)
- Poschetzau: Božičany
- Poschitz: Poseč, p. of Otročín
- Poschkau: Boškov, p. of Potštát
- Poschlag: Pošlák, now Vyšší Brod*
- Pösigl: Bezděkov, now Boletice MTA*
- Posluchau: Posluchov, p. of Hlubočky
- Posoritz: Pozořice
- Possigkau: Postřekov
- Pössigkau: Bezděkov, p. of Třemešné
- Possitz: Božice
- Postelberg: Postoloprty
- Postitz: Božtěšice, p. of Ústí nad Labem
- Postrum: Postřelná, p. of Jablonné v Podještědí
- Postupitz: Postupice
- Potfohre (Potfuhre): Potvorov
- Potschapl: Počaply, p. of Terezín
- Potschatek: Počátky
- Potscherad: Počerady, p. of Výškov
- Pottenstein: Potštejn
- Potzen: Práčov, p. of Přídolí
- Powel: Povel, p. of Olomouc
- Pozdiechow (Pozdechow, Posdiechow): Pozděchov
- Prachatitz: Prachatice
- Prachnian: Staré Práchňany, p. of Čechtice
- Prag: Praha
- Pragerstift: Pražačka, now Boletice MTA*
- Prahlitz: Pravlov
- Pramles: Branná, now Malšín
- Praschno Augesd: Prašný Újezd, p. of Mlečice
- Praschma: Pražmo
- Praskoles: Praskolesy
- Praskowitz: Prackovice nad Labem
- Praslawitz: Přáslavice
- Prasseditz: Prosetice, p. of Teplice
- Praßles: Zbraslav, p. of Štědrá
- Pratzen: Prace
- Prause: Brusov, p. of Úštěk
- Prawonin: Pravonín
- Prchalau: Prchalov, p. of Příbor
- Predmeritz (an der Elbe): Předměřice nad Labem
- Predslaw: Předslav
- Predwojowitz: Předvojovice, p. of Čachrov
- Preitenhof Plandry
- Prelautsch: Přelouč
- Premyslowitz (Przemislowitz): Přemyslovice
- Prerau: Přerov
- Preschen: Břešťany, now Bílina*
- Preschkau: Prysk
- Presel: Březiny, p. of Malečov
- Pressnitz: Přísečnice, now Kryštofovy Hamry*
- Prestawlk: Přestavlky (Chrudim District)
- Prestein: Přestání, p. of Štědrá
- Prestitz: Přeštice
- Pribram (Przibram): Příbram
- Prichowitz: Příchovice, p. of Kořenov
- Priedlanz: Předlánce, p. of Višňová (Liberec District)
- Priesen:
  - Březno (Chomutov District)
  - Březno, p. of Postoloprty
- Priesern: Přízeř, p. of Rožmberk nad Vltavou
- Priesten (Pristen): Přestanov
- Priethal: Přídolí
- Primislau: Přibyslav
- Primiswald: Přemyslov, p. of Loučná nad Desnou
- Prisnitz: Přísečná
- Priwoz: Přívoz, p. of Ostrava
- Probolden: Provodice, p. of Hořice na Šumavě
- Proboscht: Proboštov, p. of Malečov
- Probstau: Proboštov
- Prochomuth: Prachomety, p. of Toužim
- Pröding: Předín
- Prödlas: Brodce, p. of Kadaň
- Prödlitz:
  - Brodek u Prostějova
  - Předlice, p. of Ústí nad Labem
- Pröhlig: Přívlaky, p. of Žiželice (Louny District)
- Prohn: Braňany
- Prohor: Prohoř, p. of Štědrá
- Pröles: Přílezy, p. of Útvina
- Pröllas: Brody, p. of Krásný Dvůr
- Promenhof: Broumov (Tachov District)
- Prösau: Březová (Sokolov District)
- Prosau: Mrázov, p. of Teplá
- Prosanken: Brozánky, p. of Řehlovice
- Proschwitz an der Neiße: Proseč nad Nisou, p. of Jablonec nad Nisou
- Prosetsch: Proseč
- Prositschka: Prosíčka, p. of Koberovy
- Proskowitz: Proskovice, p. of Ostrava
- Prosseln: Prosetín, p. of Dobkovice
- Prossenitz: Prosenice
- Prossmeritz: Prosiměřice
- Prossnitz:
  - Prostějov
  - (Prosnitz): Vražice, now Boletice MTA*
- Prostiowiczek: Prostějovičky
- Protiwanow: Protivanov
- Protiwin: Protivín
- Protowitz: Protivec, p. of Žlutice
- Prostibor: Prostiboř
- Prstna: Prstná, p. of Petrovice u Karviné
- Pruhonitz: Průhonice
- Prünles: Studenec, p. of Oloví
- Prusinowitz: Prusinovice
- Prussinowitz: Ranošov, now Kozlov (Olomouc District)*
- Przestawelk (Pschestawilk): Přestavlky (Přerov District)
- Przikas (Pschikas): Příkazy
- Pschan: Blšany u Loun
- Pschelautsch: Přelouč
- Pschestitz: Přeštice
- Pschislowitz: Březovice
- Pschiwosten: Přívozec, p. of Blížejov
- Pschoblik: Pšovlky
- Pstruschi: Pstruží
- Ptin: Ptení
- Pudageln: Budákov, p. of Dolní Dvořiště
- Pudlau: Pudlov, p. of Bohumín
- Puklitz: Puklice
- Pulgram: Bulhary (Břeclav District)
- Pulletschney: Pulečný
- Pullitz: Police (Třebíč District)
- Pullwitz: Pulovice, p. of Šemnice
- Pulpetzen: Půlpecen, p. of Chrastavec
- Pumperle: Řasnice, p. of Strážný
- Punkendorf: Boňkov, p. of Olšovec
- Punnau: Boněnov, p. of Chodová Planá
- Pürgles: Hrádek, p. of Krajková
- Pürglitz: Křivoklát
- Pürkau: Tvrdkov
- Purkratitz: Purkratice, p .of Písek
- Pürles: Brložec, p. of Štědrá
- Pürstein: Perštejn
- Pürstling: Březník, now Modrava
- Puritschen: Kvasov, now Rožmitál na Šumavě*
- Purschau: Pořejov, now Hošťka*
- Pusch: Buč, p. of Bezvěrov
- Puschwitz: Buškovice, p. of Podbořany
- Puskowetz: Pustkovec, p. of Ostrava
- Pustimir (Pustomirz): Pustiměř
- Putkau: Putkov, p. of Zdíkov
- Putschirn: Počerny, p. of Karlovy Vary
- Putzeried: Pocinovice
- Putzlitz: Puclice
- Pyschcz: Píšť (Opava District)

== Q ==
- Qualen: Chvalov, p. of Stebno
- Qualisch: Chvaleč
- Quetusch (Kwietusch): Květuš, p. of Chyšky
- Quikau: Kvítkov, p. of Modlany
- Quinau: Květnov, p. of Blatno (Chomutov District)
- Quintenthal: Vizov, now Žacléř
- Quitosching: Květušín, p. of Polná na Šumavě
- Quittein: Květín, p. of Mohelnice
- Quittendorf: Metylovice
- Quitkau: Kvítkov

== R ==
- Raabe: Hrabová (Šumperk District)
- Raase: Razová
- Rabenhütte: Havránka, now Horní Vltavice*
- Rabenseifen: Hraběšice
- Rabenstein an der Schnella: Rabštejn nad Střelou, p. of Manětín
- Rabenau: Hrabenov, p. of Ruda nad Moravou
- Rabersdorf: Hrabišín
- Rabitz: Hrabice, p. of Vimperk
- Rabus: Raveň, p. of Střítež (Český Krumlov District)
- Raby (Rabi): Rabí
- Rachel: Rokle
- Rad: Kluč, p. of Habartov
- Radaun: Radouň, p. of Štětí
- Radetitz: Radětice (Příbram District)
- Radhoscht:
  - Radhošť (Ústí nad Orlicí District)
  - (Radegast): Radhošť (mountain)
- Radigau: Radechov, p. of Radonice (Chomutov District)
- Radikau: Radíkov, p. of Olomouc
- Radimowitz:
  - Radimovice u Tábora
  - Radimovice u Želče
- Radinetschlag: Radčice, p. of Malonty
- Rading: Radyně, p. of Toužim
- Radischen: Hradiště, p. of Kaplice
- Radl: Rádlo
- Radmühl: Radomilov, p. of Ruda nad Moravou
- Radnitz:
  - Radnice
  - Radnice, p. of Pavlov (Šumperk District)
- Radobil: Radobýl
- Radomischl: Radomyšl
- Radonitz: Radonice (Chomutov District)
- Radoschowitz: Radošovice (České Budějovice District)
- Radostin: Radostín, p. of Sychrov (Liberec District)
- Radostitz: Radhostice
- Radotin: Radotín, p. of Chyše
- Radschau: Račov, p. of Zdíkov
- Radschitz: Radčice
- Radschowitz: Hradcovice
- Radun: Raduň
- Radwanitz:
  - Radvanice, p. of Ostrava
  - Radvanice, p. of Velhartice
- Radzein: Radejčín, p. of Řehlovice
- Ragersdorf: Malý Radkov, p. of Hartmanice (Klatovy District)
- Raigern: Rajhrad
- Rail: Rájec, p. of Přimda
- Rainochowitz: Rajnochovice
- Raitz: Rájec, p. of Borovnice (Rychnov nad Kněžnou District)
- Raitza: Rájec, now Tisá
- Rakonitz: Rakovník
- Rakschitz: Rakšice, p. of Moravský Krumlov
- Rampusch: Rampuše, p. of Liberk
- Ramsau: Ramzová, p. of Ostružná
- Ranigsdorf: Linhartice
- Rankwotz: Rankovice, p. of Teplá
- Ranna: Raná (Chrudim District)
- Ranzern: Rančířov
- Rapitz: Vrapice, p. of Kladno
- Rapotitz: Rapotice
- Rappetschlag: Rapotice, p. of Malonty
- Rascha: Rašov, p. of Klíny
- Raschen: Rašovka, p. of Šimonovice
- Raschowitz: Rašovice, p. of Úštěk
- Rasitz: Razice, p. of Hrobčice
- Raspenau: Raspenava
- Ratais an der Sasau (Rataj): Rataje nad Sázavou
- Rathgebern: Radkov
- Ratischkowitz: Ratíškovice
- Ratiworz: Ratiboř, p. of Žlutice
- Ratkau: Radkov (Opava District)
- Ratsch: Hradiště, p. of Bžany (Teplice District)
- Ratschendorf: Liberec XXXII-Radčice
- Ratschin: Račín, now Boletice MTA*
- Ratschitz (Ratschütz): Račice, p. of Račice-Pístovice
- Ratschinowes: Račiněves
- Rattai (Ratay): Rataje (Tábor District)
- Rattay (Ratais): Rataje (Kroměříž District)
- Rattay (Ratais an der Sasau): Rataje nad Sázavou
- Rattimau: Vratimov
- Ratzau:
  - Rácov, p. of Batelov
  - Racov, p. of Staré Sedlo (Tachov District)
- Raubowitz: Hroubovice
- Rauchowan (Rouchowan, Rochowann): Rouchovany
- Raudnei: Roudný, p. of Frýdštejn
- Raudnig: Roudníky, p. of Chabařovice
- Raudnitz:
  - Roudnice
  - Roudnice, p. of Jestřabí v Krkonoších
  - (an der Elbe): Roudnice nad Labem
- Rauhenschlag: Chlupatá Ves, p. of Horní Stropnice
- Raunek: Rounek, p. of Vyskytná nad Jihlavou
- Rauschenbach im Kaiserwald: Sítiny, p. of Mnichov (Cheb District)
- Rauschengrund: Šumná, p. of Litvínov
- Rauschka (Rauczka): Růžďka
- Rausen: Rusín
- Rausenbruck: Strachotice
- Rausenstein: Ostrý Kámen, p. of Karle (Svitavy District)
- Rausinow: Rousínov, p. of Slabce
- Rautenberg: Roudno
- Reckerberg: Popelná, p. of Nicov
- Redenitz: Radnice, now Hradiště MTA*
- Regens: Řehořov, p. of Kamenice (Jihlava District)
- Regersdorf: Borek, p. of Zahrádky (Česká Lípa District)
- Rehberg:
  - Liberk
  - Srní
- Reichen: Rychnov, p. of Verneřice
- Reichenau:
  - Rychnov na Moravě
  - Rychnov u Jablonce nad Nisou
- Reichenau an der Knieschna: Rychnov nad Kněžnou
- Reichenau an der Maltsch: Rychnov nad Malší, p. of Dolní Dvořiště
- Reichenberg: Liberec
- Reichetschlag: Mýtina, now Hořice na Šumavě
- Reichenthal: Hraničky, now Rozvadov*
- Reichersdorf: Hradiště, p. of Cheb
- Reichstadt: Zákupy
- Reichwaldau: Rychvald
- Reiditz: Rejdice, p. of Kořenov
- Reifmaß: Radvanov, now Vyšší Brod*
- Reigelsdorf: Rudíkovy, p. of Třemešná
- Reigersdorf:
  - Rejchartice
  - Rejchartice, p. of Dvorce (Bruntál District)
- Reihwiesen: Rejvíz, p. of Zlaté Hory
- Reimlich: Rybí
- Reindlitz: Ryjice
- Reinowitz: Rýnovice, p. of Jablonec nad Nisou
- Reischdorf: Rusová, p. of Kryštofovy Hamry*
- Reisendorf: Trhavice, p. of Norberčany
- Reissig: Klest, p. of Cheb
- Reitenhau (Reutenhau): Rejhotice, p. of Loučná nad Desnou
- Reitendorf: Rapotín
- Reiterschlag: Pasečná, now Přední Výtoň
- Reith:
  - Kleštín, now Vyšší Brod*
  - Loutka, now Boletice MTA*
  - Svánkov, now Světlík*
- Reitschowes: Radíčeves, p. of Žatec
- Remeschin: Řemešín, p. of Kralovice
- Rennersdorf: Rynartice, p. of Jetřichovice
- Rentsch: Řevničov
- Repan (Rzepan): Řepany, p. of Lubenec
- Repeschin: Řepešín, p. of Záblatí (Prachatice District)
- Repschein: Řepčín, p. of Olomouc
- Repin: Řepín
- Repora: Prague-Řeporyje
- Reschen: Rešov, p. of Horní Město
- Reschwitz: Radošov, now Hradiště MTA
- Retaun: Řetouň, p. of Malečov
- Retschkowitz (Rzeckowitz): Brno-Řečkovice
- Rettendorf: Kocbeře
- Rewnitz: Řevnice
- Richenburg: Předhradí
- Richtarzow: Rychtářov, p. of Vyškov
- Richterhäuser: Rychtářov, p. of Brloh (Český Krumlov District)
- Richterhof: Střemily, now Boletice MTA*
- Richtersdorf: Rychtářov, p. of Vyškov
- Riegerschlag: Lodhéřov
- Riegersdorf:
  - Modrá, p. of Jílové
  - Modřec, p. of Polička
- Riehm: Hůrka, p. of Libá
- Riesenberg:
  - Hrad Osek, p. of Osek (Teplice District)
  - Podzámčí, p. of Kdyně
- Riesengebirge: Krkonoše (mountain range)
- Rimau: Římov (České Budějovice District)
- Rinaretz: Rynárec
- Rindlau: Žlíbek, p. of Kašperské Hory
- Rindles: Žlábek, p. of Horní Planá
- Ringelberg: Horní Výšina, p. of Halže
- Ringelsdorf: Kroužek, p. of Rousínov
- Ringelshain: Rynoltice
- Ringenhain: Větrov, p. of Frýdlant
- Rippau: Řepová, p. of Mohelnice
- Rischkau: Hříškov
- Ritschan (Rzitschan, Rican): Říčany
- Ritschen: Rýdeč, p. of Malečov
- Rittersdorf: Rytířov, p. of Verneřice
- Rittersgrün: Nová Kyselka, p. of Kyselka
- Robesgrün: Radvanov, p. of Josefov (Sokolov District)
- Robitsch: Robeč, p. of Úštěk
- Rockendorf: Žitná, now Březová (Sokolov District)*
- Roche: Rochov, p. of Úštěk
- Röchlitz: Liberec VI-Rochlice
- Rochlitz an der Iser: Rokytnice nad Jizerou
- Rodisfort: Radošov, p. of Kyselka
- Rodowitz: Radvanec
- Rodwald: Krčín, p. of Nové Město nad Metují
- Rogau: Velký Radkov, p. of Rejštejn
- Rohatetz: Rohatec
- Rohle: Rohle
- Rohn: Leptač, p. of Chroboly
- Rohr: Nový Drahov, p. of Třebeň
- Rohrbach: Hrušovany u Brna
- Röhrenberg: Žlíbky, p. of Horní Vltavice*
- Röhrenbergerhütte: Samoty, now Horní Vltavice*
- Röhrsdorf:
  - Liščí, p. of Lipová (Děčín District)
  - Svor
- Rohow: Rohov (Opava District)
- Roiden: Rojov, now Rožmitál na Šumavě*
- Roisching: Rojšín, p. of Brloh (Český Krumlov District)
- Roisko (Roysko): Rajsko, p. of Dlouhá Ves (Klatovy District)
- Rojau:
  - Rájov, p. of Mnichov (Cheb District)
  - Rájov, p. of Zlatá Koruna
- Roketnitz: Rokytnice u Přerova
- Rokitnitz in Adlergebirge: Rokytnice v Orlických horách
- Rokitzan (Rokytzan): Rokycany
- Rolessengrün: Návrší, p. of Tuřany (Cheb District)
- Rom: Kladky
- Römerstadt: Rýmařov
- Rommersreuth: Skalka, p. of Hazlov
- Rongstock: Roztoky, p. of Povrly
- Ronow an der Doubrawa (Ronau): Ronov nad Doubravou
- Ronsperg: Poběžovice
- Roppitz: Ropice
- Rosawitz: Děčín V-Rozbělesy
- Roschitz: Rosice, p. of Cerekvička-Rosice
- Roschnow: Rožnov (Náchod District)
- Roschowitz: Radošovice (České Budějovice District)
- Roschtin: Roštín
- Rosenau: Rožnov, p. of Český Rudolec
- Rosenau unter dem Radhoscht: Rožnov pod Radhoštěm
- Rosenberg: Rožmberk nad Vltavou
- Rosendorf: Růžová
- Rosenhain: Rožany, p. of Šluknov
- Rosenhügel: Růžový Vrch, now Přední Výtoň*
- Rosenthal:
  - Rožmitál, p. of Broumov
  - Rožmitál, p. of Zlaté Hory
  - Rožmitál pod Třemšínem
  - Růžodol, p. of Litvínov
  - Liberec XI-Růžodol I
  - Vrchoslav, p. of Krupka
- Rosenthal im Böhmerwald: Rožmitál na Šumavě
- Rosinkau: Nový Hrozenkov
- Rositz: Rosice (Chrudim District)
- Roßbach: Hranice (Cheb District)
- Roßboden: Rozpoutí, p. of Kaplice
- Rossenreuth: Mýtinka, p. of Vojtanov
- Rosshaupt: Rozvadov
- Rössin: Řešín, p. of Bezdružice
- Rossitz: Rosice
- Roßmeisl: Horní Rozmyšl, p. of Dolní Nivy
- Roßnitz: Rosnice, p. of Karlovy Vary
- Rossochatetz: Rozsochatec
- Rossrein (Roßrain): Rozhraní
- Roßwald: Slezské Rudoltice
- Rosternitz: Rostěnice, p. of Rostěnice-Zvonovice
- Rosternitz-Swonowitz: Rostěnice-Zvonovice
- Rostok:
  - Roztoky (Prague-West District)
  - Roztoky (Rakovník District)
  - Roztoky, p. of Šestajovice (Náchod District)
  - Roztoky u Jilemnice
  - Roztoky u Semil
- Roteneck: Červená, p. of Letohrad
- Rothau: Rotava
- Rothaujezd: Červený Újezd, p. of Hrobčice
- Rothenbaum: Červené Dřevo, now Chudenín
- Rothenburg: Červený Hrádek
- Rothengrund: Červený Důl, p. of Uhelná
- Rothenhaus: Červený Hrádek, p. of Jirkov
- Rothenhof: Červený Dvůr, p. of Chvalšiny
- Rothenkreuz: Červený Kříž, p. of Jihlava
- Roth Janowitz: Červené Janovice
- Rothkosteletz: Červený Kostelec
- Roth Lhotta: Červená Lhota
- Rothmühl: Radiměř
- Rothrecitz (Roth Retschitz): Červená Řečice
- Rothsaifen: Červená, p. of Kašperské Hory
- Rotkirchen: Líbeznice
- Rotschau: Ročov
- Rottigl: Rokytná, p. of Moravský Krumlov
- Roubovice: Hroubovice
- Rowetschin: Rovečné
- Rowensko bei Turnau: Rovensko pod Troskami
- Rowenz: Rovensko (Šumperk District)
- Röwersdorf: Třemešná
- Rownatzschow: Rovnáčov, p. of Studenec (Semily District)
- Roy: Ráj, p. of Karviná
- Rozdalowitz: Rožďalovice
- Ruben: Kladenské Rovné, p. of Kájov
- Ruckendorf: Hrudkov, p. of Vyšší Brod
- Rudelsdorf:
  - Rudolice, p. of Most
  - Rudolice v Horách, p. of Hora Svaté Kateřiny
  - Rudoltice
  - Rudoltice, p. of Sobotín
- Rudelzau: Rudoltovice, now Libavá MTA*
- Ruden: Roudné
- Rudig: Vroutek
- Rudikau: Rudíkov
- Ruditzgrün: Rudolec, p. of Březová (Sokolov District)
- Rudolfstadt: Rudolfov
- Rudolfsthal: Liberec XXI-Rudolfov
- Rückersdorf: Dolní Řasnice
- Rumburg: Rumburk
- Ruppelsgrün: Ruprechtov, p. of Hroznětín
- Ruppersdorf: Liberec XIV-Ruprechtice
- Ruprecht: Ruprechtov
- Rzeschohlau: Hřešihlavy, p. of Kladruby (Rokycany District)
- Rzikowitz (Rikowitz): Říkovice
- Rzimau: Římov (Třebíč District)

== S ==
- Saap: Zápy
- Saar:
  - Žďár nad Sázavou
  - Žďár, now Hradiště MTA*
- Saara: Žďár, p. of Velké Chvojno
- Saatz: Žatec (Jihlava District)
- Saaz: Žatec
- Sablat: Záblatí (Prachatice District)
- Sablath: Záblatí, p. of Bohumín
- Sabnitz: Saběnice, p. of Havraň
- Sabor (Saborsch): Záboří (České Budějovice District)
- Sabortsch: Záborčí, p. of Malá Skála
- Sacherles: Kamenná (České Budějovice District)
- Sachradka: Zahrádky (Jindřichův Hradec District)
- Sachrob: Záhrobí, p. of Bělčice
- Sachsenthal: Sasov, p. of Jihlava
- Sadowa: Sadová
- Sadschitz: Zaječice, p. of Vrskmaň
- Sadska: Sadská
- Saduba: Zádub, p. of Olbramov
- Sadusch: Mělník
- Sahaj: Zahájí
- Sahor: Záhořice, p. of Žlutice
- Sahorkowitz: Záhorkovice, p. of Mojné
- Sahorsch:
  - Záhoří (Semily District)
  - Záhoří, p. of Žim
- Sahorschan:
  - Zahořany, p. of Kovářov
  - Zahořany, p. of Králův Dvůr
- Sahrad: Zahrádka, p. of Teplá
- Saidschitz: Zaječice, p. of Bečov
- Saitz: Zaječí
- Sajestetz: Zájezdec
- Salbnuß: Dolní Sukolom, p. of Uničov
- Salzberg: Bílá Skála, p. of Terešov
- Salesel (Salesl):
  - Dolní Zálezly
  - Horní Zálezly, p. of Malečov
  - Zálezly, p. of Skapce
- Salisfeld: Salisov, p. of Zlaté Hory
- Salluschen: Záluží, p. of Dolní Třebonín
- Salmdorf: Salmov, p. of Mikulášovice
- Salmthal: Pstruží, p. of Merklín (Karlovy Vary District)
- Salnau: Želnava
- Saluschan: Zalužany
- Salzergut: Nový Svět, p. of Olomouc
- Salzweg: Solná Lhota, p. of Vimperk
- Samrsk: Zámrsk
- Sand Lhota: Písková Lhota (Nymburk District)
- Sandau:
  - Dolní Žandov
  - Píšť (Opava District)
  - Žandov
- Sandhübel: Písečná (Jeseník District)
- Sandl: Písečná, p. of Litvínov
- Sangerberg (Songerberg): Prameny
- Sankt Anna:
  - Svatá Anna, p. of Horšovský Týn
  - Svatá Anna, p. of Oslov
  - Svatá Anna, p. of Vlčeves
- Sankt Georgenthal: Jiřetín pod Jedlovou
- Sankt Joachimsthal: Jáchymov
- Sankt Johann ob Skrejschow: Svatý Jan
- Sankt Johann unter dem Felsen: Svatý Jan pod Skalou
- Sankt Katharina:
  - Svatá Kateřina, p. of Chudenín
  - Svatá Kateřina, p. of Rozvadov
- Sankt Katharinaberg: Hora Svaté Kateřiny
- Sankt Magdalena: Svatá Maří
- Sankt Niklas: Svatý Mikuláš
- Sankt Sebastiansberg: Hora Svatého Šebestiána
- Sankt Thomas: Svatý Tomáš, now Přední Výtoň
- Sarau (Sarrau): Kyselov, now Vyšší Brod
- Sasau (Sazau):
  - Sázava (Benešov District)
  - Sázava (Žďár nad Sázavou District)
- Saschau: Zašová
- Sasmuk: Zásmuky
- Sassadel: Zásada
- Satkau: Sádek, p. of Deštnice
- Sattel: Sedlo, p. of Útvina
- Sattelberg: Sedlo, now Srní
- Satteles: Sedlečko, p. of Šemnice
- Saubernitz: Zubrnice
- Saubsdorf: Supíkovice
- Sauersack: Rolava, now Přebuz*
- Sawerschitz: Zavržice, p. of Příbram
- Sawersdorf: Závišice
- Sazau (Sasau):
  - Sázava (Benešov District)
  - Sázava (Žďár nad Sázavou District)
- Sbiroch: Zbirohy, p. of Koberovy
- Sbirow: Zbiroh
- Sborau: Zborovy
- Sborowitz: Zborovice
- Sbosch: Zboží, p. of Habry
- Sbraslaus: Zbraslav (Brno-Country District)
- Sbraslawitz: Zbraslavice
- Schaar: Žďár (Rakovník District)
- Schaben: Šabina
- Schaboglück: Žabokliky, p. of Nové Sedlo (Louny District)
- Schabowres: Žabovřesky (České Budějovice District)
- Schachersdorf: Šachotín, p. of Šlapanov
- Schadlowitz: Žádlovice, p. of Loštice
- Schäferei: Ovčárna, p. of Nová Bystřice
- Schaffa: Šafov
- Schafhütten: Rozcestí, p. of Rozvadov
- Schak: Žáky
- Schakwitz: Čejkovice (Znojmo District)
- Schallan: Žalany
- Schamers: Číměř (Jindřichův Hradec District)
- Schanda: Žandov, p. of Chlumec (Ústí nad Labem District)
- Schankau: Čankov, p. of Karlovy Vary
- Schanz: Valy (Cheb District)
- Schanzendorf: Valy, p. of Krompach
- Schärfenberg: Ostrá Hora, p. of Bohušov
- Scharoschitz: Žarošice
- Schaßlowitz: Častolovice, p. of Česká Lípa
- Schattau: Šatov
- Schattawa: Zátoň, p. of Lenora (Prachatice District)
- Schatzlar: Žacléř
- Schaub: Pšov
- Schauflern: Šafléřov, now Malšín*
- Schdiar (Zdiar):
  - Žďár (Blansko District)
  - Žďár (Jindřichův Hradec District)
  - Žďár (Mladá Boleslav District)
  - Žďár (Písek District)
- Schebetau: Šebetov
- Scheer: Žďárek, p. of Chyše
- Schehuschitz: Žehušice
- Scheibelsdorf (Scheibeldorf): Okrouhlička
- Scheiben:
  - Šejby, p. of Horní Stropnice
  - Vyšovatka, p. of Buk (Prachatice District)
- Scheibenraditsch: Okrouhlé Hradiště, p. of Konstantinovy Lázně
- Scheibenreuth: Okrouhlá (Cheb District)
- Scheles: Žihle
- Schelesen: Želízy
- Scheletz: Želeč, p. of Malá Skála
- Schelkowitz bei Bilin: Želkovice
- Schellenken: Želénky, p. of Zabrušany
- Schelletau: Želetava
- Schelsnitz: Přelštice, p. of Kájov
- Schemeslitz: Všemyslice
- Schemmel: Všemily, p. of Jetřichovice
- Schenkenhahn: Tesařov, now Kořenov
- Schepankowitz: Štěpánkovice
- Scheranowitz: Žeranovice
- Scherawitz: Žeravice (Hodonín District)
- Scherzdorf: Heltínov, p. of Luboměř
- Schestau: Žestov, now Hořice na Šumavě
- Scheuereck: Stodůlky, now Strážný*
- Schewetin: Ševětín
- Schichhof (Schichow): Žichov, p. of Měrunice
- Schichowitz: Žichovice
- Schidowitz:
  - Židovice (Jičín District)
  - Židovice (Litoměřice District)
- Schiedel: Šidlov, p. of Zákupy
- Schiedowitz: Židovice, p. of Libčeves
- Schieferhütte: Břidlová, now Šindelová*
- Schiefernau: Šibanov, p. of Poběžovice
- Schießelitz: Žiželice (Louny District)
- Schießnetitz: Žíznětice, p. of Dešenice
- Schießnig: Žizníkov, p. of Česká Lípa
- Schichlitz: Žichlice, now Modlany*
- Schihobetz: Žihobce
- Schild: Bystrá, now Vyšší Brod*
- Schillerberg: Radvanovice, now Stožec(e)
- Schildberg: Štíty
- Schillersdorf: Šilheřovice
- Schiltern: Štítary
- Schima: Žim
- Schimern: Všímary, now Malšín
- Schimitz: Brno-Židenice
- Schimmelsdorf: Pohořílky, p. of Fulnek
- Schimsdorf: Šimonovice
- Schindelhöf: Šindlovy Dvory, p. of Litvínovice
- Schindlau: Šindlov, p. of Borová Lada
- Schindlwald: Šindelová
- Schinkau: Žinkovy
- Schippen: Šípy
- Schiretz (Ziretz): Žírec, p. of Zdíkov
- Schirmdorf: Semanín
- Schirnik: Žernovník, p. of Bezvěrov
- Schlackenwerth (Schlakenwerth): Ostrov (Karlovy Vary District)
- Schlackern: Slavkovice, now Černá v Pošumaví*
- Schlada: Slatina, p. of Františkovy Lázně
- Schlag am Rossberg: Čižkrajice pod Chobolkou, now Vyšší Brod*
- Schlagl: Šavlova Lhota, now Boletice MTA*
- Schlaggenwald: Horní Slavkov
- Schlakau: Slavkov (Opava District)
- Schlan (Salzberg): Slaný
- Schlapanitz (Schlappanitz): Šlapanice
- Schlappenz: Šlapanov
- Schlatten: Slatina (Nový Jičín District)
- Schlausewitz: Služovice
- Schleb: Žleby
- Schlesien: Slezsko
- Schlesisch Kotzendorf: Slezský Kočov, p. of Moravskoslezský Kočov
- Schlesisch Ostrau: Slezská Ostrava, p. of Ostrava
- Schlesisch Hartau: Slezská Harta, p. of Leskovec nad Moravicí
- Schlief: Zliv, p. of Planá
- Schlock: Slavkov, p. of Kozlov (Olomouc District)
- Schlögelsdorf: Šléglov
- Schlösschen: Zámeček
- Schlossbösig: Bezděz
- Schlösselbach: Kořenný, p. of Strážný
- Schluckenau: Šluknov
- Schlumnitz: Slubice, p. of Bohdalovice
- Schlüsselburg: Lnáře
- Schmalzgruben: Nemaničky, p. of Nemanice
- Schmeil: Smilov, now Libavá MTA*
- Schmidles: Smilov, p. of Toužim
- Schmiedeberg: Kovářská
- Schmiedhäuser: Kovářov, p. of Brloh (Český Krumlov District)
- Schmieding: Kovářovice, now Boletice MTA*
- Schmiedsau: Kovářov, p. of Potštát
- Schmiedschlag: Kovářov, p. of Frymburk
- Schmolau: Smolov, p. of Bělá nad Radbuzou
- Schmole: Zvole (Šumperk District)
- Schnauhübel: Sněžná, p. of Krásná Lípa
- Schneckendorf: Hlemýždí, p. of Brniště
- Schneeberg: Sněžník, p. of Jílové
- Schneekoppe: Sněžka (mountain)
- Schneppendorf: Sluková, p. of Valkeřice
- Schneiderschlag: Krejčovice, now Volary
- Schneidetschlag: Veselí, now Boletice MTA*
- Schneidmühl: Pila (Karlovy Vary District)
- Schnobolin: Slavonín, p. of Olomouc
- Schöbersdorf: Šebanov, p. of Hořice na Šumavě
- Schöbritz: Všebořice, p. of Ústí nad Labem
- Schobrowitz: Všeborovice, p. of Dalovice (Karlovy Vary District)
- Schöllschitz: Želešice
- Schömern: Všeměry, p. of Přídolí
- Schömersdorf: Všeměřice, p. of Dolní Dvořiště
- Schömitz: Šemnice
- Schönau:
  - Činov, p. of Doupovské Hradiště
  - Krásensko
  - Loučky, p. of Verneřice
  - Pěkná, p. of Nová Pec
  - Šanov, p. of Červená Voda (Ústí nad Orlicí District)
  - Šenov u Nového Jičína
  - Sněžná, p. of Kraslice
  - Šonov
- Schönbach: Luby (Cheb District)
- Schönbach:
  - (bei Asch): Krásná (Cheb District)
  - Meziboří
  - Zdislava (Liberec District)
- Schönberg: Krásná Hora
- Schönborn:
  - Děčín XXIV-Krásný Studenec
  - Liberec XXXI-Krásná Studánka
  - Stráž u České Lípy, p. of Stružnice
  - Studánka, p. of Varnsdorf
- Schönbrunn:
  - Dolní Studénky
  - Jedlová
  - Studánka
  - Svinov, p. of Ostrava
- Schönbüchel: Krásný Buk, p. of Krásná Lípa
- Schönfeld:
  - Krásná Pole, now Loučovice*
  - Krásné Pole, p. of Chřibská
  - Krásné Pole, p. of Ostrava
  - Krásno (Sokolov District)
- Schönfelden: Osí, now Boletice MTA*
- Schönficht: Smrkovec, now Březová (Sokolov District)*
- Schönhengst: Hřebeč, p. of Koclířov
- Schönhof:
  - Krásný Dvůr
  - Šenov
- Schönichel: Šunychl, p. of Bohumín
- Schönlind: Krásná Lípa, p. of Šindelová
- Schönlinde: Krásná Lípa
- Schöninger (mountain): Kleť
- Schönpriesen: Krásné Březno, p. of Ústí nad Labem
- Schönstein: Dolní Životice
- Schönthal:
  - Krásné, p. of Tři Sekery
  - Krásné Údolí
- Schönwald:
  - Krásný Les (Karlovy Vary District)
  - Krásný Les (Liberec District)
  - Krásný Les, p. of Petrovice (Ústí nad Labem District)
  - Lesná (Tachov District)
  - Podlesí, now Bartošovice v Orlických horách
  - Podlesí, p. of Budišov nad Budišovkou
  - Strážná
  - Šumná
  - Šumvald
- Schönwehr: Krásný Jez, p. of Bečov nad Teplou
- Schönwerth: Krásná, p. of Kraslice
- Schönwiese: Krásné Loučky, p. of Krnov
- Schoschuwka: Šošůvka
- Schossendorf: Radeč, p. of Žandov
- Schossenreith: Částkov (Tachov District)
- Schößl: Všestudy
- Schreckenstein: Střekov, p. of Ústí nad Labem
- Schreibendorf: Písařov
- Schreiberseifen: Skrbovice, p. of Široká Niva
- Schreibersdorf: Hněvošice
- Schreinetschlag: Skříněřov, p. of Zbytiny
- Schrikowitz: Křepkovice, p. of Teplá
- Schrittenz: Střítež (Jihlava District)
- Schröbersdorf: Radešov, p. of Rejštejn
- Schröffelsdorf: Nová Dědina, p. of Uničov
- Schukatschen: Šukačka, now Čachrov
- Schumbarg: Šumbark, p. of Havířov
- Schumberg: Žumberk
- Schumburg: Krásná, p. of Pěnčín (Jablonec nad Nisou District)
- Schumburg an der Desse: Šumburk nad Desnou, p. of Tanvald
- Schumitz: Šumice (Uherské Hradište District)
- Schüppen: Šípy
- Schurz: Žireč, p. of Dvůr Králové nad Labem
- Schusitz: Žehušice
- Schüttenhofen: Sušice
- Schüttenitz: Žitenice
- Schüttwa: Šitboř, p. of Poběžovice
- Schützendorf: Slavoňov, p. of Lukavice (Šumperk District)
- Schutzengel: Anděl Strážce, p. of Frýdštejn
- Schwaben: Šváby, p. of Zahrádky (Česká Lípa District)
- Schwabenitz: Švábenice
- Schwabitz: Svébořice, p. of Ralsko
- Schwaden: Svádov, p. of Ústí nad Labem
- Schwaderbach: Bublava
- Schwadowitz, Klein-Schwadowitz: Malé Svatoňovice
- Schwalben: Vlastějov, p. of Hartmanice (Klatovy District)
- Schwanenberg: Labutice, p. of Suchdol (Prostějov District)
- Schwanenbrückl: Mostek, p. of Rybník (Domažlice District)*
- Schwansdorf: Svatoňovice
- Schwarzbuda: Černé Budy
- Schwarzbach: Černá v Pošumaví
- Schwarzenbach:
  - Černava
  - Černá, p. of Kraslice
- Schwarzenberg: Černá Hora (Blansko District)
- Schwarzenthal: Černý Důl
- Schwarzhaid: Černá Lada, p. of Borová Lada
- Schwarzkirchen: Ostrovačice
- Schwarzkosteletz: Kostelec nad Černými lesy
- Schwarzpfütze (Schwarze Pfütze): Jítrava, p. of Rynoltice
- Schwarzthal: Černé Údolí, p. of Benešov nad Černou
- Schwarzwasser:
  - Černá Voda
  - Černá Voda, now Orlické Záhoří
- Schwaz: Světec
- Schweine: Janoslavice, p. of Rohle
- Schweinetschlag: Sviňovice, p. of Zbytiny
- Schweinitz:
  - Sviny (Tábor District)
  - Trhové Sviny
- Schweinschädel: Svinišťany, p. of Dolany (Náchod District)
- Schweissing: Svojšín
- Schwetz: Bedřichův Světec, p. of Bělušice (Most District)
- Schwiebgrub: Svíba, now Boletice MTA*
- Schwihau: Švihov (Klatovy District)
- Schwinau: Svinov, p. of Útvina
- Schwillbogen: Svébohov
- Schwindschitz: Svinčice, p. of Lužice (Most District)
- Schwitz: Světec, p. of Bezvěrov
- Sdechowitz: Zdechovice (Pardubice District)
- Sdenitz: Zdenice, p. of Nebahovy
- Sdeslaw: Zdeslav, p. of Poleň
- Sdounek: Zdounky
- Sduchowitz: Zduchovice
- Sebastiansberg: Hora Svatého Šebestiána
- Sebenbach: Chvoječná, p. of Cheb
- Sebranitz:
  - Sebranice (Blansko District)
  - Sebranice (Svitavy District)
- Sebrowitz: Brno-Žabovřesky
- Sebusein: Sebuzín, p. of Ústí nad Labem
- Seckerberg: Horky, now Srní*
- Sedletz:
  - Sedlec (Litoměřice District)
  - Sedlec (Mladá Boleslav District)
  - Sedlec (Plzeň-North District)
  - Sedlec (Prague-East District)
  - Sedlec (Třebíč District)
  - Sedlec, p. of Kutná Hora
  - Sedlec, p. of Sedlec-Prčice
  - Sedlec, p. of Vraclav
- Sedlitz:
  - Sedlice (Strakonice District)
  - Sedlice, p. of Korozluky
  - Sedlice, p. of Přídolí
- Sedlmin: Sedlmín, now Prachatice*
- Sedlnitz: Sedlnice
- Sedlowitz: Sedlejovice, p. of Sychrov (Liberec District)
- Seeberg: Ostroh, p. of Poustka
- Seehaid: Svinná Lada, p. of Borová Lada
- Seelau:
  - Želina, p. of Rokle
  - Želiv
- Seelenz: Ždírec (Jihlava District)
- Seelowitz: Židlochovice
- Seesitz: Žežice, p. of Chuderov
- Seestadtl: Ervěnice, now Most*
- Seewiesen: Javorná, p. of Čachrov
- Segen Gottes: Zastávka
- Sehrlenz: Ždírec (Havlíčkův Brod District)
- Sehuschitz: Žehušice
- Seibelsdorf: Žipotín, p. of Gruna
- Seichenreuth: Táborská, p. of Hazlov
- Seidenschwanz: Vrkoslavice, p. of Jablonec nad Nisou
- Seifen: Ryžovna, p. of Boží Dar
- Seifenbach: Ryžoviště, p. of Harrachov
- Seifersdorf: Zátor
- Seitendorf:
  - Hladké Životice
  - Horní Životice
  - Životice u Nového Jičína
- Selcan (Seltschan): Sedlčany
- Selletitz:
  - Seletice, p. of Postoloprty
  - Želetice (Znojmo District)
- Sellnitz: Želenice (Most District)
- Selsen: Želivsko
- Seltsch: Želeč, p. of Měcholupy (Louny District)
- Selz:
  - (Selze): Sedlec (České Budějovice District)
  - Sedlec, p. of Křešice
  - Prague-Sedlec
- Semenkowitz: Seménkovice, p. of Postoloprty
- Semeschitz: Semošice, p. of Horšovský Týn
- Semil: Semily
- Semitz: Semice
- Semlowitz: Semněvice
- Semtisch: Semtěš, p. of Pšov
- Senftenberg: Žamberk
- Senftleben: Ženklava
- Senomat: Senomaty
- Senoschat: Senožaty, p. of Bechyně
- Sensemitz: Sezemice, p. of Rtyně nad Bílinou
- Serbitz: Srbice (Teplice District)
- Serles: Záhoří, p. of Verušičky
- Serowitz (Serownitz): Žirovnice
- Sestronowitz: Sestroňovice, p. of Frýdštejn
- Setsch: Seč
- Settenz: Řetenice, p. of Teplice
- Setzdorf: Vápenná
- Sezemitz (Sesemitz):
  - Sezemice (Mladá Boleslav District)
  - Sezemice (Pardubice District)
- Sichelbach: Blato, p. of Nová Bystřice
- Sicheritz: Čichořice, p. of Chyše
- Sichlau: Čichalov
- Sichrow: Sychrov (Liberec District)
- Siebenhäuser:
  - Sedm Chalup, p. of Brloh (Český Krumlov District)
  - Sedmidomí, now Velké Svatoňovice
  - Sedmidomí, now Zbytiny
- Siebenhöfen: Sedm Dvorů, p. of Moravský Beroun
- Siebentann: Simtany, p. of Pohled (Havlíčkův Brod District)
- Siebitz:
  - Třebovice, now Boletice MTA*
  - Třebovice, p. of Ktiš
- Siegertsau: Zigartice, now Libavá MTA*
- Siehdichfür: Hleďsebe, p. of Bělá nad Radbuzou
- Siertsch: Ždírec (Česká Lípa District)
- Siertschgrund: Ždírecký Důl, p. of Ždírec (Česká Lípa District)
- Silberbach: Stříbrná
- Silberberg:
  - Orlovice, p. of Pocinovice
  - Stříbrné Hory, p. of Nalžovské Hory
  - Stříbrné Hutě, now Pohorská Ves*
- Silbersgrün: Háj, p. of Jindřichovice (Sokolov District)
- Silberskalitz: Stříbrná Skalice
- Siluwka: Silůvky
- Simmensdorf: Šimanov
- Simmersdorf: Smrčná
- Sinzendorf: Velká Ves, p. of Bor (Tachov District)
- Sirb: Srby (Domažlice District)
- Sirmitz: Žirovice, p. of Františkovy Lázně
- Sirnin: Srnín
- Sittmesgrün: Mezirolí, p. of Nová Role
- Sittna: Sytno
- Sitzgras: Cizkrajov
- Skirschina: Skršín
- Skocitz: Skočice
- Skretschon: Skřečoň, p. of Bohumín
- Skrezipp (Skripp): Skřipov
- Skridla: Skřidla, p. of Velešín
- Skrischow: Skrýšov, p. of Polná
- Skrochowitz: Skrochovice, p. of Brumovice (Opava District)
- Skuchrow an der Alba: Skuhrov nad Bělou
- Skupitz: Skupice, p. of Postoloprty
- Skupsch: Skupeč, p. of Pernarec
- Skutsch (Skuc): Skuteč
- Skworetz: Škvorec
- Slabetz: Slabce
- Slabisch: Slavošov, p. of Povrly
- Slap: Slapy, p. of Frýdštejn
- Slatinan: Slatiňany
- Slatnik (Zlatnik): Zlatníky, p. of Opava
- Slaup: Sloup (Blansko District)
- Slawathen: Slavětín, p. of Písečné (Jindřichův Hradec District)
- Slawietin:
  - Slavětín (Louny District)
  - Slavětín (Olomouc District)
  - (an der Mettau): Slavětín nad Metují
- Slawitsch: Hranice VII-Slavíč
- Slawitschin: Slavičín
- Slawoschowitz: Slavošovice, p. of Bolešiny
- Slibowitz: Slibovice, p. of Běrunice
- Sliw: Zliv
- Slizan: Slížany, p. of Morkovice-Slížany
- Slonin: Zlonín
- Slonitz: Zlonice
- Sloupnitz: Sloupnice
- Sluschowitz: Slušovice
- Smerdow: Sázavka
- Smerhau: Smrhov, p. of Soběnov
- Smerschowitz: Smržovice, p. of Kdyně
- Smetschno (Smeczno, Smeczna): Smečno
- Smidar: Smidary
- Smilau: Smilov, p. of Štoky
- Smiler Berg: Smilovy Hory
- Smilkau: Smilkov
- Smiritz (Smirzitz, Smirschitz): Smiřice
- Smolkau: Smolkov, p. of Háj ve Slezsku
- Smrdov: Sázavka
- Smrschitz: Smržice
- Sniehow: Sněhov, p. of Malá Skála
- Sobeslau (Sobieslau): Soběslav
- Sobiechleb: Soběchleby
- Sobiesak: Soběsuky, p. of Chbany
- Sobieschitz: Soběšice
- Sobietitz:
  - Sobětice, p. of Klatovy
  - Sobětice, p. of Žimutice
- Sobochleben: Soběchleby, p. of Krupka
- Soborten: Sobědruhy, p. of Teplice
- Sobrusan: Zabrušany
- Socherl: Suchohrdly u Miroslavi
- Sodau: Sadov
- Söhle: Žilina, p. of Nový Jičín
- Sohors: Žár
- Sohorz: Žďár, p. of Kaplice
- Sokolnitz: Sokolnice
- Sollan: Solany, p. of Děčany
- Solletin: Saladín, p. of Záblatí (Prachatice District)
- Solislau: Sulislav
- Sollmus: Žalmanov, p. of Stružná
- Sollowitz: Salavice, p. of Třešť
- Solnitz: Solnice
- Sonnberg:
  - Slunečná, p. of Želnava
  - Žumberk, p. of Žár
- Sonnenberg: Výsluní
- Sophienhain: Žofín, p. of Horní Podluží
- Sophienthal: Černá Řeka, p. of Klenčí pod Čerchovem
- Sorghof: Lučina, now Milíře*
- Sörgsdorf: Uhelná
- Sosen: Zásada u Kadaně, p. of Kadaň
- Soutitz: Soutice
- Spachendorf: Leskovec nad Moravicí
- Spansdorf: Lipová, p. of Chuderov
- Springenberg: Pomezí, p. of Všeruby (Domažlice District)
- Sepekau: Sepekov
- Speierling: Skviřín, p. of Bor (Tachov District)
- Spieglitz: Nová Seninka, p. of Staré Město (Šumperk District)
- Spiels: Splž, p. of Strážov (Klatovy District)
- Spillendorf: Oborná
- Spilsow: Splzov, p. of Železný Brod
- Spindlermühle (Spindelmühle): Špindlerův Mlýn
- Spitinau: Spytihněv (Zlín District)
- Spittelgrund: Dolní Sedlo, p. of Hrádek nad Nisou
- Spittengrün: Nivy, p. of Děpoltovice
- Spitzberg:
  - Chýšky, p. of Chyše
  - Špičák, p. of Železná Ruda
- Spitzenberg: Hory, p. of Horní Planá
- Spomischl: Spomyšl
- Sponau: Spálov
- Sporitz: Spořice
- Spornhau: Ostružná
- Srutsch an der Sasau: Zruč nad Sázavou
- Staab: Stod (Plzeň-South District)
- Stablowitz: Štáblovice
- Stabnitz: Stebnice, p. of Lipová (Cheb District)
- Stachau: Stachy
- Stachenwald: Stachovice, p. of Fulnek
- Stachl: Stachov, p. of Blšany
- Stachlowitz: Štachlovice, now Vidnava
- Staditz: Stadice, p. of Řehlovice
- Stadl (Stadtl): Stodola, now Františkovy Lázně
- Stadlern: Stádla, p. of Prachatice
- Stadln (Stadeln): Stodůlky, now Prášily*
- Stadthöfen: Štoutov, p. of Čichalov
- Städtische Oed: Městská Lhotka, p. of Prachatice
- Stadt Liebau: Město Libavá
- Stahletz (Stachletz): Stádlec
- Stallek: Stálky
- Stangendorf: Vendolí
- Stankau:
  - Staňkov (Domažlice District)
  - Staňkov (Jindřichův Hradec District)
- Stankowitz:
  - Staňkovice (Kutná Hora District)
  - Staňkovice (Litoměřice District)
  - Staňkovice (Louny District)
- Stannern: Stonařov
- Stanow: Stanový, p. of Zlatá Olešnice (Jablonec nad Nisou District)
- Stanowitz: Stanovice, p. of Mariánské Lázně
- Stänzelsdorf: Stanislavice, p. of Český Těšín
- Staritsch (Starzitz): Staříč
- Starkenbach: Jilemnice
- Starkstadt: Stárkov
- Starlitz: Starý Láz, p. of Nýrsko
- Startsch: Stařeč
- Starosedl: Starosedly, now Žalany
- Starz: Starec, p. of Kdyně
- Staudenz: Studenec, p. of Trutnov
- Stauding: Studénka
- Stechowitz: Štěchovice
- Stecken: Štoky
- Stedra: Štědrá
- Stein:
  - Kámen, p. of Kraslice
  - Skalka, p. of Cheb
- Stein im Böhmerwald: Polná na Šumavě
- Steinau: Stonava
- Stein Aujezd (Stein Augezd): Kamenný Újezd, p. of Nýřany
- Steinbach:
  - Kamenice, p. of Březová (Sokolov District)
  - Květoňov, p. of Kaplice
- Steindorf: Hubenov
- Steine: Kamenná (Šumperk District)
- Steingrub: Lomnička, p. of Plesná
- Steingrün: Výhledy, p. of Hazlov
- Steinhof: Kamenný Dvůr, p. of Kynšperk nad Ohří
- Steinhübel: Kamenná Horka, p. of Krásná Lípa
- Steinige Höhe: Kamenáč
- Steinitz: Ždánice (Hodonín District)
- Steinitz: Uherský Ostroh
- Steinkirchen: Kamenný Újezd (České Budějovice District)
- Steinköpfl: Kamenná Hlava, now Stožec*
- Stein Lhota: Kamenná Lhota
- Steinmetz: Stavenice
- Steinpöhl: Kamenná, p. of Krásná (Cheb District)
- Steinschönau (Stein-Schönau): Kamenický Šenov
- Steinsdorf:
  - Kámen (Havlíčkův Brod District)
  - Kamenec, p. of Jílové
- Steinüberfuhr: Kamenný Přívoz
- Steken (Stiekna): Štěkeň
- Stelzengrün: Stará Chodovská, p. of Chodov (Sokolov District)
- Stengles: Kamenec, p. of Stráž nad Ohří
- Stepanitz: Štěpanice, p. of Hartmanice (Klatovy District)
- Stepanowitz: Štěpánovice (České Budějovice District)
- Stephanau (Stefanau):
  - Horní Štěpánov
  - Štěpánov
- Stephansruh: Příchovice, p. of Kořenov
- Sterkowitz: Strkovice, p. of Postoloprty
- Stern: Hvězda, now Loučovice*
- Sternberg:
  - Český Šternberk
  - Šternberk
- Stetkowitz: Štětkovice
- Stettin: Štítina
- Stezer (Stößer): Stěžery
- Stiahlau: Šťáhlavy
- Stiebenreith: Ctiboř (Tachov District)
- Stiebnig: Jistebník
- Stiebnitz: Zdobnice
- Stiebrowitz: Stěbořice
- Stiegesdorf: Zdíky, p. of Bujanov
- Stieks: Štěkře, p. of Dolní Třebonín
- Stienowitz: Štěnovice
- Stiepanau: Štěpánov nad Svratkou
- Stiepanow: Štěpánov, p. of Lukov (Teplice District)
- Stillfried: Víska, p. of Dětřichov (Svitavy District)
- Stimmersdorf: Mezná, p. of Hřensko
- Stittna: Štítná nad Vláří, p. of Štítná nad Vláří-Popov
- Stipoklas: Štipoklasy
- Stipp (Stiep): Štípa, p. of Zlín
- Stirchlep: Krchleby, p. of Staňkov (Domažlice District)
- Stitkau: Štítkov, p. of Svatá Maří
- Stöben: Stebno
- Stockau: Štokov, p. of Chodský Újezd
- Stockau: Pivoň, p. of Mnichov (Domažlice District)
- Stöcken: Štoky
- Stögenwald: Pestřice, now Horní Planá*
- Stokern: Plískov, now Lipno nad Vltavou
- Stömnitz: Jistebník, now Rožmitál na Šumavě
- Stojanowitz: Stojanovice, p. of Velhartice
- Stolzenhain (Stolzenhann): Háj, p. of Loučná pod Klínovcem
- Stolzenhan: Pyšná, p. of Vysoká Pec (Chomutov District)
- Stoschitz: Stožice
- Strachowitz: Strachovice, p. of Stráž (Tachov District)
- Straden: Stradov, p. of Chlumec (Ústí nad Labem District)
- Strahl: Střelná, p. of Košťany
- Strahl Hoschtitz: Střelské Hoštice
- Strahof: Strahov, p. of Horní Kozolupy
- Straka: Straky, p. of Zabrušany
- Strakonitz: Strakonice
- Stramberg: Štramberk
- Strandorf: Strahovice
- Stranik: Straník, p. of Nový Jičín
- Strany (Stran): Strání
- Straschitz: Strašice
- Straschkau: Strážek
- Straschkowitz: Strážkovice, p. of Malé Svatoňovice
- Straßenau: Benešov, p. of Broumov
- Straßnitz: Strážnice
- Straupitz: Stroupeč, p. of Žiželice (Louny District)
- Straußnitz: Stružnice
- Strazowitz (Straschowitz):
  - Strážovice
  - Strážovice, p. of Křečovice
  - Strážovice, p. of Mirotice
  - Strážovice, p. of Pačejov
- Strechow (an der Sasau): Střechov nad Sázavou, p. of Trhový Štěpánov
- Stredokluk: Středokluky
- Streitseifen: Podlesí, now Potůčky
- Strelitz: Střelice, p. of Uničov
- Stremplowitz: Štemplovec, p. of Holasovice
- Stresmir (Strezmier): Střezimíř
- Strewelna: Střevelná, p. of Železný Brod
- Strickerhäuser: Mýtiny, p. of Harrachov
- Strietesch: Střítež nad Bečvou
- Strilek (Strzilek): Střílky
- Strisowitz: Střížovice, p. of Chlumec (Ústí nad Labem District)
- Striter (Stritesch): Střítež (Pelhřimov District)
- Stritschitz: Strýčice
- Strobnitz: Horní Stropnice
- Strodau: Stradov, p. of Omlenice
- Stropnitz: Dolní Stropnice, p. of Římov (České Budějovice District)
- Strokele: Strakov
- Strunkowitz (an der Flanitz): Strunkovice nad Blanicí
- Strups: Srubec
- Strupschein: Strupšín, p. of Brníčko
- Strutz: Troubsko
- Strzebowitz: Třebovice, p. of Ostrava
- Stubau: Dubová, p. of Přídolí
- Stuben: Hůrka, p. of Horní Planá
- Stubenbach: Prášily
- Stubendorf: Studnice, now Osoblaha
- Stubenseifen: Stříbrnice, p. of Staré Město (Šumperk District)
- Studein: Studená (Jindřichův Hradec District)
- Studenetz: Studenec (Semily District)
- Studinke: Horní Studénky
- Studnitz:
  - Studnice (Chrudim District)
  - Studnice (Náchod District)
  - Studnice (Třebíč District)
  - Studnice (Vyškov District)
- Stüblern: Posudov, now Frymburk
- Stübling: Žibřidov, now Dolní Dvořiště*
- Studene: Studené
- Stupna: Stupná, p. of Křemže
- Stürbitz: Štrbice, p. of Světec
- Subschitz: Zubčice
- Subschitzer Mehlhüttel: Zubčická Lhotka, p. of Zubčice
- Suchenthal:
  - Suchdol, p. of Bujanov
  - Suchdol nad Lužnicí
- Suchey:
  - Suchá, p. of Stebno
  - Suché, p. of Modlany
- Sucholasetz: Suché Lazce, p. of Opava
- Sudomierschitz (Sudomieritz):
  - Sudoměřice
  - Sudoměřice u Bechyně
  - Sudoměřice u Tábora
- Sukdol: Prague-Suchdol
- Sukohrad: Sukorady, p. of Snědovice
- Sulotitz: Suletice, p. of Homole u Panny
- Suttom: Sutom, p. of Třebenice (Litoměřice District)
- Swatkowitz: Svatkovice
- Swetla (Swietla ob der Sasau): Světlá nad Sázavou
- Swikowetz: Zvíkovec
- Swinietitz: Svinětice, p. of Bavorov
- Swinna: Svinná, p. of Čachrov
- Swiretitz: Zvěřetice, p. of Babice (Prachatice District)
- Swittawka: Svitávka
- Swoboda: Svoboda, p. of Štěpánkovice
- Swojanow: Svojanov
- Swojschitz: Svojšice (Kolín District)
- Swolenowes: Zvoleněves
- Swonowitz: Zvonovice, p. of Rostěnice-Zvonovice
- Swratka: Svratka (Žďár nad Sázavou District)
- Swudschitz: Svučice, p. of Mišovice

== T ==
- Tabor:
  - Tábor
  - Tábor, p. of Velké Heraltice
- Tacha: Tachov (Česká Lípa District)
- Tachau: Tachov
- Tachauer Brand: Milíře
- Tachauer Schmelzthal: Tachovská Huť, p. of Tři Sekery
- Tachlowitz: Tachlovice
- Taikowitz: Tavíkovice
- Tajanow:
  - Tajanov, p. of Klatovy
  - Tajanov, p. of Kolinec
- Tannawa: Ždánov
- Tannaweg: Jedlová
- Tannendorf (Tannendörfel): Jedlová, p. of Jiřetín pod Jedlovou
- Tannwald: Tanvald
- Taschendorf: Tošovice, p. of Odry
- Taschow: Tašov
- Taschwitz:
  - Horní Tašovice, p. of Stružná
  - Tašovice, p. of Karlovy Vary
- Tassau: Tasov (Žďár nad Sázavou District)
- Tassowitz: Tasovice (Blansko District)
- Taßwitz: Tasovice (Znojmo District)
- Tattenitz: Tatenice
- Tattern: Tatry, now Hořice na Šumavě*
- Doubravice: Tauberwitz, p. of Homole u Panny
- Taubnitz: Dubnice, p. of Lichnov (Bruntál District)
- Taubrath: Doubrava, p. of Lipová (Cheb District)
- Taus: Domažlice
- Tauschim: Lázně Toušeň
- Tauschkow: Touškov, p. of Mirovice
- Taurau: Tourov, p. of Bavorov
- Techlowitz: Těchlovice, p. of Stříbro
- Teichhausen: Rybničná, p. of Bochov
- Teichstatt: Rybniště
- Teinitz an der Sasau: Týnec nad Sázavou
- Teinitzl (Teinitzel):
  - Týnec (Klatovy District)
  - Týnec, p. of Chotěšov (Plzeň-South District)
- Tellnitz: Telnice (Ústí nad Labem District)
- Telnitz: Telnice (Brno-Country District)
- Teltsch:
  - Teleč, p. of Bochov
  - Telč
- Temnitz:
  - Těmice (Hodonín District)
  - Těmice (Pelhřimov District)
- Tepl: Teplá
- Tepl Stift: Klášter, p. of Teplá
- Teplitz-Schönau (Teplitz): Teplice
- Tereschau:
  - Terešov
  - Terešov, p. of Hlubočany
- Teschau: Těšov, p. of Milíkov (Cheb District)
- Teschen: Český Těšín
- Teschetitz: Těšetice, p. of Bochov
- Teschnitz:
  - Deštnice
  - (Tieschnitzl): Těšnice, p. of Švihov (Klatovy District)
- Teschwitz: Těšovice (Sokolov District)
- Tetschen (Tetschen-Bodenbach): Děčín
- Tetschendorf: Tetčiněves, p. of Úštěk
- Teutschenrust: Podbořanský Rohozec
- Teutschmannsdorf: Skláře, p. of Hořice na Šumavě
- Thaya (river): Dyje
- Thein:
  - Týn nad Bečvou
  - Týn, p. of Lomnice (Sokolov District)
  - Týnec, p. of Planá
- Theresiendorf: Pohorská Ves
- Theresienstadt: Terezín
- Theresienthal: Terezín, p. of Petrov nad Desnou
- Theusing: Toužim
- Theußau: Tisová, p. of Březová (Sokolov District)
- Thierbach: Suchá, p. of Nejdek
- Thiergarten: Obora (Tachov District)
- Tholl: Doly, p. of Bor (Tachov District)
- Thomasdorf:
  - Domašov, p. of Bělá pod Pradědem
  - Tomášov, p. of Mikulášovice
- Thomigsdorf: Damníkov
- Thonbrunn: Studánka, p. of Hranice (Cheb District)
- Thönischen: Týniště, p. of Verušičky
- Thröm: Třebom
- Thurmplandles: Věžovatá Pláně
- Thurn: Tuřany (Cheb District)
- Thusing: Toužín, p. of Dačice
- Tichau: Tichá
- Tichlowitz: Těchlovice (Děčín District)
- Tichtiöfen: Dětochov, now Polná na Šumavě*
- Tiechobuz: Těchobuz
- Tiefenbach:
  - Desná II, p. of Desná (Jablonec nad Nisou District)
  - Hluboký, p. of Ostrov (Karlovy Vary District)
  - Prague-Hloubětín
- Tiefenfeld: Hluboká, p. of Kdyně
- Tiefengrund: Hlubočec
- Tiepersch: Těpeře, p. of Železný Brod
- Tierlitzko: Těrlicko
- Tieschan (Tischau): Těšany
- Tieschetitz: Těšetice (Olomouc District)
- Tieschowitz (Teschowitz): Těšovice (Prachatice District)
- Tillendorf: Tylov, p. of Lomnice (Bruntál District)
- Tilmitschau: Tlumačov (Domažlice District)
- Tinischt: Týniště nad Orlicí
- Tirna: Trnová, p. of Tisová (Tachov District)
- Tirschnitz: Tršnice, p. of Cheb
- Tisch: Ktiš
- Tischau: Mstišov, p. of Dubí
- Tischlern: Skubice, now Bohdalovice*
- Tischnowitz: Tišnov
- Tischtin: Tištín
- Tissa: Tisová (Tachov District)
- Tissa bei Bodenbach: Tisá
- Tissau: Tisová, p. of Otročín
- Tlumatschau: Tlumačov
- Tmain: Tmaň
- Tobitschau: Tovačov
- Tochowitz: Tochovice
- Todlau: Datelov, p. of Dešenice
- Todnie: Todně, p. of Trhové Sviny
- Tollenstein: Rozhled, p. of Jiřetín pod Jedlovou
- Töplei (Tepley, Teplai): Teplá, p. of Třebenice (Litoměřice District)
- Töpplitz: Teplice
- Tomitschan: Domašín
- Tonnberg: Hlinov, p. of Horní Stropnice
- Tonnetschlag: Rohanov, p. of Chroboly
- Töpeles: Teplička (Karlovy Vary District)
- Topieletz: Topělec, p. of Čížová
- Topkowitz: Dobkovice
- Topolan: Topolany, p. of Olomouc
- Totschnik: Točník
- Tousitz: Toušice
- Tracht: Strachotín
- Trasenau: Draženov
- Traubek: Troubky
- Trautenau: Trutnov
- Trautenbach: Babí, p. of Trutnov
- Traxelmoos: Slatiny
- Trebelowitz (Trzebellowitz): Třebelovice
- Trebendorf: Třebeň
- Trebine: Třebín, p. of Úštěk
- Trebitsch: Třebíč
- Trebnitz:
  - Třebenice (Litoměřice District)
  - Třebnice, p. of Meclov
  - Třebnice, p. of Sedlčany
- Trebusitz: Třebusice
- Tremles: Strmilov
- Treskonitz (Trzeskonitz): Třeskonice, p. of Tuchořice
- Treublitz: Troubelice
- Treunitz: Dřenice, p. of Cheb
- Trhonin (Terhonin): Trhonín, p. of Svatá Maří
- Trhow Kamenitz: Trhová Kamenice
- Triebendorf: Třebařov
- Triebitz: Třebovice
- Trieblitz (Triblitz, Trziblitz): Třebívlice
- Triebsch: Třebušín
- Triebischl: Třebíška, p. of Výsluní
- Triebschitz: Třebusice, now Most*
- Triesch: Třešť
- Triesenhof: Střížov, p. of Cheb
- Trinka: Dřínek, now Hrobčice*
- Trinksaifen: Rudné, p. of Vysoká Pec (Karlovy Vary District)
- Tritesch: Střítež (Český Krumlov District)
- Trnawka: Trnávka (Nový Jičín District)
- Trippischen: Trpěšice, p. of Hartmanice (Klatovy District)
- Tritschmersch: Střeziměřice, p. of Horní Stropnice
- Trittschein: Třeština
- Trnowan:
  - Trnovany
  - Trnovany, p. of Žatec
- Trojanowitz: Trojanovice
- Trojern: Trojany, p. of Dolní Dvořiště
- Troppau: Opava
- Tropplowitz: Opavice, p. of Město Albrechtice
- Troschig: Strážky, p. of Ústí nad Labem
- Trossau: Dražov, p. of Stanovice (Karlovy Vary District)
- Trpist: Trpísty
- Trschitz: Tršice
- Trübenwasser: Kalná Voda, now Mladé Buky*
- Truß: Ústí, p. of Kočov
- Trzemoschna: Třemošná
- Trziblitz: Třebívlice
- Trzynietz (Trzinietz): Třinec
- Tschachrau: Čachrov
- Tschachwitz: Čachovice, now Březno (Chomutov District)*
- Tschaslau: Čáslav
- Tschaslawitz: Čáslavice
- Tschastolowitz: Častolovice
- Tschastrow: Častrov
- Tschausch: Souš, p. of Most
- Tschebon: Třebouň, p. of Toužim
- Tscheche: Děčín XIX-Čechy
- Tschechen: Čechyně, p. of Rousínov
- Tschechisch-Teschen: Český Těšín
- Tschechtitz: Čechtice
- Tscheitsch: Čejč
- Tschelakowitz: Čelákovice
- Tschelechowitz (in der Hanna): Čelechovice na Hané
- Tschenkowitz: Čenkovice
- Tschentschitz:
  - Černčice, p. of Petrohrad
  - Černčice, p. of Žalany
- Tscheraditz: Čeradice
- Tschernahora: Černá Hora, p. of Bělá nad Radbuzou
- Tschernhausen: Černousy
- Tschernitz:
  - Černice, p. of Horní Jiřetín
  - Černice, p. of Mojné
- Tschernoschin (Czernoschin): Černošín
- Tschernoschitz: Černošice
- Tschernowier: Černovír, p. of Olomouc
- Tschernowitz:
  - Černovice (Blansko District)
  - Černovice (Chomutov District)
  - Černovice (Pelhřimov District)
- Tschersing: Čeřeniště, p. of Malečov
- Tschertin (Certin): Čertyně, p. of Dolní Třebonín
- Tschestitz: Čestice (Strakonice District)
- Tschiaschel: Čáslav, p. of Verneřice
- Tschichtitz: Čichtice, p. of Bavorov
- Tschies: Číhaná, p. of Bochov
- Tschiest: Čistá u Horek
- Tschihana: Číhání, p. of Chyše
- Tschihoscht: Číhošť
- Tschim: Čím
- Tschimelitz: Cimelice
- Tschimischel: Třemešek, p. of Oskava
- Tschirm: Čermná ve Slezsku
- Tschischkowitz:
  - Čížkovice
  - Čížkovice 1.díl, p. of Maršovice (Jablonec nad Nisou District)
- Tschisow (Trisau): Třísov, p. of Holubov
- Tschitschow: Číčov, p. of Spálené Poříčí
- Tschödrich: Štědrákova Lhota, p. of Ruda nad Moravou
- Tschöppern: Čepirohy, p. of Most
- Tuchorschitz: Tuchořice
- Tulleschitz: Tulešice
- Tünscht: Týniště, p. of Zubrnice
- Tupadl:
  - Tupadly (Kutná Hora District)
  - Tupadly (Mělník District)
  - Tupadly, p. of Klatovy
- Tüppelsgrün: Děpoltovice
- Turas: Brno-Tuřany
- Turban: Borovany, p. of Bor (Tachov District)
- Turkowitz: Staré Dobrkovice, p. of Kájov
- Türmaul: Drmaly, p. of Vysoká Pec (Chomutov District)
- Türmitz: Trmice
- Turn: Trnovany, p. of Teplice
- Türnau: Městečko Trnávka
- Turnau: Turnov
- Turnitz: Tvrdonice
- Tusch: Suš, p. of Bohdalovice
- Tuschkau Stadt: Město Touškov
- Tuschmitz: Tušimice, p. of Kadaň
- Tusset: Stožec
- Tussetschlag: Břevniště, now Boletice MTA*
- Tutschap (Tuczap):
  - Tučapy (Tábor District)
  - Tučapy (Uherské Hradiště District)
  - Tučapy (Vyškov District)
- Tutz: Dubec, p. of Třemešné
- Tweras: Svéraz, p. of Bohdalovice
- Twrdina: Tvrdín, p. of Hrobčice
- Tyrn: Děrné, p. of Fulnek
- Tyssa: Tisá
- Tzieschkowitz: Těškovice

== U ==
- Udritsch: Údrč, p. of Bochov
- Überdörfel: Opatovec
- Überschar: Přebytek, now Nové Město pod Smrkem
- Uhersko: Uhersko
- Uhligstal: Uhlíkov, now Želnava*
- Uhritz (Uhrzitz): Uhřice (Hodonín District)
- Uitwa (Uittwa): Útvina
- Ujest: Újezd pod Přimdou, p. of Přimda
- Ulbersdorf: Albrechtice, now Horní Jiřetín*
- Ullersdorf: Oldřichov, p. of Jeníkov (Teplice District)
- Ullersgrün: Oldřiš, p. of Merklín (Karlovy Vary District)
- Ullershof: Oldřichov (Tábor District)
- Ullersloh: Oldřichov, p. of Nejdek
- Ullersreith: Oldřichov, p. of Tachov
- Ullitz: Úlice
- Ullrichsthal: Nový Oldřichov
- Ulmbach: Jilmová, now Hora Svatého Šebestiána*
- Ungarisch Brod: Uherský Brod
- Ungarisch Hradisch: Uherské Hradiště
- Ungarisch Ostra: Uherský Ostroh
- Ungarschitz: Uherčice (Znojmo District)
- Ungersdorf: Hranice IX-Uhřínov
- Unhoscht: Unhošť
- Unola (Unolla): Únehle
- Unterberg: Střelcův Dvůr, now Omlenice*
- Unter Borry: Dolní Bory, p. of Bory (Žďár nad Sázavou District)
- Unter Brand: Dolní Žďár, p. of Ostrov (Karlovy Vary District)
- Unter Breitenstein: Dolní Třebonín
- Unter-Brezan: Dolní Břežany
- Unter Dreihöfen: Dolní Záhoří, p. of Lubenec
- Untergramling: Dolní Kramolín, p. of Chodová Planá
- Unterhaid (Unter Haid): Dolní Dvořiště
- Unter Hammer: Dolení Hamr, now Velké Hamry
- Unterheiming (Unterhaiming): Podolí, now Bohdalovice*
- Unterhöfen (Unter Höfen): Dolní Dvorce, p. of Kašperské Hory
- Unter Hrachowitz: Dolní Hrachovice
- Unter Jamny: Dolní Jamné, p. of Bezvěrov
- Unterkörnsalz: Dolejší Krušec, p. of Hartmanice (Klatovy District)
- Unter Kralowitz: Dolní Kralovice
- Unter Kraupen: Dolní Krupá (Havlíčkův Brod District)
- Unterkunreuth: Hraničná, p. of Pomezí nad Ohří
- Unterlangendorf: Dolní Dlouhá Loučka, now Dlouhá Loučka (Olomouc District)
- Unterlichtbuchet: Dolní Světlé Hory, now Strážný*
- Unterlindau: Dolní Lipina, p. of Lipová (Cheb District)
- Unter Lohma (Unterlohma): Dolní Lomany, p. of Františkovy Lázně
- Unter Lomitz: Dolní Lomnice, p. of Doupovské Hradiště
- Unterlosau: Dolní Lažany, p. of Lipová (Cheb District)
- Unter Lukawitz: Dolní Lukavice
- Untermarkschlag: Dolní Hraničná, now Přední Výtoň*
- Untermaxdorf (Maxdorf): Dolní Maxov, p. of Josefův Důl (Jablonec nad Nisou District)
- Untermoldau: Dolní Vltavice, p. of Černá v Pošumaví
- Unter Neuern: Dolní Nýrsko, now Nýrsko
- Unter Neugrün: Dolní Nivy
- Unter Niemtsch: Dolní Němčí
- Unter Niemtschitz: Dolní Němčice, p. of Dačice
- Unterplandles: Dolní Pláně, p. of Věžovatá Pláně
- Unterpolaun: Dolní Polubný, now Desná (Jablonec nad Nisou District)
- Unter Potschernitz (Unter Pocernitz): Prague-Dolní Počernice
- Unter Rosinka: Dolní Rožínka
- Unter Reichenau: Dolní Rychnov
- Unterreichenstein: Rejštejn
- Unter Sandau: Dolní Žandov
- Unterschlagl: Dolní Drkolná, p. of Vyšší Brod
- Unterschneedorf: Dolní Sněžná, now Volary*
- Unterschön: Dolní Dvory, p. of Cheb
- Unterschönbach: Dolní Luby, p. of Luby (Cheb District)
- Unterschönhub: Dolní Přísahov, now Vyšší Brod*
- Unterschwarzbrunn: Dolní Černá Studnice, p. of Pěnčín (Jablonec nad Nisou District)
- Unter Sekerschan (Unter Sekrzan): Dolní Sekyřany, p. of Heřmanova Huť
- Untersinetschlag: Dolní Příbrání, now Pohorská Ves*
- Untersteindlberg: Dolní Ždánidla, now Prášily*
- Unterstögenwald: Pestřice, now Horní Planá*
- Unter Tannowitz (Unter Dannowitz): Dolní Dunajovice
- Unterteschau: Dolejší Těšov, p. of Hartmanice (Klatovy District)
- Unterthemenau (Unter Themenau): Poštorná, p. of Břeclav
- Untervollmau: Dolní Folmava, p. of Česká Kubice
- Unterwald: Podlesí, p. of Brněnec
- Unter Wernersdorf: Dolní Vernéřovice, now Jívka
- Unterwielands: České Velenice
- Unter Wisternitz: Dolní Věstonice
- Unter Wohlau: Dolní Valov, p. of Bražec
- Unter Wuldau: Dolní Vltavice, p. of Černá v Pošumaví
- Unterzassau: Dolní Cazov, now Strážný*
- Unter Zetno (Unter Cetno): Dolní Cetno, p. of Niměřice
- Unterzwinzen: Dolní Svince, p. of Dolní Třebonín
- Untschin: Unčín
- Urbanau: Urbanov
- Uretschlag: Meziřící, p. of Malonty
- Urhau: Ořechov (Brno-Country District)
- Urowitz: Vnarovy, p. of Vimperk
- Ursprung: Počátky, p. of Kraslice
- Urtschitz: Určice
- Urzinau: Uhřínov
- Uschau: Úšava, p. of Staré Sedliště
- Uttigsdorf: Útěchov (Svitavy District)
- Utzin: Očín, p. of Horní Kozolupy

== V ==
- Veitsberg: Prague-Žižkov
- Vierzighuben: Lány, p. of Svitavy
- Vogelsang:
  - Lhotka, p. of Tisová (Tachov District)
  - Podlesí, p. of Kašperské Hory
- Vogelseifen: Rudná pod Pradědem
- Voigtsgrün: Fojtov, p. of Nejdek
- Voigtskrosse: Fojtova Kraš, now Velká Kraš
- Voitelsbrunn: Sedlec (Břeclav District)
- Voitersreuth: Vojtanov
- Voitsdorf:
  - Bohatice
  - Fojtovice, p. of Heřmanov (Děčín District)
  - Fojtovice, p. of Krupka
- Vorderglöckelberg: Přední Zvonková, now Horní Planá
- Vorder Heuraffl: Přední Výtoň
- Vorderstift: Bližší Lhota, p. of Horní Planá
- Vorder Zinnwald: Přední Cínovec, now Dubí*
- Vöttau: Bítov (Znojmo District)

== W ==
- Wadetschlag: Svatonina Lhota, now Frymburk
- Wadetstift: Hruštice, now Frymburk*
- Wagstadt: Bílovec
- Waier: Rybník (Domažlice District)
- Waißak: Vysoká (Bruntál District)
- Wakowitz: Vadkovice, p. of Chbany
- Waldau: Valdov, p. of Jablonné v Podještědí
- Walddörfel: Víska pod Lesy, p. of Česká Kamenice
- Waldecke: Valdek, p. of Staré Křečany
- Waldek: Zálesí, p. of Javorník (Jeseník District)
- Waldenburg: Bělá, p. of Bělá pod Pradědem
- Waldersgrün: Valtířov, now Nový Kramolín*
- Waldetschlag: Valtéřov, p. of Benešov nad Černou
- Waldheim:
  - Nemrlov, now Oskava
  - Zahájí, now Lesná (Tachov District)*
- Waldhof: Zborná, p. of Jihlava
- Walditz: Valdice
- Waldschnitz: Olešnice, p. of Ústí nad Labem
- Walk: Valcha, p. of Stráž (Tachov District)
- Wallachisch Bistritz: Valašská Bystřice
- Wallachisch Klobouk: Valašské Klobouky
- Wallachisch Meseritsch: Valašské Meziříčí
- Wallern: Volary
- Wallhof: Lesná, now Nový Kostel
- Wällisch Birken (Wällischbirken): Vlachovo Březí
- Wallisgrün (Wallisdorf): Kůzová, p. of Čistá (Rakovník District)
- Wallstein: Valštejn, p. of Město Albrechtice
- Walschowitz: Hranice VI-Valšovice
- Waltersdorf:
  - Valteřice, p. of Žandov
  - Vrchy
  - Žleb, p. of Hanušovice
- Waltersgrün: Valtéřov, p. of Kraslice
- Waltirsche: Valtířov, p. of Velké Březno
- Waltsch: Valeč (Karlovy Vary District)
- Wamberg: Vamberk
- Wanow: Vaňov, p. of Ústí nad Labem
- Wanowitz: Vanovice
- Warnsdorf: Varnsdorf
- Warta: Stráž nad Ohří
- Wartenberg: Sedmihorky, p. of Karlovice (Semily District)
- Wartenberg am Rollberg: Stráž pod Ralskem
- Warth: Stráž, p. of Sušice
- Warwaschau: Varvažov
- Waschagrün: Výškov, p. of Chodová Planá
- Wasserhäuseln: Vodná, p. of Bečov nad Teplou
- Wassersuppen: Nemanice
- Wassertrompeten: Ostromeč, p. of Velký Malahov
- Watetitz: Vatětice, p. of Hartmanice (Klatovy District)
- Watislaw: Vlastislav (Litoměřice District)
- Watkowitz: Vadkovice, p. of Předotice
- Watzelsdorf: Václavov, p. of Zábřeh
- Watzgenreuth: Vackovec, p. of Milhostov
- Watzkenreuth: Vackov, p. of Plesná
- Wawrowitz: Vávrovice, p. of Opava
- Webeschan: Bžany (Teplice District)
- Weckelsdorf: Teplice nad Metují
- Weckersdorf: Křinice
- Wedlitz: Vědlice, p. of Úštěk
- Wegstädtl: Štětí
- Weheditz: Bohatice, p. of Karlovy Vary
- Weichseln: Vyšný, p. of Český Krumlov
- Weiden:
  - Pastviny
  - Vrbka
- Weiden überm Walde: Vrbno nad Lesy
- Weidenau: Vidnava
- Weidmesgrün: Vykmanov, p. of Ostrov (Karlovy Vary District)
- Weigelsdorf:
  - Vajglov, p. of Břidličná
  - Vikantice
  - Volanov, p. of Trutnov
- Weigsdorf: Višňová (Liberec District)
- Weikersdorf: Vikýřovice
- Weine: Víno, p. of Slezské Rudoltice
- Weingarten: Vinařice, p. of Jirkov
- Weipert: Vejprty
- Weipersdorf: Výprachtice
- Weirowa (Weyrowa): Výrov, p. of Blížejov
- Weiskirchen (Weiskirch): Hranice (Přerov District)
- Weissbach:
  - Bílý Potok (Liberec District)
  - Bílý Potok, p. of Javorník (Jeseník District)
  - Bílý Potok, p. of Vrbno pod Pradědem
- Weißenstein: Bílý Kámen
- Weißensulz: Bělá nad Radbuzou
- Weißkirchen:
  - Bílý Kostel nad Nisou
  - Bílý Kostelec, p. of Úštěk
- Weißkirchlitz: Novosedlice
- Weissöhlhütten: Bílá Lhota
- Weißpodol: Bílé Podolí
- Weiss Politschan: Bílé Poličany
- Weißstätten: Pasohlávky
- Weissthurm: Třebíz
- Weiß Tremeschna: Bílá Třemešná
- Weisswasser: Bělá pod Bezdězem
- Weißwasser:
  - Bílá Voda
  - Bílá Voda, p. of Červená Voda (Ústí nad Orlicí District)
- Weitentrebetisch: Široké Třebčice, p. of Veliká Ves (Chomutov District)
- Wekelsdorf: Teplice nad Metují
- Welbine:
  - Lbín, p. of Bžany (Teplice District)
  - Lbín, now Hlinná
- Welboth: Velvěty, p. of Rtyně nad Bílinou
- Welbuditz: Velebudice, p. of Most
- Welchau:
  - Velichov
  - Velichov, p. of Žatec
- Welchow: Velichovky
- Welehrad: Velehrad
- Weleschin: Velešín
- Welhartitz: Velhartice
- Welhenitz: Lhenice, p. of Bžany (Teplice District)
- Welhotta:
- Lhota, p. of Trutnov
  - (Welhota an der Elbe): Lhotka nad Labem
- Welka: Velká nad Veličkou
- Welkan: Lkáň
- Welken: Hranice III-Velká
- Welleborsch: Veleboř, p. of Klopina
- Wellemin (Welemin): Velemín
- Wellen (Welim): Velim
- Welleschitz (Weleschitz): Velešice, p. of Hoštka
- Wellnitz: Velenice (Česká Lípa District)
- Welmschloss: Velemyšleves
- Welperschitz: Erpužice
- Weltrus: Veltrusy
- Weltschowitz: Vlčovice, p. of Kopřivnice
- Welwarn (Welbern): Velvary
- Wemschen: Mšeno
- Wendrin: Vendryně
- Wenzelsdorf:
  - Děčín XXII-Václavov
  - Václavovice, p. of Klimkovice
- Wenzlowitz: Václavovice
- Wenussen: Bdeněves
- Werdenberg: Vítovka, p. of Odry
- Werenitz: Zvěřenice, p. of Záblatí (Prachatice District)
- Werhowina: Vrchovina, p. of Sychrov (Liberec District)
- Werlsberg: Vršek, p. of Jáchymov
- Wermieritz (Wermeritz): Hřiměždice
- Wermsdorf: Vernířovice
- Wernersdorf: Jívka
- Wernersreuth: Vernéřov, p. of Aš
- Wernsdorf:
  - Verneřice, p. of Hrob
  - Vernéřov, now Klášterec nad Ohří*
  - Veřovice
- Wernstadt: Verneřice
- Werth: Luh nad Svatavou, p. of Josefov (Sokolov District)
- Weschekun: Vysočany, p. of Bor (Tachov District)
- Weschen: Věšťany, p. of Modlany
- Weselitschko: Veselíčko (Písek District)
- Weselitz: Veselice, p. of Velká Jesenice
- Weserau: Bezvěrov, p. of Teplá
- Weseritz: Bezdružice
- Weshor (Weshorsch): Zhoř (Tachov District)
- Wesigau: Bezděkov, p. of Bor (Tachov District)
- Wessele: Veselka, p. of Vimperk
- Wesseli: Veselí, p. of Železný Brod
- Wesseli an der Lainsitz: Veselí nad Lužnicí
- Wesselitschko: Veselíčko (Přerov District)
- Wesseln:
  - Veselí, p. of Pavlov (Šumperk District)
  - Veselí, p. of Zákupy
- Wessely an der March: Veselí nad Moravou
- Wessiedel: Veselí, p. of Odry
- Wettern: Větřní
- Wetterstein: Třtí, p. of Sychrov (Liberec District)
- Wetzlers: Veclov, p. of Staré Město pod Landštejnem
- Wetzmühl: Vícemily, p. of Svatá Maří
- Wetzwalde: Václavice, p. of Hrádek nad Nisou
- Wichstadtl: Mladkov
- Wickwitz: Vojkovice (Karlovy Vary District)
- Wieden: Chudějov, now Žár
- Wiederbruck: Vydří Most, p. of Kvilda
- Wiedergrün: Podlesí, p. of Světlá Hora
- Wieles: Běleň, now Malšín
- Wiesch: Věž
- Wieschka: Vížka, p. of Planá
- Wiese:
  - Loučky, p. of Zátor
  - Louka u Litvínova
  - (an der Igel): Luka nad Jihlavou
  - Ves, p. of Černousy
- Wiesen: Vižňov, p. of Meziměstí
- Wiesenberg: Loučná nad Desnou
- Wiesengrund: Dobřany
- Wiesenthal: Loučné, p. of Jiříkov
- Wiesenthal an der Neiße: Lučany nad Nisou
- Wieznitz (Wesenz): Věžnice (Jihlava District)
- Wigstadtl: Vítkov
- Wihen: Výheň, p. of Netřebice (Český Krumlov District)
- Wihlaw: Vlhavy, p. of Sedlec (České Budějovice District)
- Wihorschau: Běhařov
- Wihorschen (Wihoren): Hlásná Lhota, p. of Záblatí (Prachatice District)
- Wiklantitz: Vyklantice
- Wildenschwert: Ústí nad Orlicí
- Wildgrub: Václavov u Bruntálu
- Wildschütz:
  - Vlčice (Jeseník District)
  - Vlčice (Trutnov District)
- Wildstein: Skalná
- Wilhelmshöhe: Jizerka, p. of Kořenov
- Wilimowitz: Vilémovice (Havlíčkův Brod District)
- Wilken: Vlkaň, p. of Radonice (Chomutov District)
- Wilkischau: Vlkošov, p. of Bezvěrov
- Wilkowitz: Vlkovice
- Willenz (Wilenz):
  - Bílenec, p. of Petrohrad
  - Vílanec
- Willimowitz: Vilémovice (Blansko District)
- Willmersdorf: Věřňovice, p. of Dolní Lutyně
- Willomitz: Vilémov (Chomutov District)
- Wilsdorf: Děčín XII-Vilsnice
- Winar: Prague-Vinoř
- Winarsch: Vinaře
- Winau:
  - Štiptoň, p. of Nové Hrady (České Budějovice District)
  - (Winow): Zbinohy
- Windig Jenikau: Větrný Jeníkov
- Windisch Kamnitz: Srbská Kamenice
- Windschau: Onšov (Znojmo District)
- Winitz:
  - Vinice, p. of Vinaře
  - Výnězda, p. of Omlenice
- Winkelsdorf: Kouty nad Desnou, p. of Loučná nad Desnou
- Winney: Vinné, p. of Ploskovice
- Winterberg: Vimperk
- Winteritz: Vintířov, p. of Radonice (Chomutov District)
- Wintersgrün: Vintířov
- Wirbitz: Vrbice, p. of Bohumín
- Wischau: Vyškov
- Wischehor (Wyschehor): Vyšehoří
- Wischenau: Višňové (Znojmo District)
- Wischkowa: Výškov
- Wischkowitz:
  - Výškovice, p. of Bílovec
  - Výškovice, p. of Ostrava
  - Výškovice, p. of Vimperk
- Wiska: Víska (Havlíčkův Brod District)
- Wissek (Wisek): Vísky (Blansko District)
- Wisterschan: Bystřany
- Wistersitz: Bystřice, p. of Bělá nad Radbuzou
- Wistritz: Bystřice, p. of Dubí
- Witkow: Vítkov, p. of Štěkeň
- Witkowitz:
  - Vítkovice (Semily District)
  - Vítkovice, p. of Lubenec
- Witoseß (Wittosses): Bitozeves
- Wittanau (Witanow): Vítanov
- Wittingau:
  - Třeboň
  - Vitíněves, p. of Staré Město pod Landštejnem
- Wittingreith: Vítkov, p. of Tachov
- Wittkowitz: Vítkovice, p. of Ostrava
- Wittowitz: Vítovice, p. of Rousínov
- Witzemil: Vícemil
- Wladar: Vladořice, p. of Žlutice
- Wladislau: Vladislav (Třebíč District)
- Wlastowitz: Vlaštovičky, p. of Opava
- Wlkosch (Wilkosch): Vlkoš (Přerov District)
- Wobern: Obrovice, p. of Radonice (Chomutov District)
- Wobora: Obora (Louny District)
- Wockendorf: Jelení, now Milotice nad Opavou
- Wodalnowitz: Odolenovice, p. of Jenišovice (Jablonec nad Nisou District)
- Wodierad: Voděrady, p. of Frýdštejn
- Wodlochowitz: Odlochovice, p. of Jankov (Benešov District)
- Wodnian: Vodňany
- Wodolau (Wodolow): Odolov, p. of Malé Svatoňovice
- Wodolitz: Odolice, p. of Bělušice (Most District)
- Wodolka: Odolena Voda
- Wogau: Vokov, p. of Třebeň
- Wohar (Woharz, Woharsch): Ohaře
- Wohnischtan (Wochnischtian, Wohnistan): Ohnišťany
- Wohnung: Vojnín, p. of Radonice (Chomutov District)
- Wohontsch: Ohníč
- Wohrasenitz: Ohrazenice (Semily District)
- Woisetschlag: Boršíkov, now Vyšší Brod*
- Woiten: Vojtín, now Malšín*
- Woitzdorf:
  - Vojtíškov, p. of Malá Morava
  - Vojtovice, p. of Vlčice (Jeseník District)
- Wojnomiestetz: Vojnův Městec
- Wojslawitz: Vojslavice
- Woken (bei Hirschberg): Okna (Česká Lípa District)
- Wolenitz:
  - Volenice (Příbram District)
  - Volenice (Strakonice District)
- Wolepschitz: Volevčice (Most District)
- Woleschna:
  - Olešná (Havlíčkův Brod District)
  - Olešná (Pelhřimov District)
  - Olešná (Písek District)
  - Olešná (Rakovník District)
- Woleschnitz: Zlatá Olešnice (Jablonec nad Nisou District)
- Wolfersdorf:
  - Olbramov
  - Volfartice
- Wolfirz (Wolfers): Volfířov
- Wölfling: Vlčí
- Wolframitz: Olbramovice (Znojmo District)
- Wolframitzkirchen: Olbramkostel
- Wolframs: Kostelec (Jihlava District)
- Wolfsberg: Vlčí Hora, p. of Krásná Lípa
- Wolfschlag: Vojslavy, now Hořice na Šumavě*
- Wolfsdorf:
  - Vlčnov, p. of Starý Jičín
  - Vlkovice, p. of Fulnek
- Wolfsgrub: Vlčí Jámy, p. of Lenora (Prachatice District)
- Wolfshäuser (Wolfsgrub): Vlčí Jámy, now Boletice MTA*
- Wolfsthal: Vlčí Důl, p. of Česká Lípa
- Wolin: Volyně
- Wölking: Dolní Bolíkov, p. of Cizkrajov
- Wolledorf: Vlachov, p. of Lukavice (Šumperk District)
- Wollein: Měřín
- Wolleschna: Olešná (Beroun District)
- Wolletschlag: Volovice, p. of Prachatice
- Wollmersdorf: Olbramice (Ostrava-City District)
- Wollschy: Olší (Jihlava District)
- Wölmsdorf: Vilémov (Děčín District)
- Wolschan: Olšany (Klatovy District)
- Wolta: Voletiny, p. of Trutnov
- Wonschow (Wonschau): Onšov (Pelhřimov District)
- Wonschowitz: Onšovice, p. of Čkyně
- Woporschan (Woporan): Opařany
- Woraschne: Dvorečná, now Loučovice
- Woratschen: Oráčov
- Worka: Borek, p. of Pšov
- Wörles: Ostrov, p. of Malšín
- Worlik: Orlík nad Vltavou
- Worhabschen: Vrhaveč, p. of Kostelec (Tachov District)
- Worowitz: Borovice, p. of Horšovský Týn
- Woschana: Hvožďany, p. of Úněšov
- Woschnitz: Boječnice, p. of Bor (Tachov District)
- Wosek
  - Osek (Písek District)
  - (Wosseli): Osek (Rokycany District)
  - Oseky, p. of Prachatice
- Wosseletz (Woseletz): Oselce
- Wostitz: Vlasatice
- Wostratschin: Osvračín
- Wostromer (Wostromier): Ostroměř
- Wostrow:
  - (Wostrau): Ostrov (Chrudim District)
  - Ostrov, p. of Prachatice
- Wostrowa: Ostrov u Bezdružic
- Wotitz: Votice
- Wotrotschitz: Otročice, p. of Čechtice
- Wotsch: Boč, p. of Stráž nad Ohří
- Wottawa: Otava (river)
- Wottin: Otín (Žďár nad Sázavou District)
- Wran (Wrana): Vrané nad Vltavou
- Wranna (Wrana): Vraný
- Wranow:
  - Břasy
  - (Wranowey): Vranové 1. díl and Vranové 2.díl, parts of Malá Skála
- Wranowa: Vranov (Tachov District)
- Wrasch (Wraz): Vráž (Písek District)
- Wrat: Vrát, p. of Koberovy
- Wratzow (Wrazow): Vracov
- Wrbatek: Vrbátky
- Wrbka: Vrbka
- Wrbno am Walde: Vrbno nad Lesy
- Wrcen (Wrtschin): Vrčeň
- Wrchhaben: Vrchovany
- Wreschin: Vřesina (Opava District)
- Wrschowitz: Vršovice (Opava District)
- Wrzessin: Vřesina (Ostrava-City District)
- Wschechowitz:
  - Všechovice (Brno-Country District)
  - Všechovice (Přerov District)
- Wschechrom: Všechromy, p. of Strančice
- Wschejan: Všejany
- Wschelis: Velké Všelisy
- Wscherau: Všeruby (Plzeň-North District)
- Wschestar (Wsestar):
  - Všestary (Hradec Králové District)
  - Všestary (Prague-East District)
- Wschetat: Všetaty (Mělník District)
- Wschetul: Všetuly, p. of Holešov
- Wsetin: Vsetín
- Wteln: Vtelno, p. of Most
- Wtelno: Mělnické Vtelno
- Wudingrün: Vítkov, p. of Sokolov*
- Wühr: Vír
- Wullachen: Bolechy, now Vyšší Brod
- Wünschendorf: Srbská, p. of Horní Řasnice
- Würbenthal: Vrbno pod Pradědem
- Wurken: Borek, p. of Stráž (Tachov District)
- Wurretschhöfen: Březí, now Bohdalovice*
- Wurz: Dvorec, p. of Chyše
- Wurzelsdorf: Kořenov
- Wurzmes: Vrskmaň
- Wusleben: Bohuslav, now Staré Sedliště*
- Wüstenmühl: Pustý Mlýn, p. of Brumovice (Opava District)
- Wüstpohlom: Pustá Polom
- Wüst Seibersdorf: Pusté Žibřidovice, p. of Jindřichov (Šumperk District)
- Wustung: Poustka, p. of Višňová (Liberec District)
- Wüstung: Pustiny, p. of Letohrad
- Wuttau: Butov, p. of Stříbro

== X ==
- Xaverhof: Xaverov

== Z ==
- Zaap: Zápy
- Zablatz: Záblatí, p. of Bohumín
- Zabrzech: Zábřeh, p. of Ostrava
- Zabrzeh: Zábřeh, p. of Dolní Benešov
- Zahay: Zahájí
- Zahne: Saň, p. of Višňová (Liberec District)
- Zahortschitz: Zahorčice, p. of Boršov nad Vltavou
- Zahradka:
  - Zahrádka (Plzeň-North District)
  - Zahrádka (Třebíč District)
  - Zahrádka, p. of Čachrov
  - Zahrádka, p. of Mirkovice
- Zahroby: Záhrobí, p. of Bělčice
- Zaisa: Čížov, p. of Horní Břečkov
- Zakolan: Zákolany
- Zaltitz: Žaltice, p. of Mirkovice
- Zaluzan: Zalužany
- Zamlekau: Zavlekov
- Zamrsk: Zámrsk
- Zartlesdorf: Rybník, p. of Dolní Dvořiště
- Zaschau: Zašová
- Zasmuk: Zásmuky
- Zastawka: Zastávka
- Zattig: Sádek, p. of Velké Heraltice
- Zauchtel (Zauchtl, Zauchtenthal): Suchdol nad Odrou
- Zauditz: Sudice (Opava District)
- Zaunfeld: Plotiště nad Labem, p. of Hradec Králové
- Zautig: Soutěsky, p. of Malá Veleň
- Zautke: Sudkov
- Zawada: Závada, p. of Petrovice u Karviné
- Zawada bei Beneschau: Závada (Opava District)
- Zbeschau: Zbýšov
- Zbirow: Zbiroh
- Zborow:
  - Zborov (Šumperk District)
  - Zborovy
- Zbraslau: Zbraslav (Brno-Country District)
- Zdaslaw: Zdeslav, p. of Poleň
- Zdechowitz: Zdechovice (Pardubice District)
- Zdiaretz: Žďárec
- Zdiar (Schdiar):
  - Žďár (Blansko District)
  - Žďár (Jindřichův Hradec District)
  - Žďár (Mladá Boleslav District)
  - Žďár (Písek District)
- Zdib: Zdiby
- Zdislawitz: Zdislavice
- Zdounek: Zdounky
- Zebau: Cebiv
- Zeberheisch: Dřevohryzy, p. of Toužim
- Zebus: Chcebuz, p. of Štětí
- Zech: Údolí, p. of Loket
- Zechitz: Stránské, p. of Rýmařov
- Zechnitz (Zehnitz): Cehnice
- Zechowitz: Zdechovice (Hradec Králové District)
- Zeschdorf: Těšíkov, p. of Šternberk
- Zeidelweid: Brťov u Černé Hory, p. of Brťov-Jeneč
- Zeidler: Brtníky, p. of Staré Křečany
- Zeisau: Čížov
- Zeiske: Tísek
- Zeislitz: Cejsice, p. of Vimperk
- Zeißermühl: Sezemín, p. of Poběžovice
- Zelechowitz: Želechovice nad Dřevnicí
- Zenkau: Čenkov, p. of Třešť
- Zemschen: Třemešné
- Zerawitz: Žeravice (Hodonín District)
- Zerutek: Žerůtky (Znojmo District)
- Zerwitz (Zerhowitz): Cerhovice
- Zetkowitz: Cetkovice
- Zetoras: Cetoraz
- Zetschin: Čečín, p. of Bělá nad Radbuzou
- Zettendorf: Cetnov, p. of Cheb
- Zettl: Sedlo, p. of Klíny
- Zettlitz:
  - (Zedtlitz): Sedlec, p. of Karlovy Vary
  - Sedlec u Radonic, p. of Radonice (Chomutov District)
- Zettwing: Cetviny, now Dolní Dvořiště
- Zhorz: Zhoř, p. of Vilémov (Havlíčkův Brod District)
- Ziaroschitz: Žarošice
- Zichlern: Těchlov, now Hořice na Šumavě*
- Zichraß: Těchoraz, p. of Vyšší Brod
- Zidowitz:
  - Židovice (Jičín District)
  - Židovice (Litoměřice District)
- Zieberle: Úbočí, p. of Výsluní
- Ziebetschlag: Přibyslavov, now Dolní Dvořiště*
- Zieditz: Citice
- Ziegelhütten: Cihelny, p. of Karlovy Vary
- Ziegenschacht: Stráň, p. of Potůčky
- Ziering: Čeřín, p. of Rožmitál na Šumavě
- Zimrowitz: Žimrovice, p. of Hradec nad Moravicí
- Zinnwald: Cínovec, p. of Dubí
- Zinolten: Senotín, p. of Nová Bystřice
- Zirkowitz: Církvice, p. of Ústí nad Labem
- Zirnau: Dříteň
- Zirnetschlag: Bělá, p. of Malonty
- Zistl: Dobrné, p. of Větřní
- Zittolieb (Zitolib): Cítoliby
- Ziwotitz: Životice, p. of Havířov
- Zlabings: Slavonice
- Zleb: Žleby
- Znaim: Znojmo
- Zoboles: Sovolusky, p. of Bochov
- Zobietitz:
  - Sobětice, p. of Klatovy
  - Sobětice, p. of Výsluní
- Zodl: Sádlno, now Boletice MTA*
- Zöptau: Sobotín
- Zossen: Sosnová (Opava District)
- Zosum: Ždánov, p. of Nezdice na Šumavě
- Zowalka: Zouvalka, p. of Prusy-Boškůvky
- Zubern: Zubří
- Zuckerhandl: Suchohrdly
- Zuckmantel (Zuckmantl):
  - Pozorka, p. of Dubí
  - Žďárek, p. of Libouchec
  - Zlaté Hory
- Zuderschlag: Cudrovice, now Volary*
- Zulb: Slup
- Zummern: Souměř, p. of Stráž (Tachov District)
- Zürau: Siřem, p. of Blšany
- Zutzlawitz: Sudslavice, p. of Vimperk
- Zwarmetschlag: Svatomírov, now Vyšší Brod*
- Zweiendorf: Svébohy, p. of Horní Stropnice
- Zweifelsreuth: Čižebná, p. of Nový Kostel
- Zwetbau: Svatobor, p. of Doupovské Hradiště
- Zwettnitz: Světice, p. of Bystřany
- Zwickau: Zvíkov (Český Krumlov District)
- Zwickau in Böhmen: Cvikov
- Zwieslau: Světlá, p. of Hartmanice (Klatovy District)
- Zwikow: Zvíkov (České Budějovice District)
- Zwikowetz (Zwickowitz): Zvíkovec
- Zwittau: Svitavy
- Zwitte: Svitava (river)
- Zwittawka (Zwittales): Svitávka (Blansko District)
- Zwittermühl: Háje, now Potůčky*
- Zwodau: Svatava (Sokolov District)
- Zwoischen: Svojše, p. of Rejštejn
- Zwucitz: Svučice, p. of Mišovice
- Zwug: Zbůch
