= Chamb =

River in Germany and the Czech Republic

Chamb Kouba
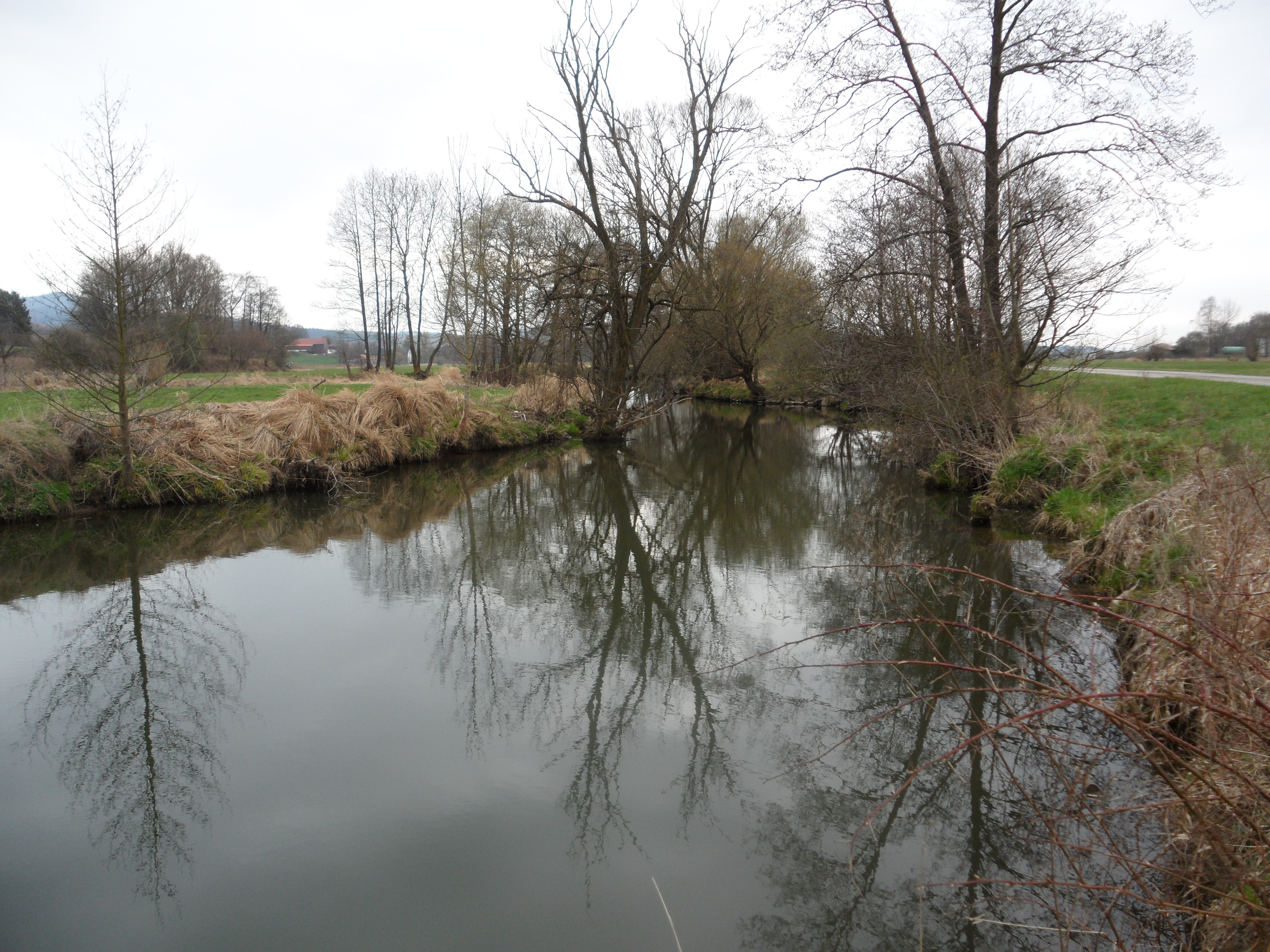
- The Chamb near Arnschwang

Location
- Countries: Germany; Czech Republic
- State/ Region: Bavaria; Plzeň

Physical characteristics
- Source
  - location: Chodská Lhota, Cham-Furth Depression
  - coordinates: 49°21′23″N 13°3′33″E
  - elevation: 526 m (1,726 ft)
- Mouth
  - location: Regen
  - coordinates: 49°13′17″N 12°41′8″E
  - elevation: 367 m (1,204 ft)
- Length: 50.3 km (31.3 mi)
- Basin size: 418.2 km^{2} (161.5 sq mi)
- Discharge
  - average: 1.4 m^{3}/s (49 cu ft/s) near estuary

Basin features
- Progression: Regen→ Danube→ Black Sea

The Chamb (Czech: Kouba) is a river in Germany and the Czech Republic, a right tributary of the Regen River. It flows through Bavaria and Plzeň Region. It is 50.3 km (31.3 mi) long.

== Etymology ==
The name is derived from the Celtic word kambos, which translates as 'crooked', 'twisted'.

== Characteristic ==
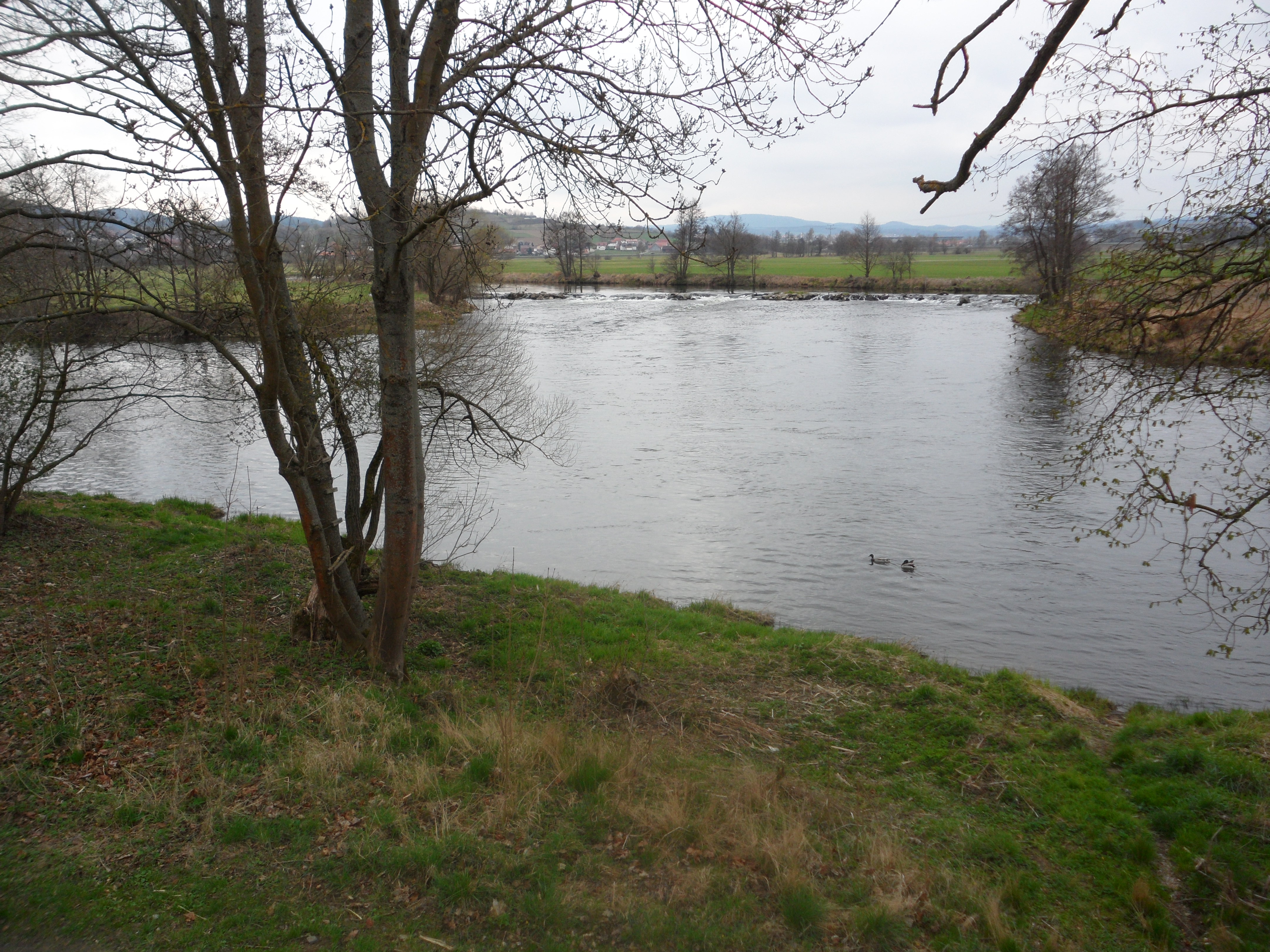
Mouth of the Chamb into the Regen close to Cham

The Chamb originates in the territory of Chodská Lhota in the Cham-Furth Depression at an elevation of 526 m (1,726 ft) and flows to Cham, where it merges with the Regen River at an elevation of 367 m (1,204 ft). It is 50.3 km (31.3 mi) long, of which 38.5 km (23.9 mi) is in Germany, 9.0 km (5.6 mi) is in the Czech Republic and 2.8 km (1.7 mi) forms the Czech–German border. Its drainage basin has an area of 418.2 km^{2} (161.5 sq mi), of which 298.0 km^{2} (115.1 sq mi) is in Germany and 120.2 km^{2} (46.4 sq mi) is in the Czech Republic.

The longest tributaries of the Chamb are:

| Tributary | Length (km) | Side |
|---|---|---|
| Freybach | 17.9 | left |
| Teplá Bystřice / Warme Pastritz | 12.9 | right |
| Zelzer Bach | 12.0 | right |
| Chladná Bystřice / Kalte Pastritz | 10.4 | right |
| Danglesbach / Spálenecký potok | 10.2 | right |

== Course ==
The river flows through the municipal territories of Chodská Lhota, Kdyně (briefly) and Domažlice in the Czech Republic, and through Eschlkam, Furth im Wald, Arnschwang, Weiding and Cham in Germany.

== Bodies of water ==
A significant body of water built on the Chamb is the Drachensee Reservoir, located in the territory of Furth im Wald. It was built in 2009 and has an area of 175 ha (430 acres). The main purpose of the reservoir is flood protection (river flow regulation). In addition, the western part of the reservoir is used for recreational purposes and the eastern part is a nesting ground for many species of water birds.

== Nature ==
A population of Eurasian beavers (protected within the Czech Republic) lives in the upper course of the river. The rising water in the Chamb due to beaver dams has spilled over the banks and caused damage to people's homes. In January 2015, the Department of the Environment allowed removal of one such dam.
