= Arnschwang =

- Municipality
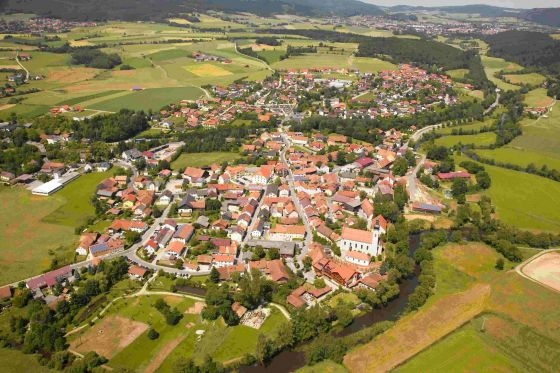

- Flag Coat of arms

- Location of Arnschwang within Cham district
- Interactive map of Arnschwang
- Location within Germany Location within Bavaria
- Coordinates: 49°16′N 12°49′E
- Country: Germany
- State: Bavaria
- Admin. region: Oberpfalz
- District: Cham
- Subdivisions: 24 Ortsteile

Government
  - Mayor (2020–26): Michael Multerer

Area
  - Total: 28.32 km^{2} (10.93 sq mi)
- Elevation: 390 m (1,280 ft)

Population (2025-12-31)
  - Total: 2,010
  - Density: 71.0/km^{2} (184/sq mi)
- Time zone: UTC+01:00 (CET)
  - Summer (DST): UTC+02:00 (CEST)
- Postal codes: 93473
- Dialling codes: 0 99 77
- Vehicle registration: CHA
- Website: www.arnschwang.de

Arnschwang (German pronunciation: [ˈaʁnʃvaŋ]) is a rural municipality in the district of Cham in Bavaria, Germany. The population was 2,004 as of the 2010 census. In recent years Arnschwang has focused on the production of environmentally friendly energy from biomass and water.

== Geography ==
=== Position ===
The municipality Arnschwang is situated in between the Bavarian Forest and the Bohemian Forest approximately 16 kilometres northeast of the town of Cham in the valley of the river Chamb.

== History ==
=== Early history ===
The earliest inhabitants around Arnschwang left the Celts visible traces in the first century BC. In the so-called Castle Wood ("Burgholz") towards Zenching is a well-preserved Celtic square enclosure, which might probably have served for religious purposes or as a central meeting or court place for the village communities in the area.

From the point of language of these first historical inhabitants can derive, by the way, also the river Chamb - the village Arnschwang its name: "wang" is meant flat field, meadow. This ending is preceded by the personal name "Aruni". Pastures in the near Chamb valley gave Arnschwang its name. From the "pasturage of the Aruni", "Aruni-wang" became "Arinswanch", during the 14th century then "Orenswanch" and, finally "Arnschwang".

=== Origin of the parish ===
After establishment of monastery in Chammünster a church could have been founded few decades later also in Arnschwang in the year 795. The extraordinary size of the parish and the Upper Paladinate rare Martin´s patronage of the church are strong indications of such an early establishment of the church. It means that the parish Arnschwang is the first bifurcated parish from Chammünster.

From the parish Arnschwang the town of Furth im Wald was bifurcated and made into independent parish in the year 1585 and finally the village Dalking in 1697.

=== Castle and village in the Middle Ages ===
The first mention of Arnschwang is documented 1173. At that time a knightly vassal of the margrave of Cham was called like this village.

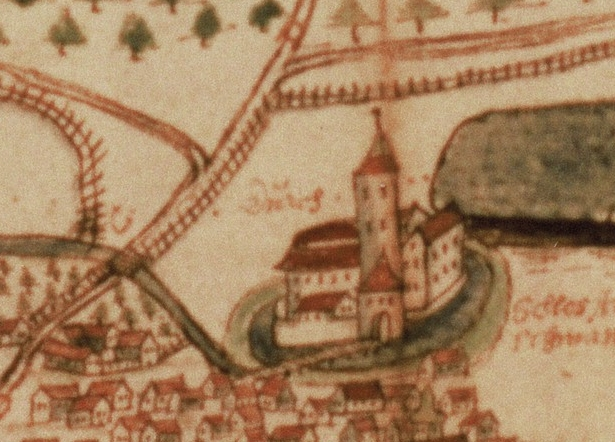
Moated Castle Arnschwang 1607

At this time the still recognizable structure of the village with the both settlement poles were established: The church with an impressive fortification on the highest point of the old village and the moated castle lying below the Chamb with farmyard and mill.

After the family of the Arnschwanger followed in the 14th century the family of the Kaelbl and later the Püdensdorfer and the Sattelbogner.

In the year 1426, the area was repeatedly attacked and pillaged by invading Hussites. When Emperor Henry was defeated with a large army in Bohemia in 1431 only Erasmus Sattelbogner, the knight of Arnschwang brought back his forces again. The folk theatre which is performed annually as The dragons sting of Furth im Wald - the so-called "Further Drachenstich" references to this event during the Hussite riots.

In 1489 the noble knight of Arnschwang Sigmund von Sattelbogen and several other knights rebelled in the so-called "Löwlerkrieg" against the duke of Bavaria. As a result, Arnschwang was looted and the castle was destroyed.

Between 1527 and 1612 Arnschwang was in the possession of the Franconian noble family Fuchs von Wallburg.

In the 30 Years War Swedish troops invaded and looted the village twice. In 1633 the plague inflicted Arnschwang and 280 lost their lives.

At this grave situation and catastrophe, the people of Arnschwang vowed to make a pilgrimage to the Mother of God in Weißenregen close to Kötzting every year.

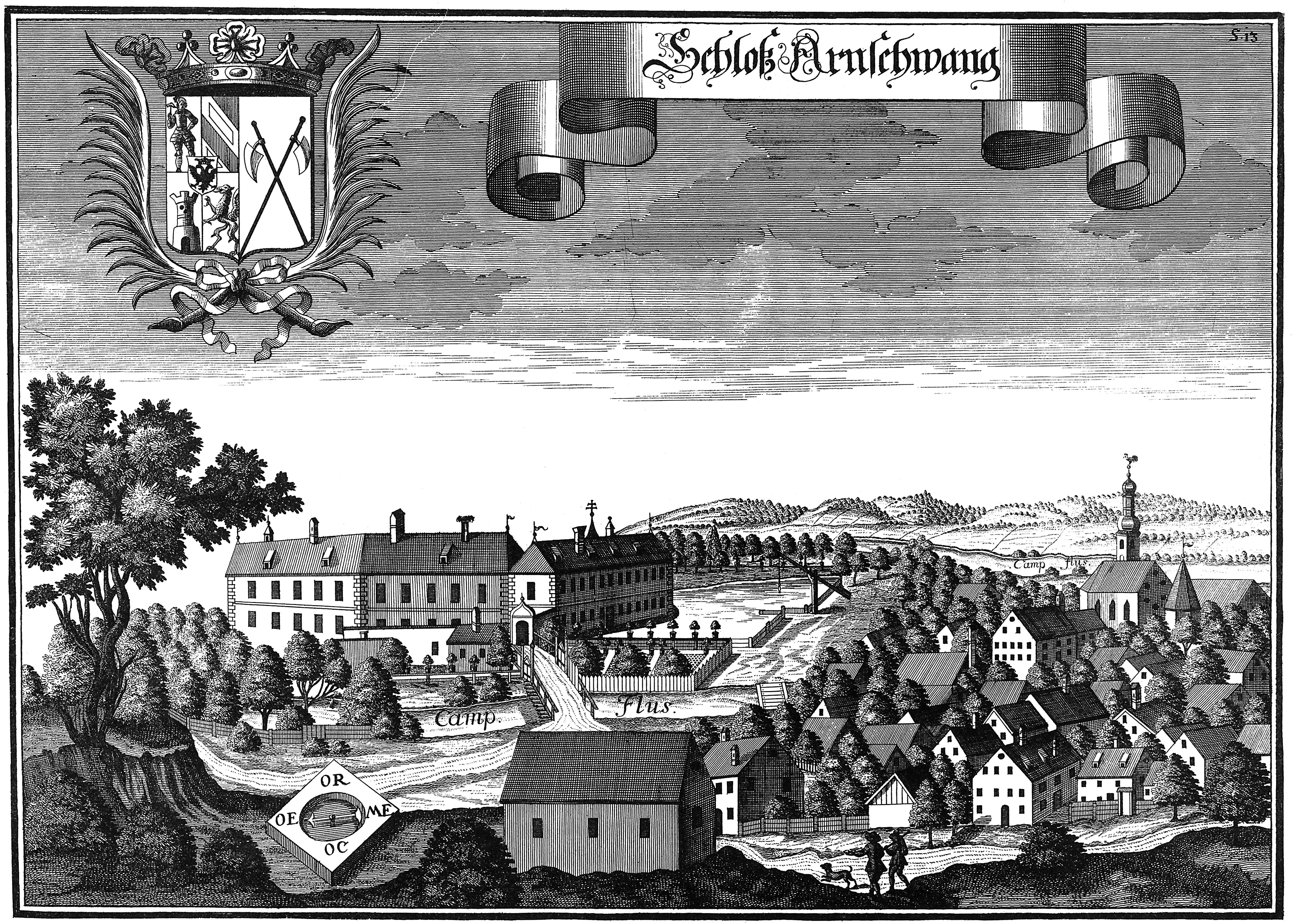
Moated Castle Arnschwang around 1700 by Michael Wening

=== Arnschwang in the Early Modern period ===
In 1722 Alois Bonaventura, Earl of Kreuth took over the Hofmark Arnschwang. In this time the grand gallery above the vestry of the parish church was created, it can be admired till today.

In 1801 Baron von Völderndorff acquired the estate Arnschwang. He started to build up a sugar factory, tried with the manufacturing of glass and boiled, finally vinegar also.

1826 took over the Bavarian government the estate and sold the possessions afterwards to different private individuals.

=== Disastrous fire in 1858 ===
On St. Michael, 29 September 1858, almost the entire village was destroyed by a fierce fire. The destruction was so severe that the school building, the parsonage and 41 houses with 142 shops burnt down, and 240 people became homeless. With a help of a nationwide collection the village was rebuilt.

=== The modern municipality ===
In the course of the municipality reform in Bavaria the largest parts of the municipalities of Zenching and Nößwartling were added to Arnschwang on 1 July 1972. After bitter opposition by the citizens of Arnschwang the affiliation of the village to the administrative community Weiding was taken back after few years again.

Now since 1985 Arnschwang is an independent municipality again.

== Politics ==
=== Coat of arms ===
Blazon: Azure, a lowered silver waved bar growing to the golden haloed St. Martin with a red garment and a silver coat, the cut with the sword of the blue coat, on the top left coming a gold, red and silver divided split plaque.

The coat of arms was approved at the 19th of April 1984 by the government of Upper Palatinate.

The community of Arnschwang is located at the Chamb (wave beams) in the bassin of Furth and has a very old St. Martin´s church. In the center of the coat of arms, therefore, the patron St. Martin was put. Besides, his sword should also have symbolic meaning, because the municipality area was often affected by war events. Especially during the Hussite Wars (1419–1433), the village had to suffer a lot. The former owner of the Hofmark Arnschwang, Erasmus von Sattelbogen has made a name to himself by his heroic fight against the Hussits. Hence the family coat of arms (divided by gold, red, silver) of the Sattelbogner family which became extinct in the 15th century, also found admission in the coat of arms. The affiliation to the territory of the Wittelsbach family is underscored by the silver and blue tinge.

== Traffic ==
=== Road ===
Through the municipality area runs the route of the Federal Highway 20 which leads from Cham to the German-Czech border.

=== Railroad ===
Arnschwang owns a railway station in the section Cham-Furth im Wald. It is served almost every hour by the regional trains of the Oberpfalzbahn.

=== Air traffic ===
Close to Arnschwang a small airfield is located at the coordinates 49 16 19,2 N / 12 46 48,0 E.

== Places of interest ==
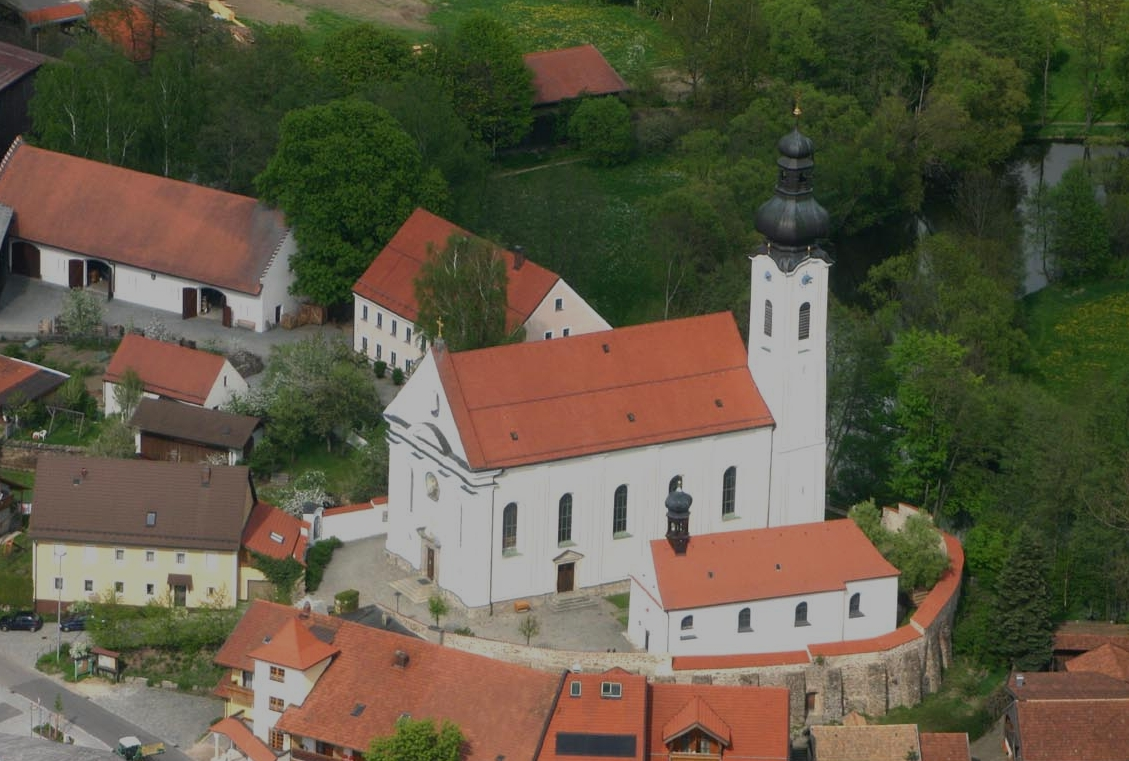
Parish church St. Martin

=== Churches ===
==== Parish church of St. Martin ====
The site of Arnschwang is characterized by the baroque parish church of St. Martin. The choir in its outer walls as well as the base of the tower are gothic. Rebuilt in 1723. 1899 the nave was raised, expanded and extended by two bays

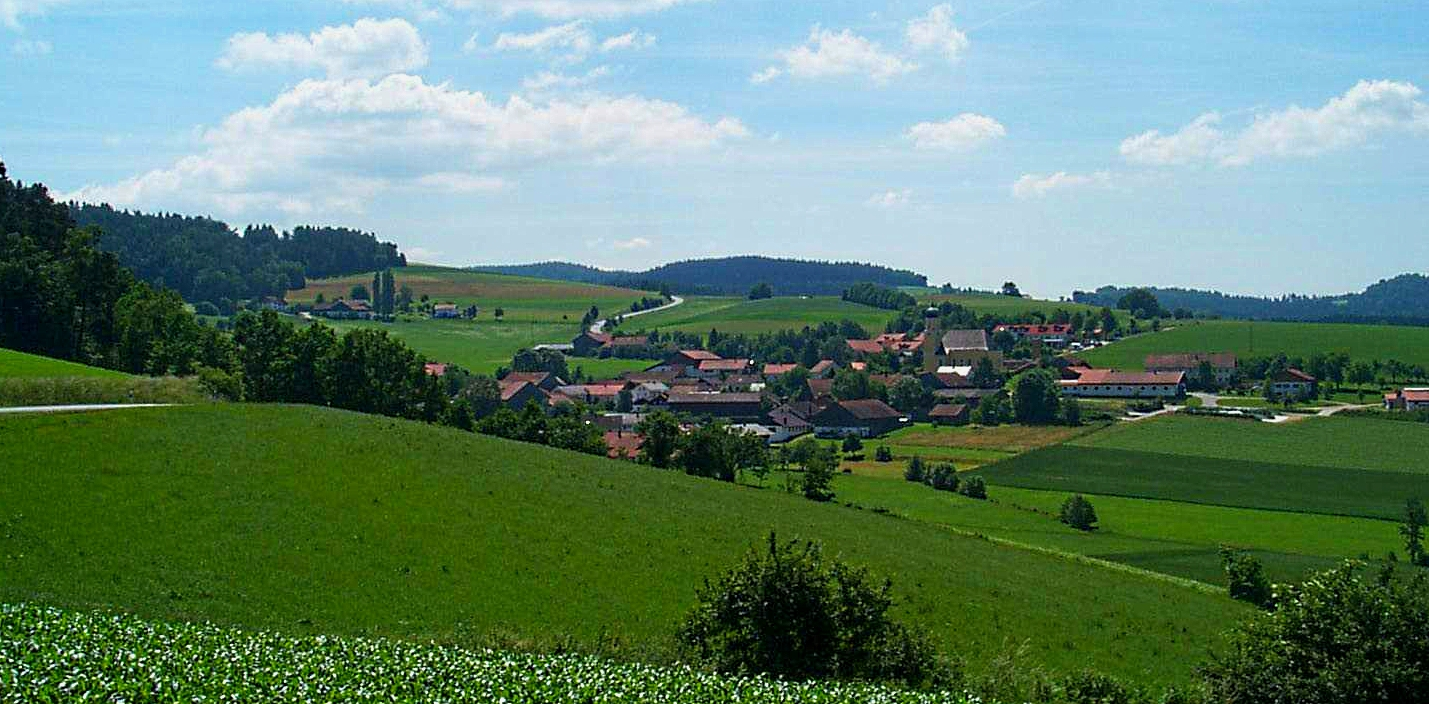
Zenching

==== Church of St. Giles (St. Ägidius) ====
In the local part Zenching there is the parish exclave St. Giles from the 18th century. In 1730 rebuilt the church using existing parts of the wall. 1845 enlargement by two side chapels. 1939 demolition and rebuilding of the church nave.

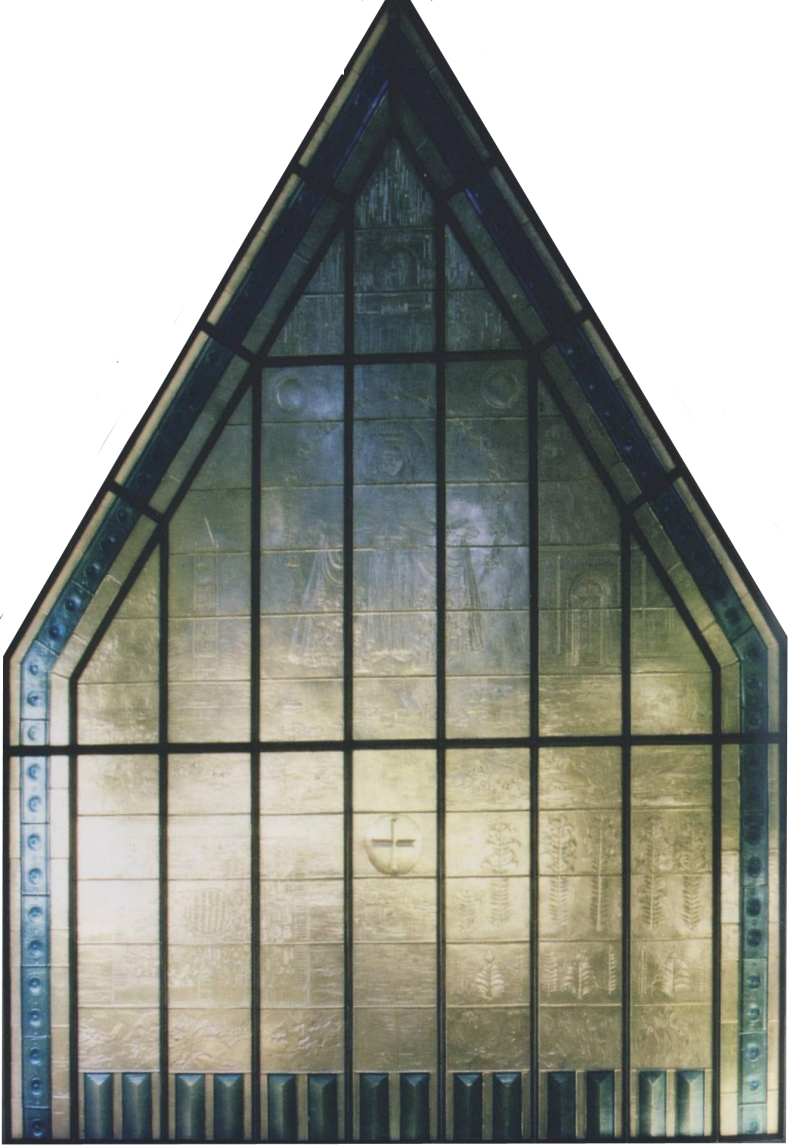
Patrona Bavariae

==== Dance of Death ====
In the soul chapel in Zenching the only Dance of Death in the eastern part of Upper Palatinate. Representation of the death in 8 pictures. Probably around 1760 created by the painter Martin Josef Hueber of Kötzting. In 1910 renewed by the painter Max Schmalzl from Falkenstein, modernized in shape and style.

==== Patrona Bavariae of glass ====
Glass facade of the chapel in Tretting with representation of Our Patron Saint of Bavaria as a Holy Mary with the protective coat. It is moulded in the year 2002 by the glass artist Bernhard Schagemann in the technology of the lost moulds. Modern interior with 14 Stations of the Cross and relief plates made of unglazed ceramics by sculptor Veronika Schagemann of the same year.

=== Center of Human and Nature ===
In the local part Nößwartling the Center Human and Nature of the Bavarian Regional Association for the Protection of Birds (LBV) can be visited in the Old Mill.

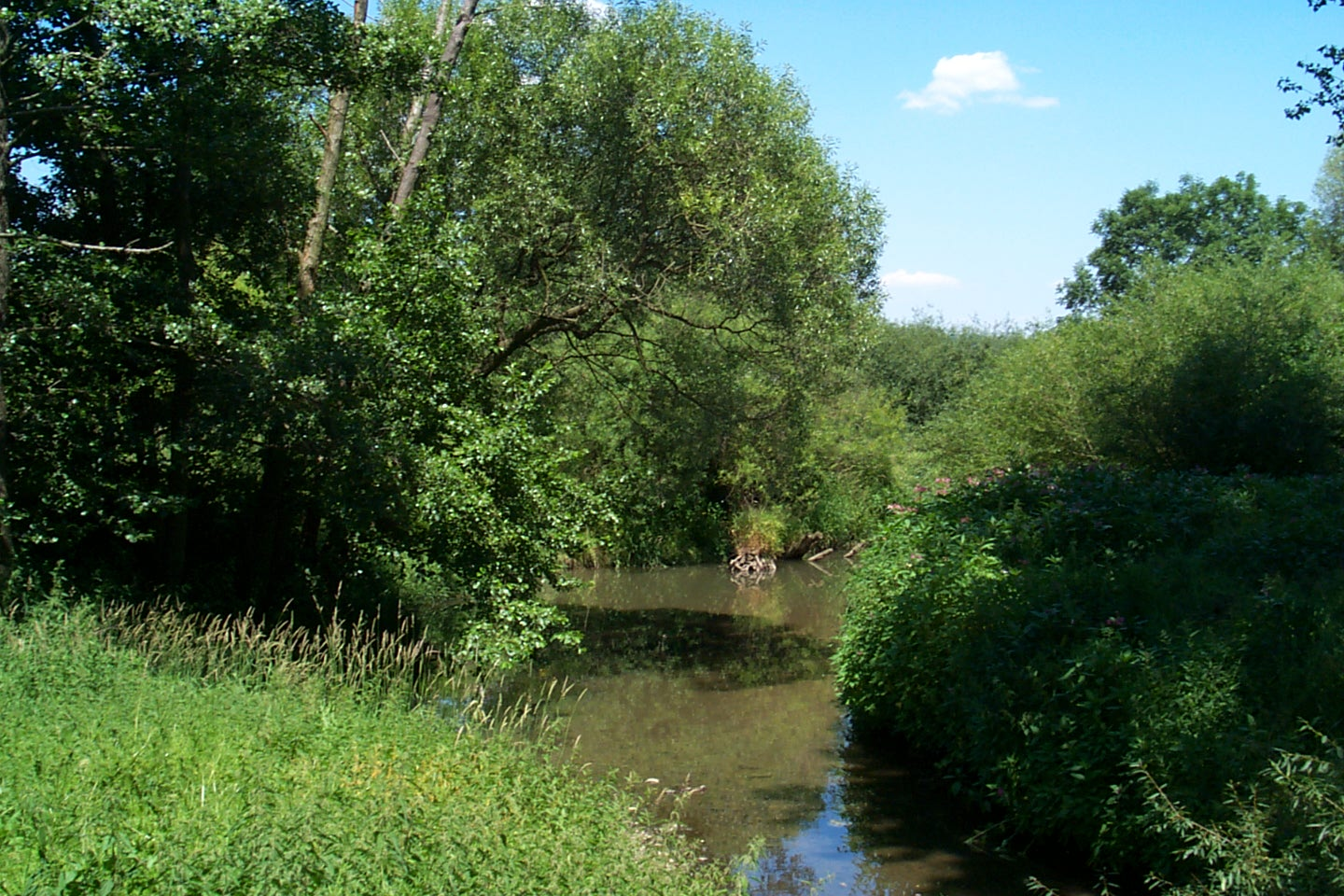
Drahtinsel with rare fauna

Since 1991 the Old Mill in Nößwartling is in the property of the municipality Arnschwang. The area Drahtinsel directly bordered to the LBV center was leased in 1979 by the LBV and by the arrangement or optimisation of biotops as a living space for rare flora and in particular fauna designed and preserved.

=== Archaeological monuments ===
- Near the local part Zenching there is a well-preserved Celtic square enclosure dating from pre-Christian times.
- The Swede´s bulwark in the Ponnholz forest is early-medieval and was built up for the protection of the ancient road between Cham and Furth im Wald.
- Old mine tunnels for the dismantling of lime-stones in the local part Kalkofen are still recognizable in the area.

=== Subterranean passages ===
In Arnschwang there were numerous of the very rare subterranean stables, the so-called "Schrazellöcher".

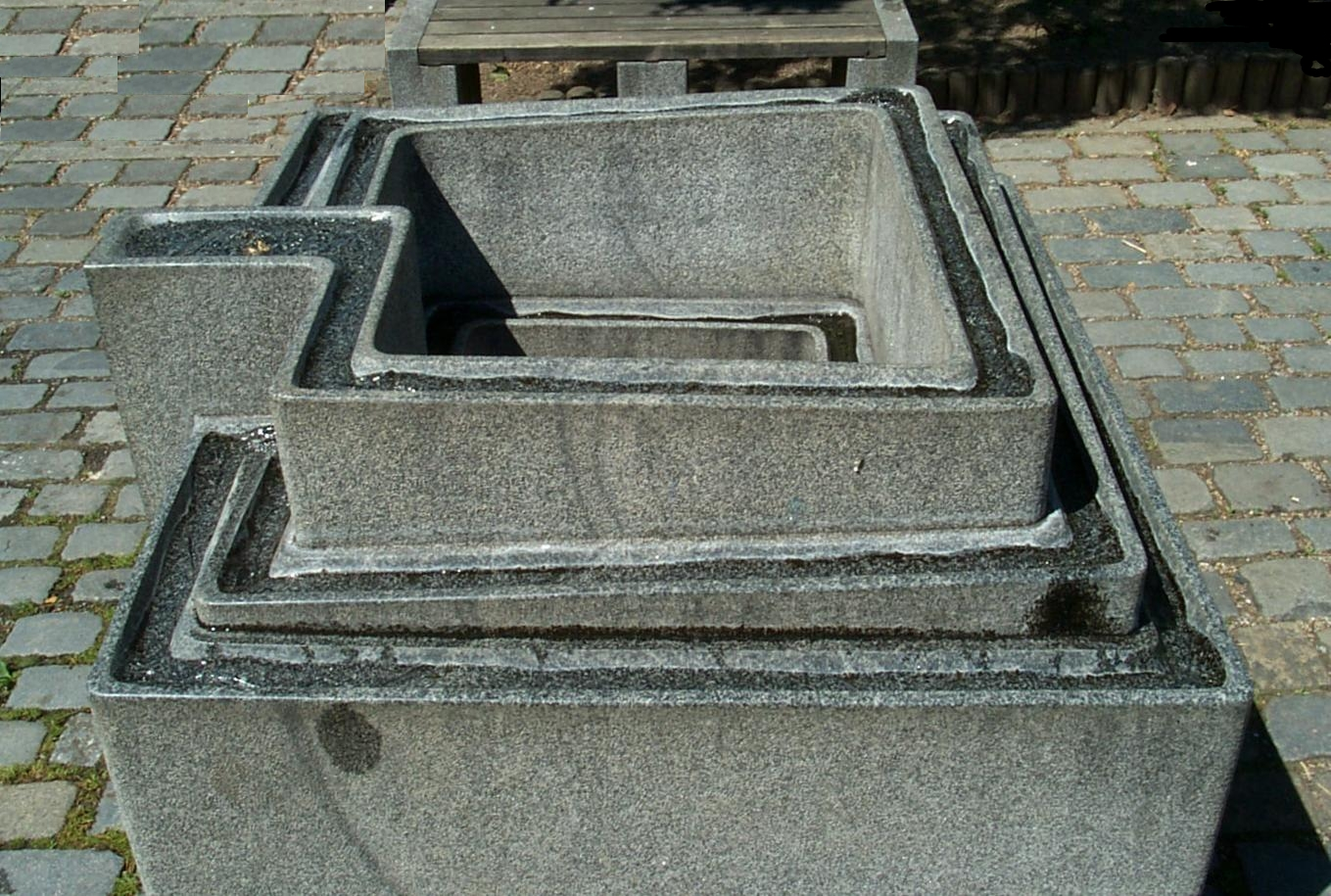
Labyrinth fountain of Toni Scheubeck

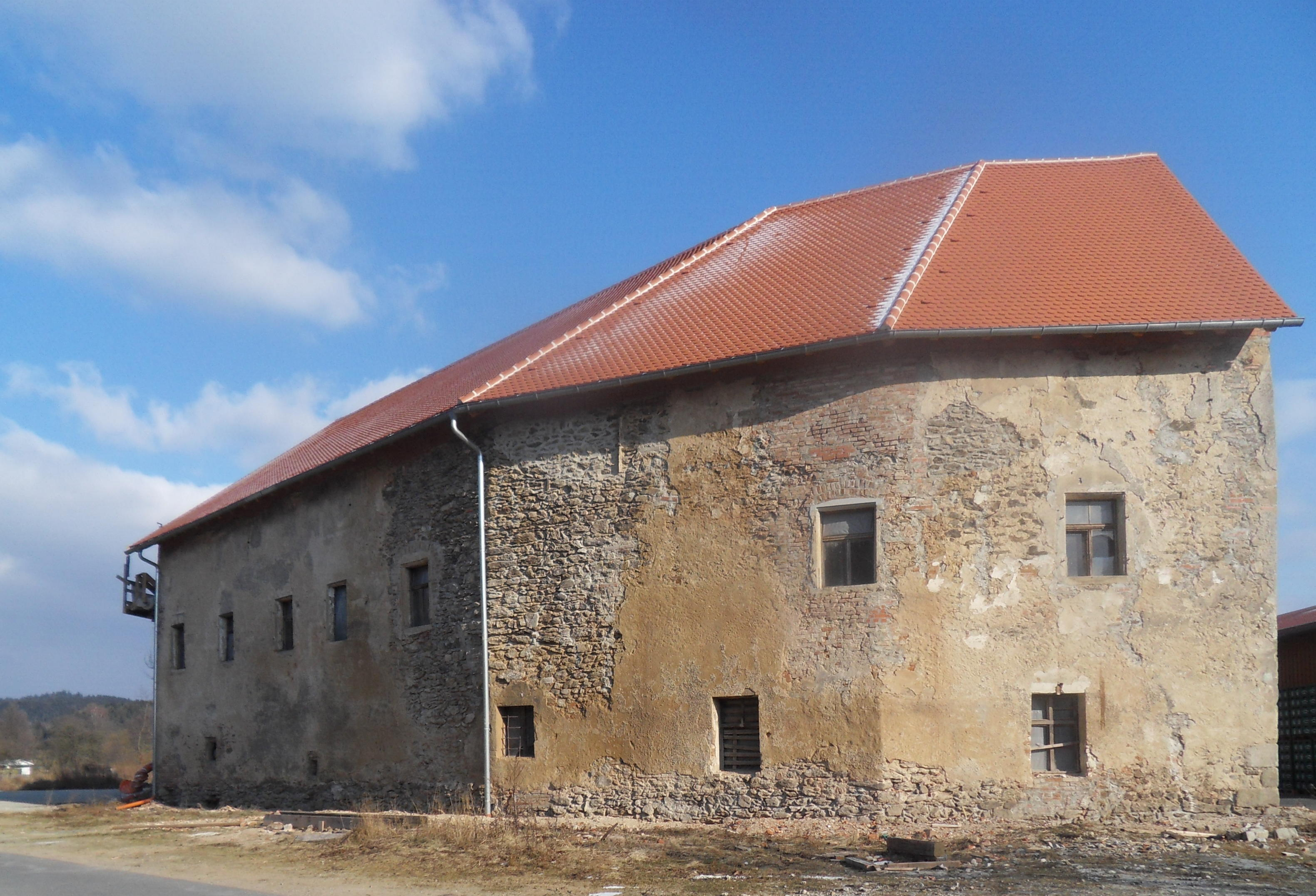
Moated castle Arnschwang 2012

=== Labyrinth fountain ===
Village-fountain sculptured by the local sculptor Toni Scheubeck on the occasion of the 1200-Jubilee year in 1995. Made of Fürstensteiner granite, the water channels polished, thereby brighter active; the remaining surfaces shaded. Source place and mouth of the watercourse in the fountain are marked with the annual figures 795 and 1995.

=== Moated castle ===
It is 2-storey, long-stretched building. We will see the remains of architectural paintings as window frames. Of the original and the irregular three-winged palace, only the west wing has been preserved. The ground floor with parts of the upper floor still belong to the structural fabric of the 14/15th century. In the following construction phases numerous changes in the building have been carried out. At the beginning of the 20th century one floor was demolished. Since 2010 the building will be radically redeveloped.
