= Všeruby (Domažlice District) =

- Market town
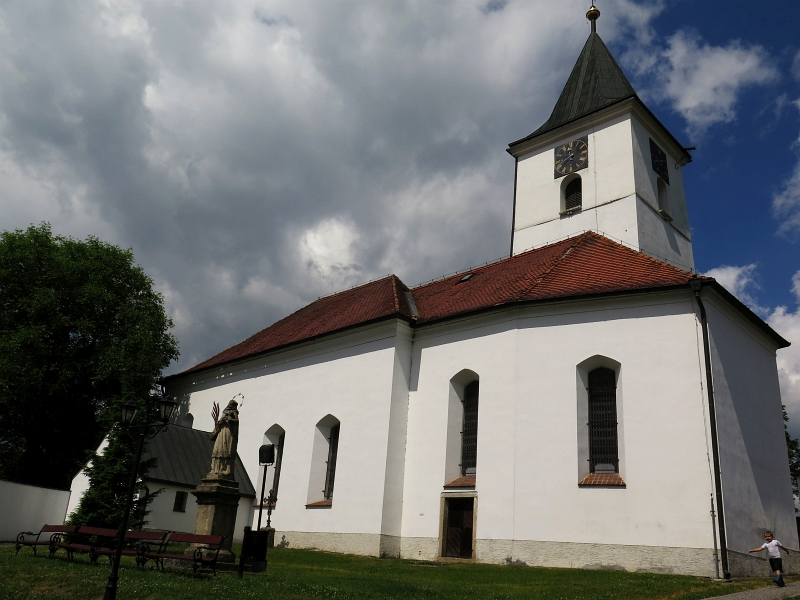
- Church of Saint Michael the Archangel

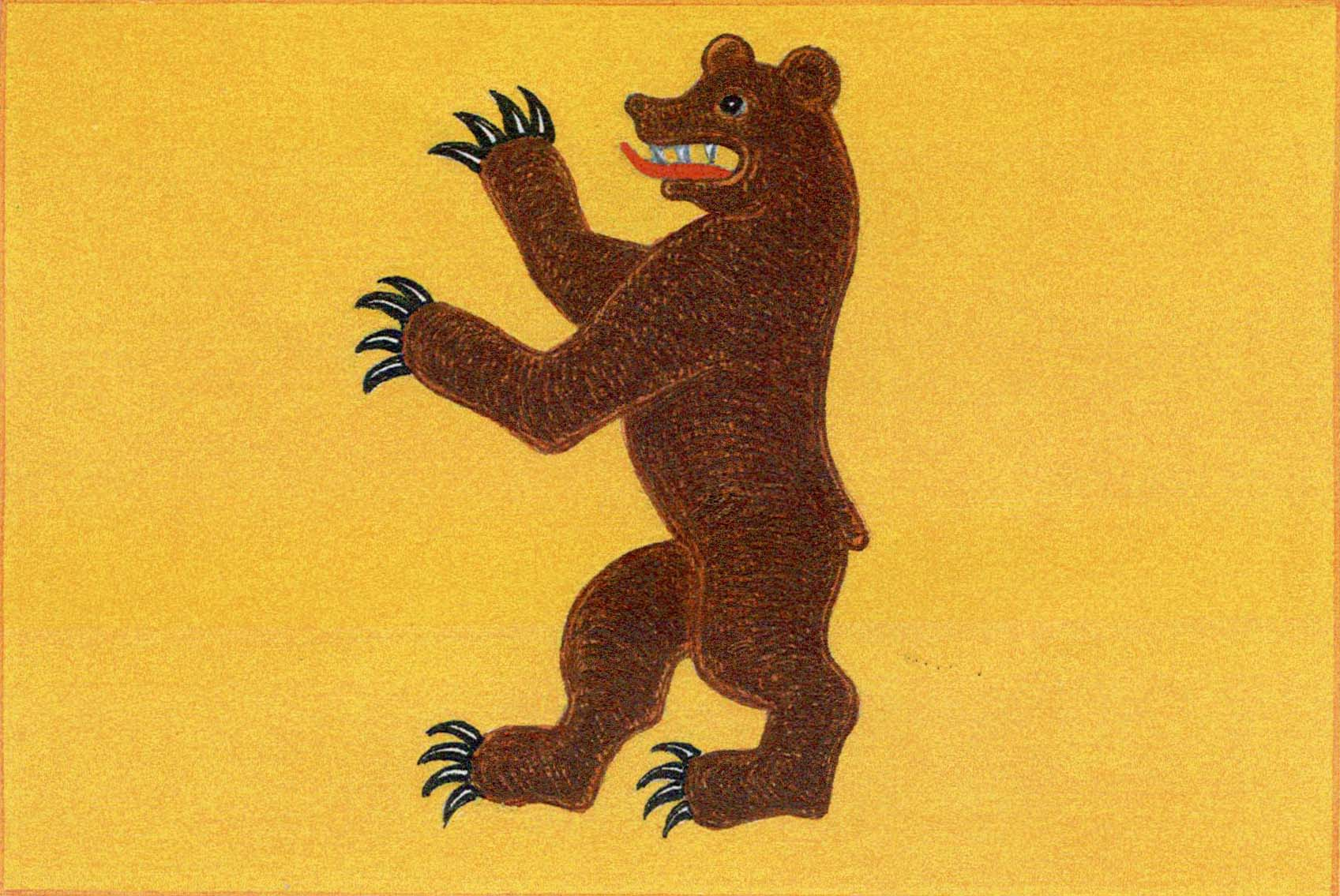
- Flag Coat of arms

- Location in the Czech Republic
- Coordinates: 49°20′34″N 12°59′12″E
- Country: Czech Republic
- Region: Plzeň
- District: Domažlice
- First mentioned: 1570

Area
  - Total: 38.49 km^{2} (14.86 sq mi)
- Elevation: 437 m (1,434 ft)

Population (2026-01-01)
  - Total: 806
  - Density: 20.9/km^{2} (54.2/sq mi)
- Time zone: UTC+1 (CET)
  - Summer (DST): UTC+2 (CEST)
- Postal code: 345 07
- Website: www.vseruby.info

Všeruby (Czech pronunciation: [ˈfʃɛrubɪ]; German: Neumark) is a market town in the Domažlice District in the Plzeň Region of the Czech Republic. It has about 800 inhabitants.

== Administrative division ==
Všeruby consists of ten municipal parts (in brackets population according to the 2021 census):

- Všeruby (413)
- Brůdek (71)
- Chalupy (10)
- Hájek (88)
- Hyršov (94)
- Kosteliště (1)
- Maxov (41)
- Pláně (11)
- Pomezí (12)
- Studánky (3)

== Etymology ==
The name Všeruby is probably derived from the Czech words vše ('all') and rubati ('to chop'). That would mean it was a settlement of lumberjacks. The initial German name of Všeruby was Neumarkt ('new market'), but due to simplified pronunciation in Czech, the name was distorted to Neumark.

== Geography ==
Všeruby is located about 12 kilometres (7 mi) south of Domažlice and 52 km (32 mi) southwest of Plzeň, on the border with Germany. It lies in the Cham-Furth Depression. The highest point is at 574 m (1,883 ft) above sea level. The Chamb River flows through the eastern part of the municipal territory and then forms a part of the Czech–German border. The stream Hájecký potok, a tributary of the Chamb, originates here and supplies the fishpond Všerubský rybník, a large fishpond in the centre of Všeruby.

== History ==
The first written mention of Všeruby is from 1570, when it was promoted to a market town. It was then a part of the Rýzmberk estate, owned by the Lords of Gutštejn. The owners of Všeruby often changed and included various less prominent noble families. From 1697 until the establishment of an independent municipality in 1848, Všeruby was a property of the Stadion family.

At the end of World War II, on 4 May 1945, the German 11th Panzer Division under command of General Wend von Wietersheim surrendered to the US 90th Infantry Division at Všeruby.

== Demographics ==
Historical population

Year	Pop.	±%
1869	3,340	—
1880	3,419	+2.4%
1890	3,076	−10.0%
1900	2,965	−3.6%
1910	3,010	+1.5%

Year	Pop.	±%
1921	2,893	−3.9%
1930	2,773	−4.1%
1950	1,146	−58.7%
1961	950	−17.1%
1970	1,027	+8.1%

Year	Pop.	±%
1980	931	−9.3%
1991	833	−10.5%
2001	856	+2.8%
2011	796	−7.0%
2021	744	−6.5%

Source: Censuses

== Transport ==
There are no railways or major roads passing through the municipality. On the Czech–German border is the road border crossing Všeruby / Eschlkam.

== Sights ==
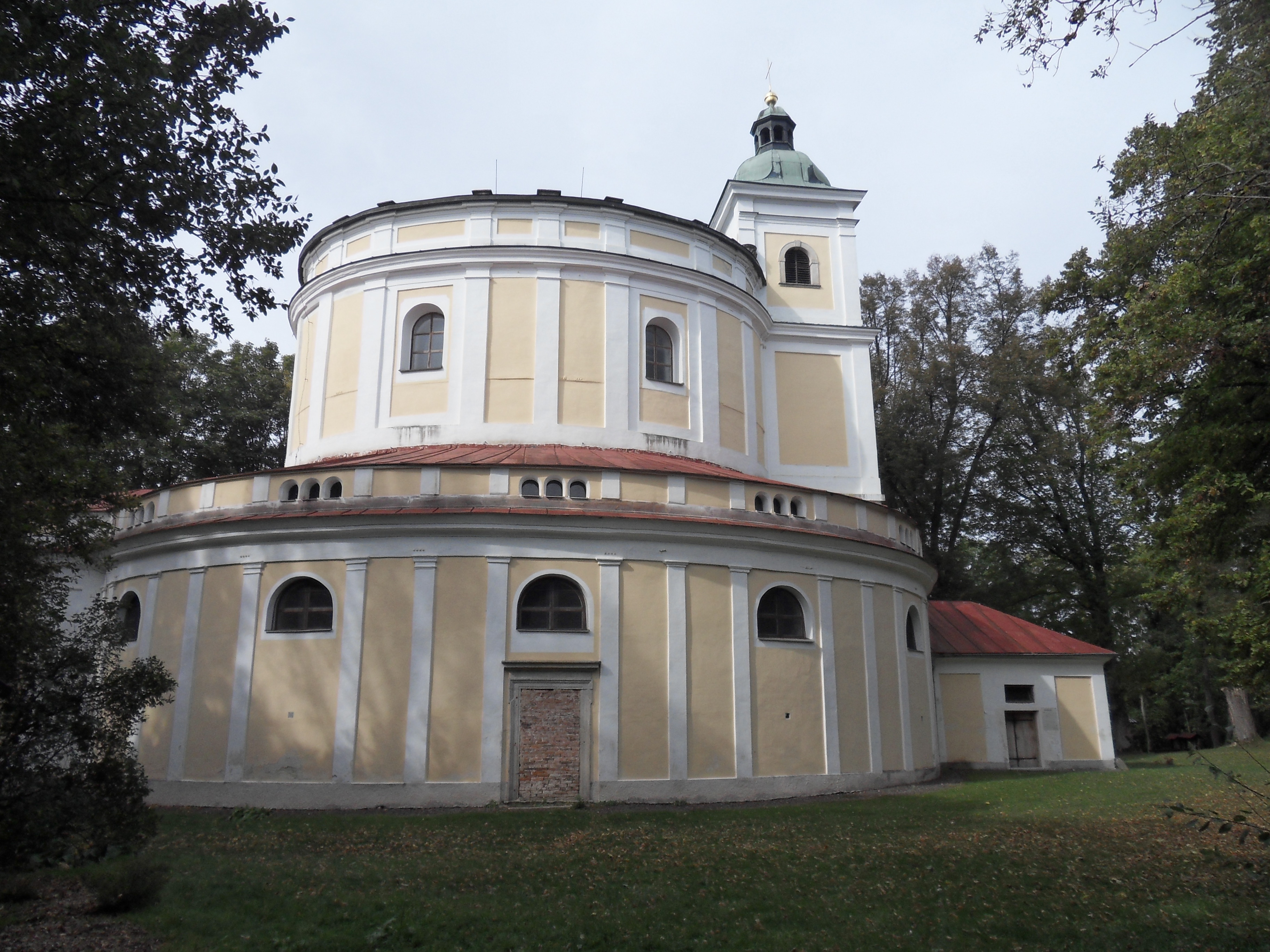
Church of Saint Anne

The main landmark of Všeruby is the Church of Saint Michael the Archangel. It was built in the Renaissance style in 1628–1650. A chapel was added to the church in the 18th century. The present appearance of the church is a result of the reconstruction in the second half of the 19th century, after it was damaged by a fire.

Church of Saint Anne is located in Hájek. It was built in the Baroque style in 1712–1717 on the site of an old wooden chapel. It is a pilgrimage site.
