= Všeruby =

Všeruby may refer to places in the Czech Republic:

- Všeruby (Domažlice District), a market town in the Plzeň Region
- Všeruby (Plzeň-North District), a town in the Plzeň Region
