= Chammünster Abbey =

Monastery in Bavaria, Germany

Coordinates: 49°12′41″N 12°41′39″E

Chammünster Abbey (German: Kloster Chammünster) was a Benedictine monastery formerly located at Chammünster, now part of the town of Cham, in Bavaria, Germany.

It was supposedly founded in 739 by Duke Odilo of Bavaria, who reigned from 736 to 748, and settled by monks of St. Emmeram's Abbey in Regensburg. It was dedicated to the Assumption of the Virgin Mary.

The first documentary reference is dated 819. The monastery was of great significance as a missionary centre not only for the Bavarian Forest but also for part of Bohemia. It was destroyed in the Hungarian invasions of the early 10th century.

The supposed establishment here in 1016 of a house of Augustinian Canons by Emperor Henry II is apocryphal.
