= Kdyně =

- Town
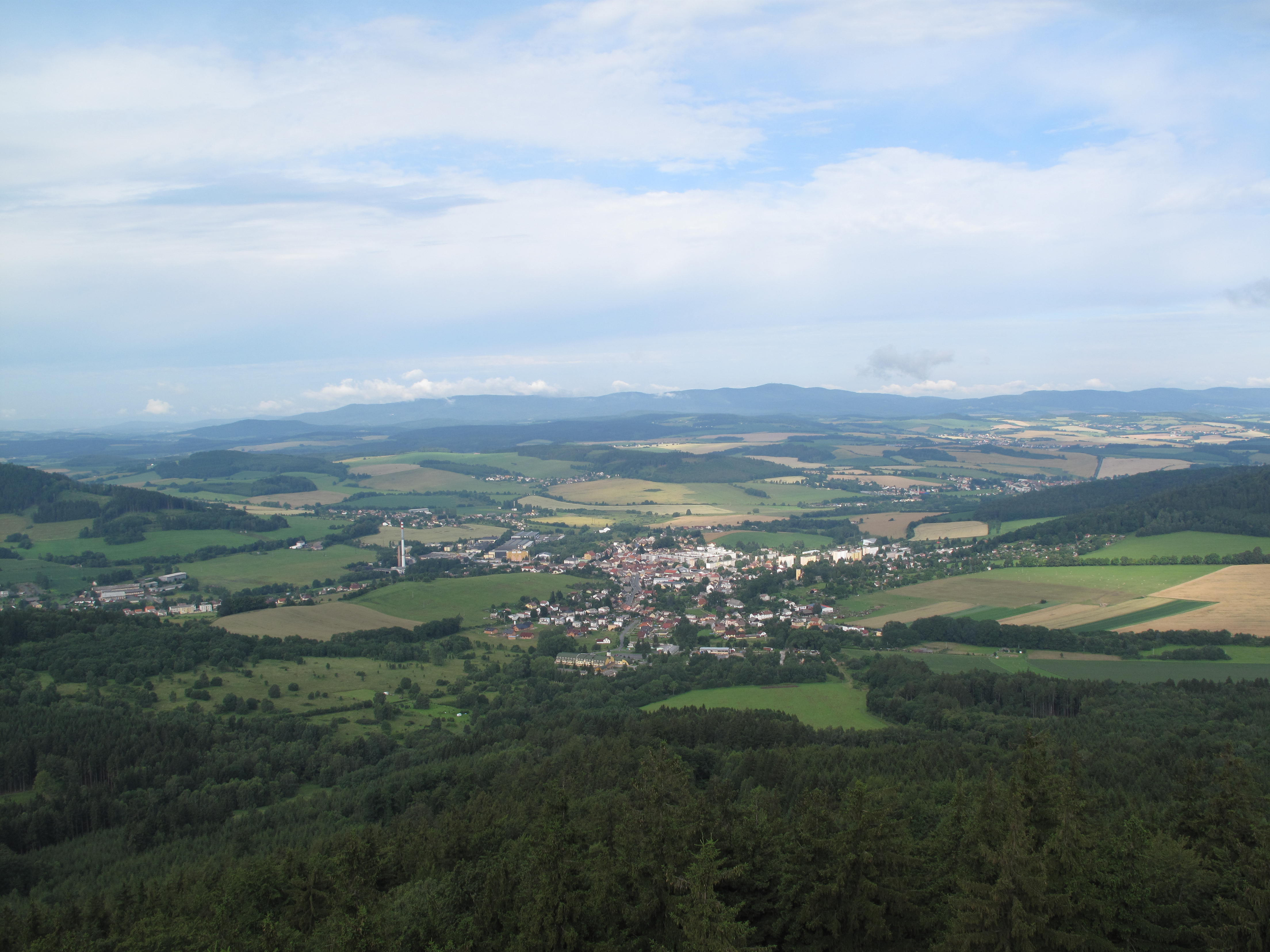
- View from the east

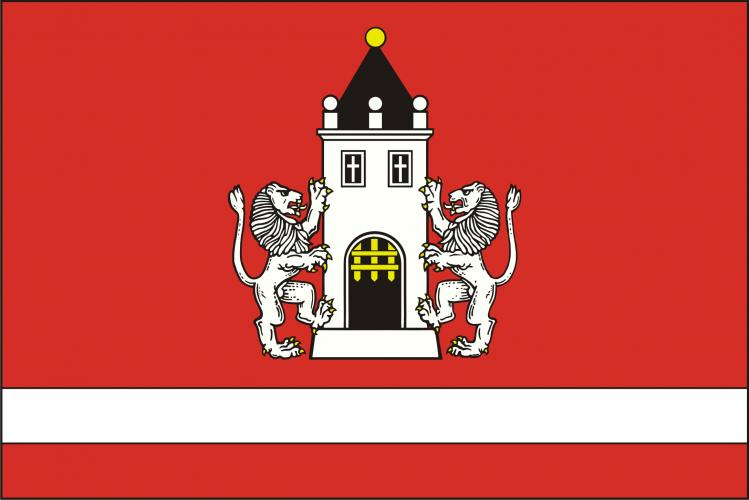
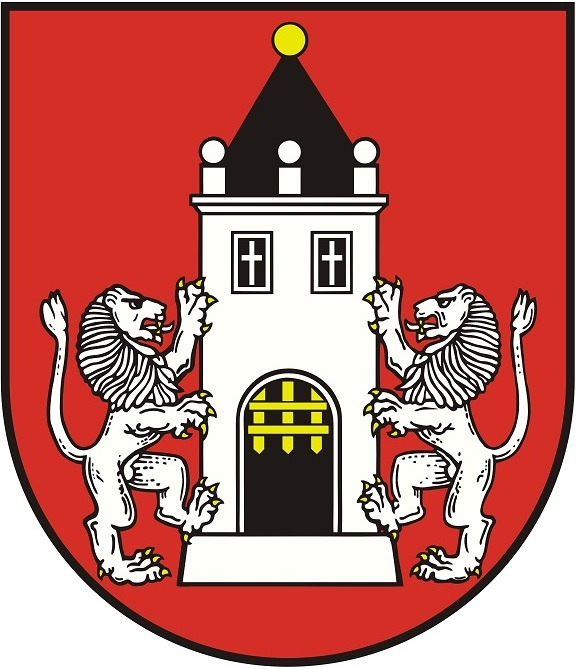
- Flag Coat of arms

- Location in the Czech Republic
- Coordinates: 49°23′26″N 13°2′18″E
- Country: Czech Republic
- Region: Plzeň
- District: Domažlice
- First mentioned: 1369

Government
  - Mayor: Oskar Hamrus

Area
  - Total: 28.74 km^{2} (11.10 sq mi)
- Elevation: 455 m (1,493 ft)

Population (2026-01-01)
  - Total: 5,132
  - Density: 178.6/km^{2} (462.5/sq mi)
- Time zone: UTC+1 (CET)
  - Summer (DST): UTC+2 (CEST)
- Postal code: 345 06
- Website: www.kdyne.cz

Kdyně (Czech pronunciation: [ˈɡdɪɲɛ]; German: Neugedein) is a town in Domažlice District in the Plzeň Region of the Czech Republic. It has about 5,100 inhabitants. The town is located on the border between the Cham-Furth Depression and Švihov Highlands. The most important monument of Kdyně is the Church of Saint Nicholas.

== Administrative division ==
Kdyně consists of ten municipal parts (in brackets population according to the 2021 census):

- Kdyně (3,875)
- Branišov (7)
- Dobříkov (65)
- Hluboká (350)
- Modlín (8)
- Nové Chalupy (11)
- Podzámčí (78)
- Prapořiště (417)
- Smržovice (72)
- Starec (116)

== Etymology ==
The name has its origin in the Middle High German word gedinge (meaning 'court', 'contract', 'condition') and is related to the name of the Polish city of Gdynia. The name was given to the settlement after its foundation probably according to the work regulations, which were a novelty at the time.

== Geography ==
Kdyně is located about 9 kilometres (6 mi) southeast of Domažlice and 44 km (27 mi) southwest of Plzeň. It lies mostly in the Cham-Furth Depression. The northeastern part of the municipality extends into the Švihov Highlands and contains the highest point of Kdyně, the hill Koráb at 775 m (2,543 ft) above sea level. The stream Zahořanský potok flows through the town.

== History ==
The first written mention of Kdyně is from 1396, but the settlement was founded in the 13th century at the latest. In 1508, Kdyně was referred to as a town for the first time. The oldest textile manufactory in Bohemia was founded here in 1696. Kdyně has been involved in textile production for hundreds of years.

== Demographics ==
Historical population

Year	Pop.	±%
1869	4,189	—
1880	4,456	+6.4%
1890	4,266	−4.3%
1900	4,646	+8.9%
1910	5,022	+8.1%

Year	Pop.	±%
1921	4,856	−3.3%
1930	5,138	+5.8%
1950	4,025	−21.7%
1961	4,193	+4.2%
1970	4,784	+14.1%

Year	Pop.	±%
1980	4,802	+0.4%
1991	4,369	−9.0%
2001	4,900	+12.2%
2011	5,197	+6.1%
2021	4,999	−3.8%

Source: Censuses

== Transport ==
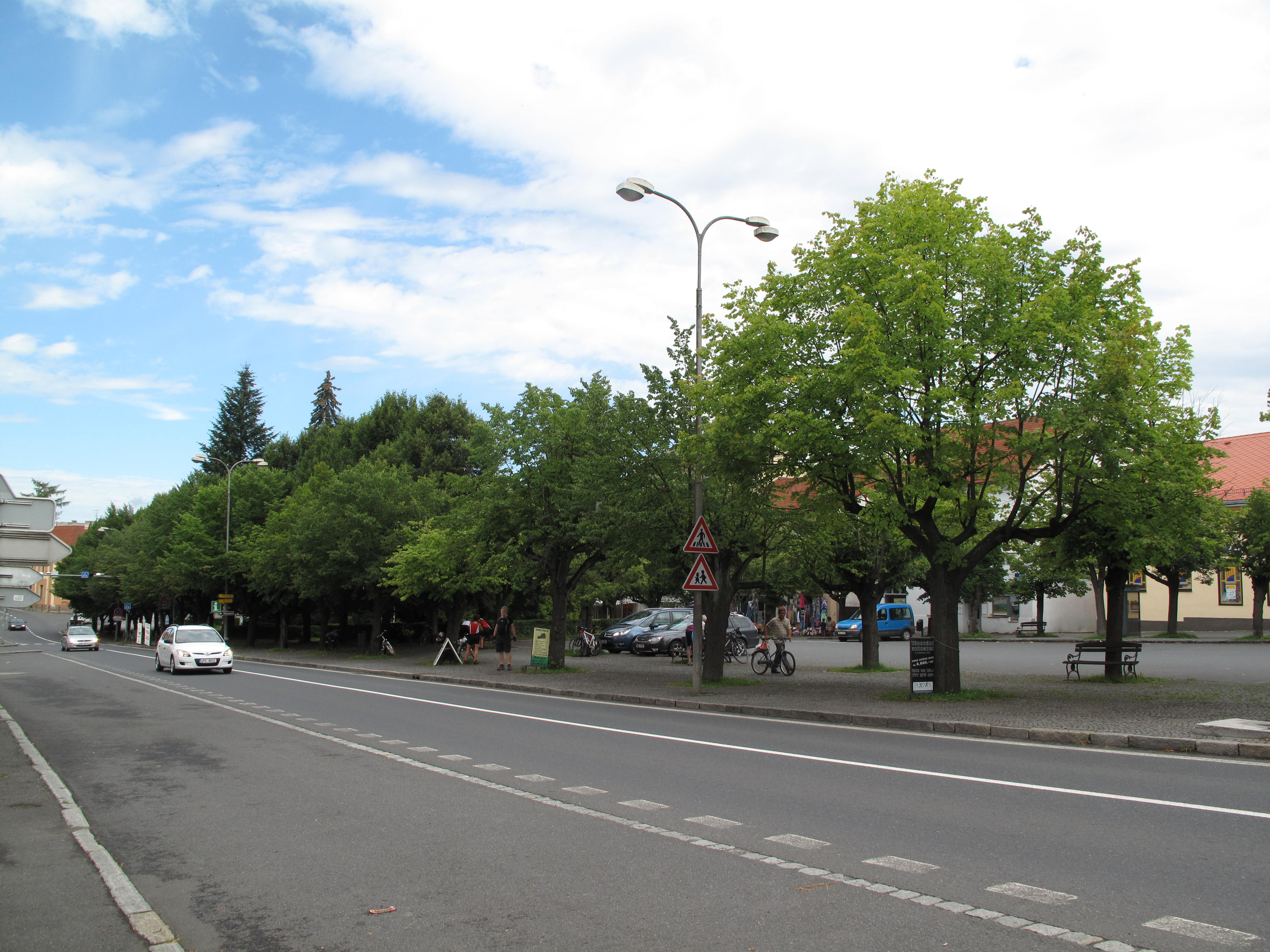
Town square

The I/22 road (the section from Klatovy to Domažlice) runs through the town.

Kdyně is located on the railway line Klatovy–Domažlice.

== Sights ==
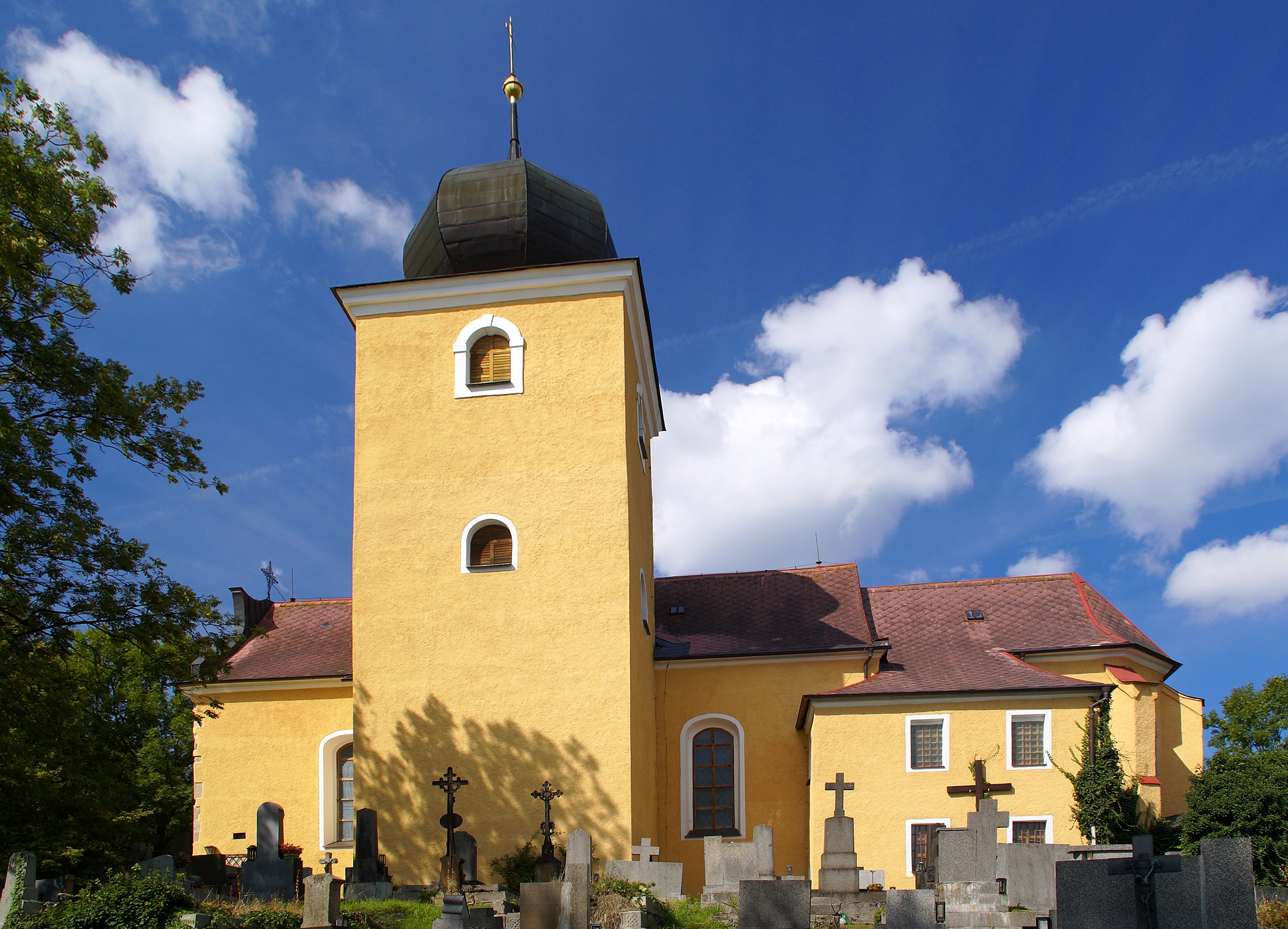
Church of Saint Nicholas

The main landmark of Kdyně is the Church of Saint Nicholas. It was founded in the second half of the 14th century and enlarged in 1763–1768.

The Borderland Museum has exhibitions dedicated to the history of the sub-region, the specifics of the border (trade, smuggling, etc.) and crafts, especially the tradition of the textile industry in the town.

Dům v kožichu (lit. 'house in a fur coat') from around 1780 is one of the oldest preserved houses in Kdyně. It is a cultural monument and part of the Borderland Museum, which illustrates the living of previous generations in this house and the way of life.

The Jewish synagogue was opened in 1863 and it served religious life until 1936. Today it serves cultural purposes and contains an exhibition on the history of the town's Jewish population. This Neo-Romanesque synagogue contains a unique mikveh. After the mikveh was abolished in 1940, it was rebuilt in 2008 and it is the only mikveh in Central Europe from the 21st century.

Rýzmberk Castle on the hill Rýzmberk is a ruin of a castle from the second half of the 13th century. It contains a 13 m (43 ft) high stone lookout tower built in 1848.

On the top of the hill Koráb, there is the 30 m (98 ft) high Koráb observation tower.

== Gallery ==
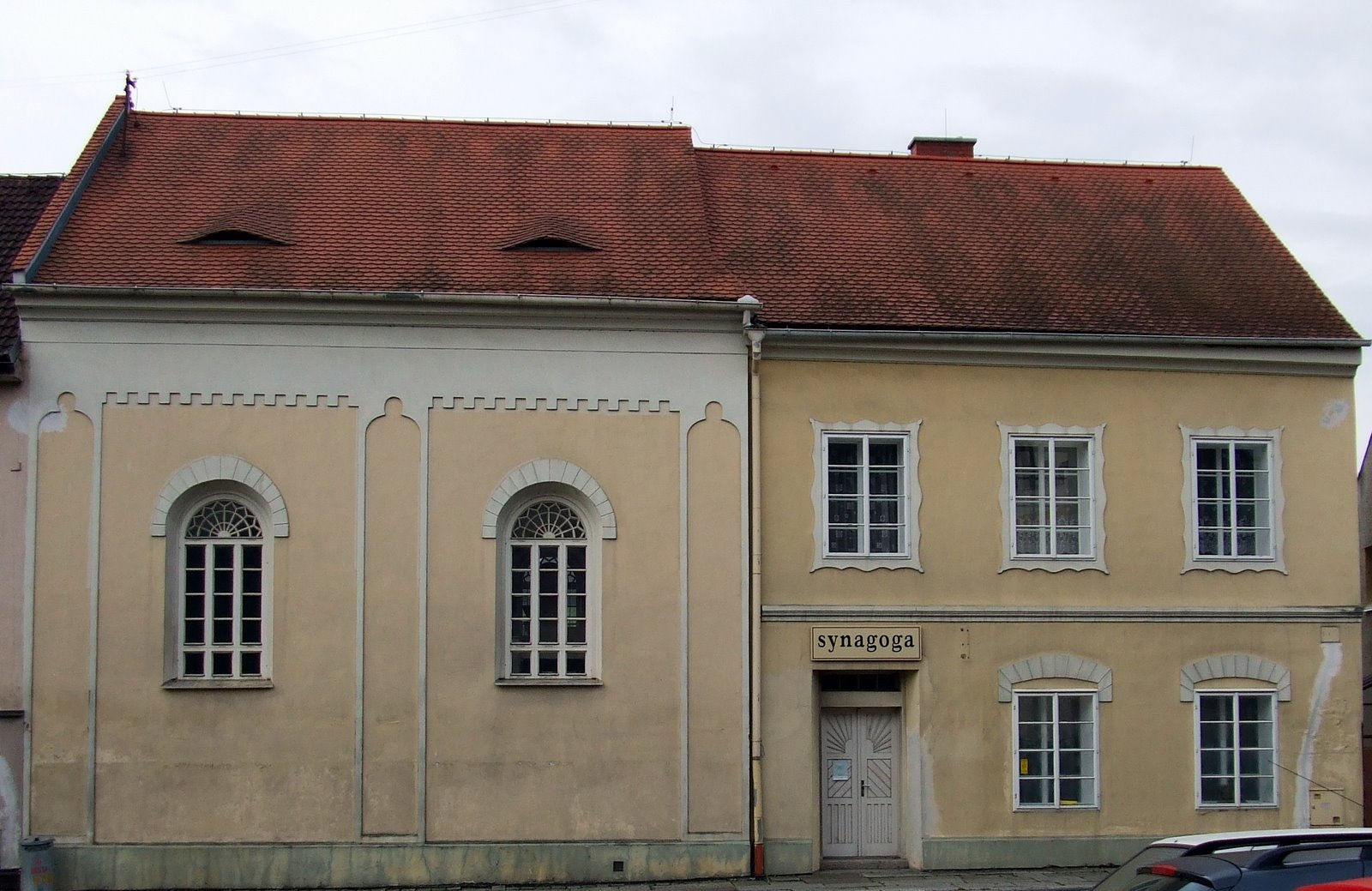
Synagogue

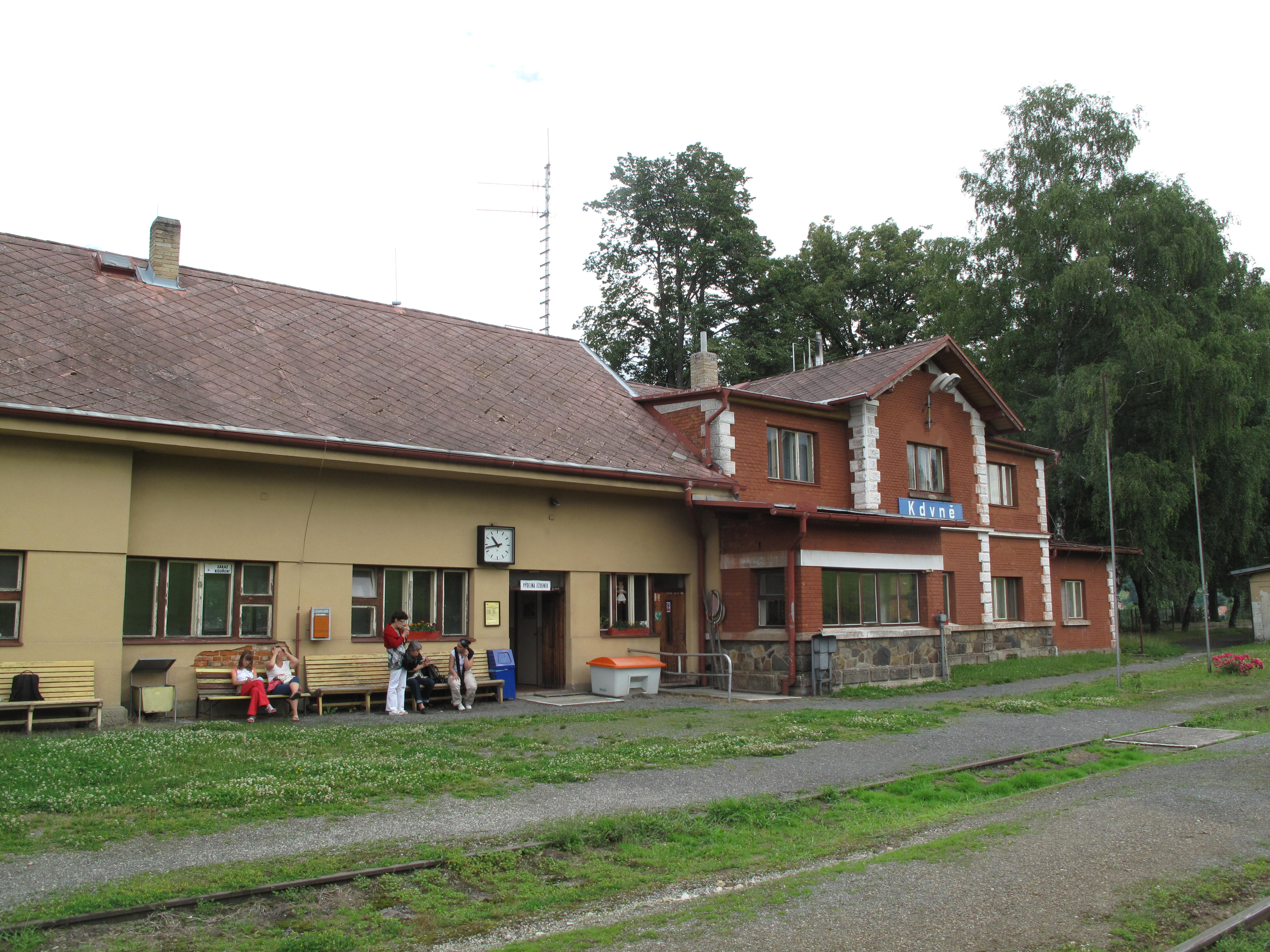
Train station

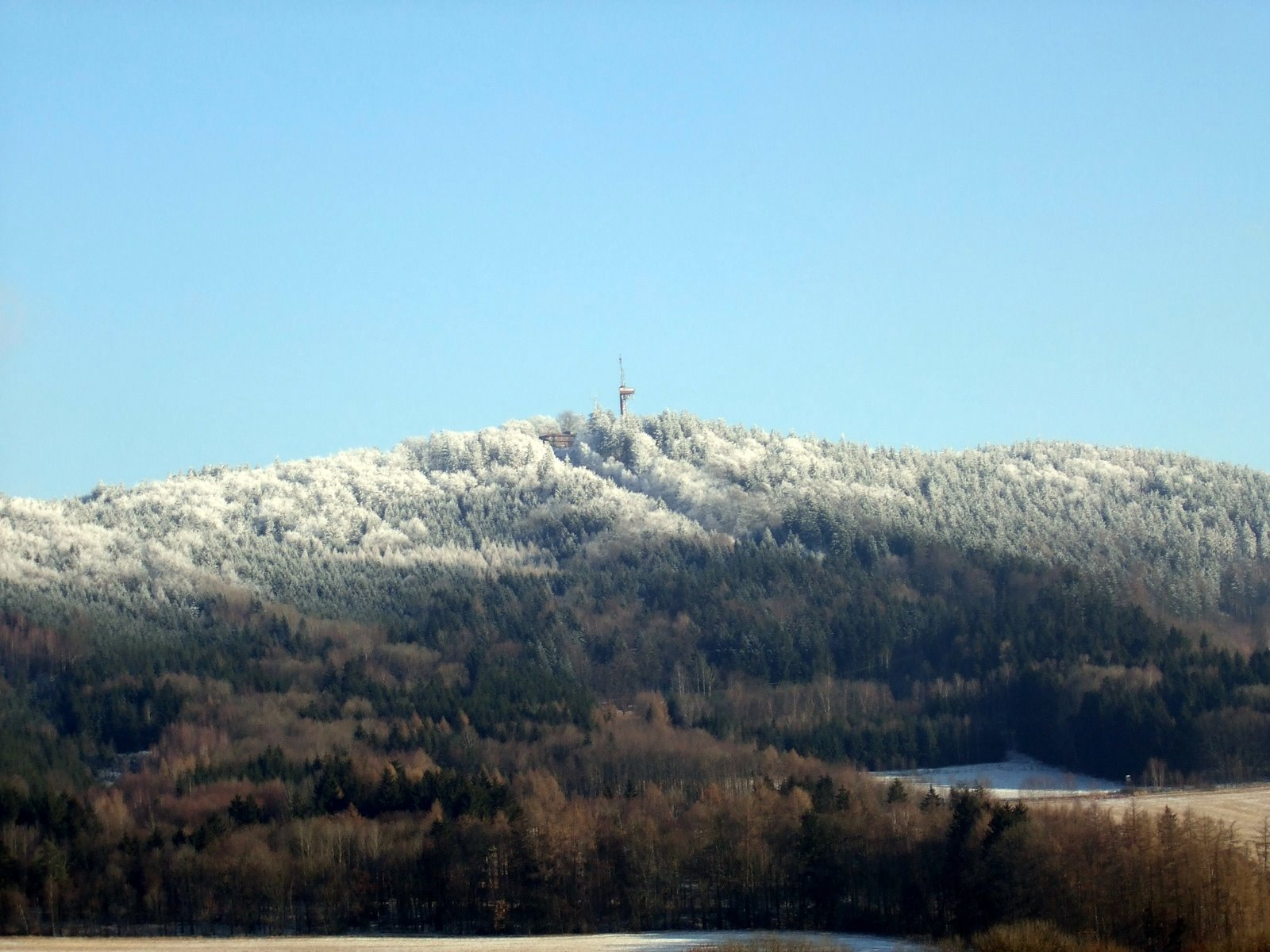
Koráb hill with the observation tower
