= Cham-Furth Depression =

Lowland in Central Europe

Coordinates: 49°16′00″N 12°46′00″E

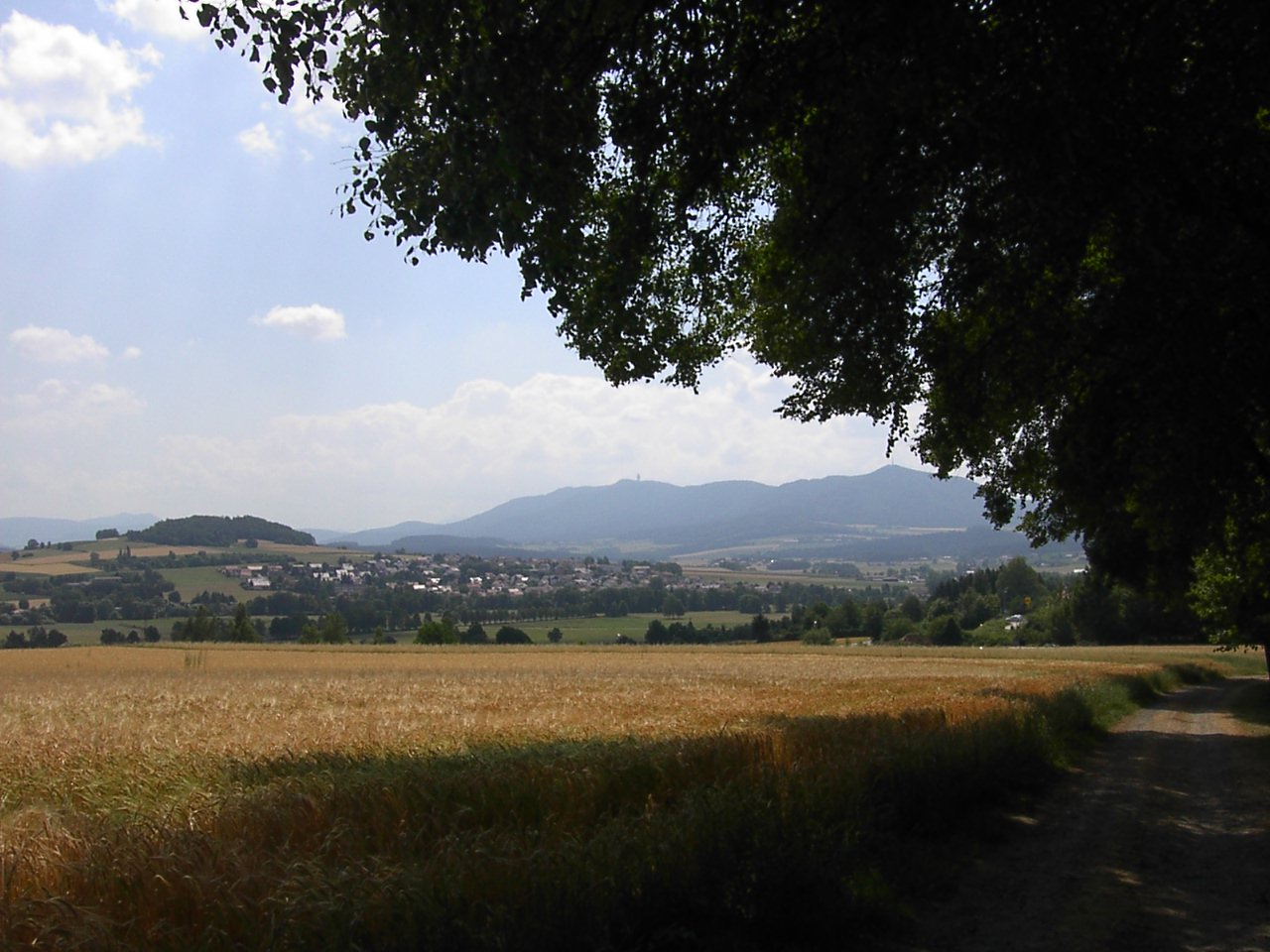
The Cham-Further valley near Furth im Wald

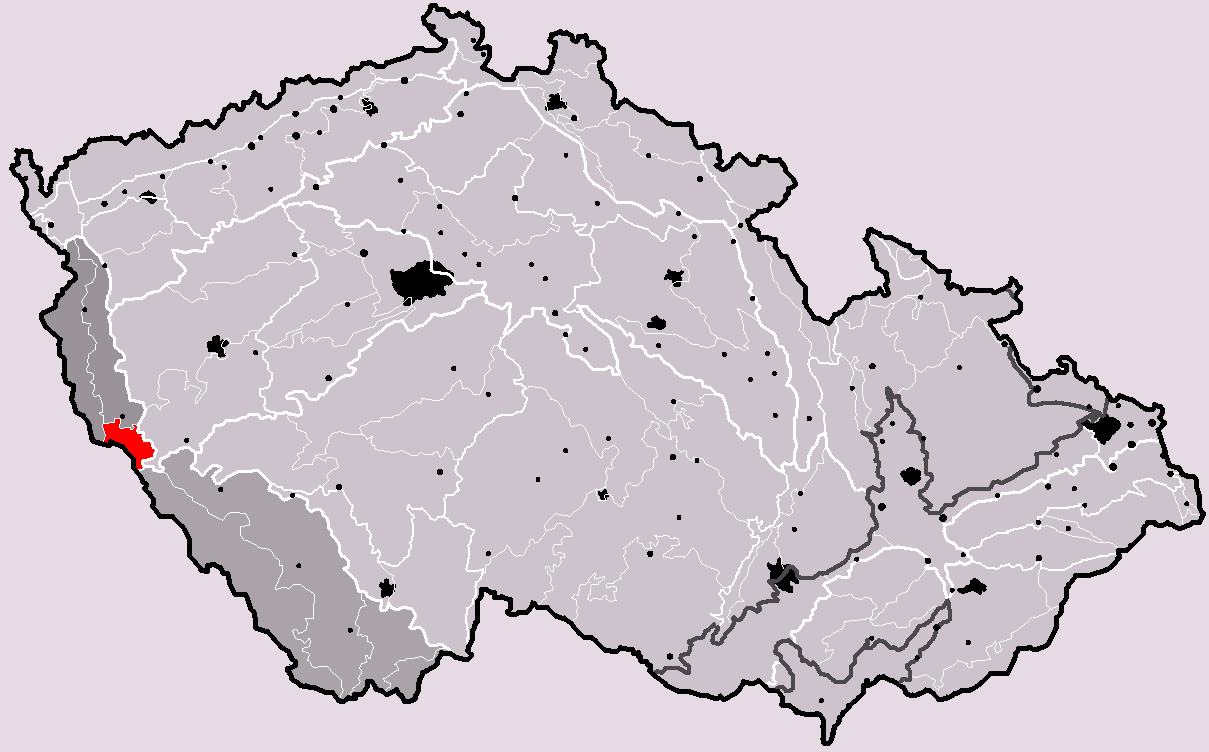
Cham-Furth Depression in the geomorphological system of the Czech Republic

The Cham-Furth Depression or Všeruby Highlands (German: Cham-Further Senke, Czech: Všerubská vrchovina) is a lowland in the Upper Palatine-Bavarian Forest that separates the Upper Palatinate Forest from the Bavarian Forest. At the same time it connects the Upper Palatinate with Bohemia.

The German part has an area of 281 km^{2}, a length of 40 kilometres and a width of five to ten kilometres. The Czech part covers 206 km^{2}. The valley runs in a west-southwest-east northeast direction.

It is divided into the Cham basin in the west at a height of 360 to 400 metres, which extends from Roding roughly as far as Arnschwang, and the smaller Furth depression in the east, which extends to Bohemia at heights of 400 to 500 metres. The Furth valley is bounded in the east by the European watershed. Its highest point is Kameňák (Steinwald, 751 m) near Svatá Kateřina (St. Katharina).

The geologically ancient depression is filled with Pleistocene and alluvial sediments and drained by the rivers Chamb and Regen and their tributaries. These rivers meander through the undulating, hilly region.

In the Cham Basin, gneisses and granites predominate. In the Furth valley melanocratic rock of the gabbro-amphibolite mass is dominant. The climate is warmer and drier than the surrounding mountains, but winters are relatively cold and often characterized by böhm winds from the east.

The hilltops of the typically rural landscape are covered with islands of spruce and pine. While the Cham Basin has been inhabited almost continuously since the Stone Age, the Furth valley was not fully developed until the High Middle Ages. Farming dominates, followed by grassland use.

The Cham-Furth Depression has always been an important communication route between Bavaria and Bohemia. Cham Castle, built around 976, guarded the eastern border of the Empire. The Bavarian-Bohemian border of the vast area has remained highly disputed throughout the early modern period, which led to different negotiations and agreements between the kings of Bohemia and the dukes of Bavaria in 1564, 1580, and finally in 1764. Today the area is part of the Upper Bavarian Forest Nature Park.

== Literature ==
- Volker Voggenreiter (1971). ″Geobotanische Untersuchungen in der Cham-Further Senke und ihren montanen Randhöhen″. In Hoppea. Denkschriften der Regensburgischen Botanischen Gesellschaft, XXVIII. Vol. New series XXII, part II. Regensburg.
- Taku Minagawa (2015). ″Border Conflicts between Bohemia and Bavaria and Their Solutions. Comparative Considerations.″ In Marco Bellabarba, Hannes Obermair, Hitomi Sato (eds.). Communities and Conflicts in the Alps from the Late Middle Ages to Early Modernity. (Fondazione Bruno Kessler. Contributi/Beiträge. 30). Bologna-Berlin: Il mulino—Duncker & Humblot. ISBN 978-88-15-25383-5, pp. 73–90.
