= Chodská Lhota =

- Municipality
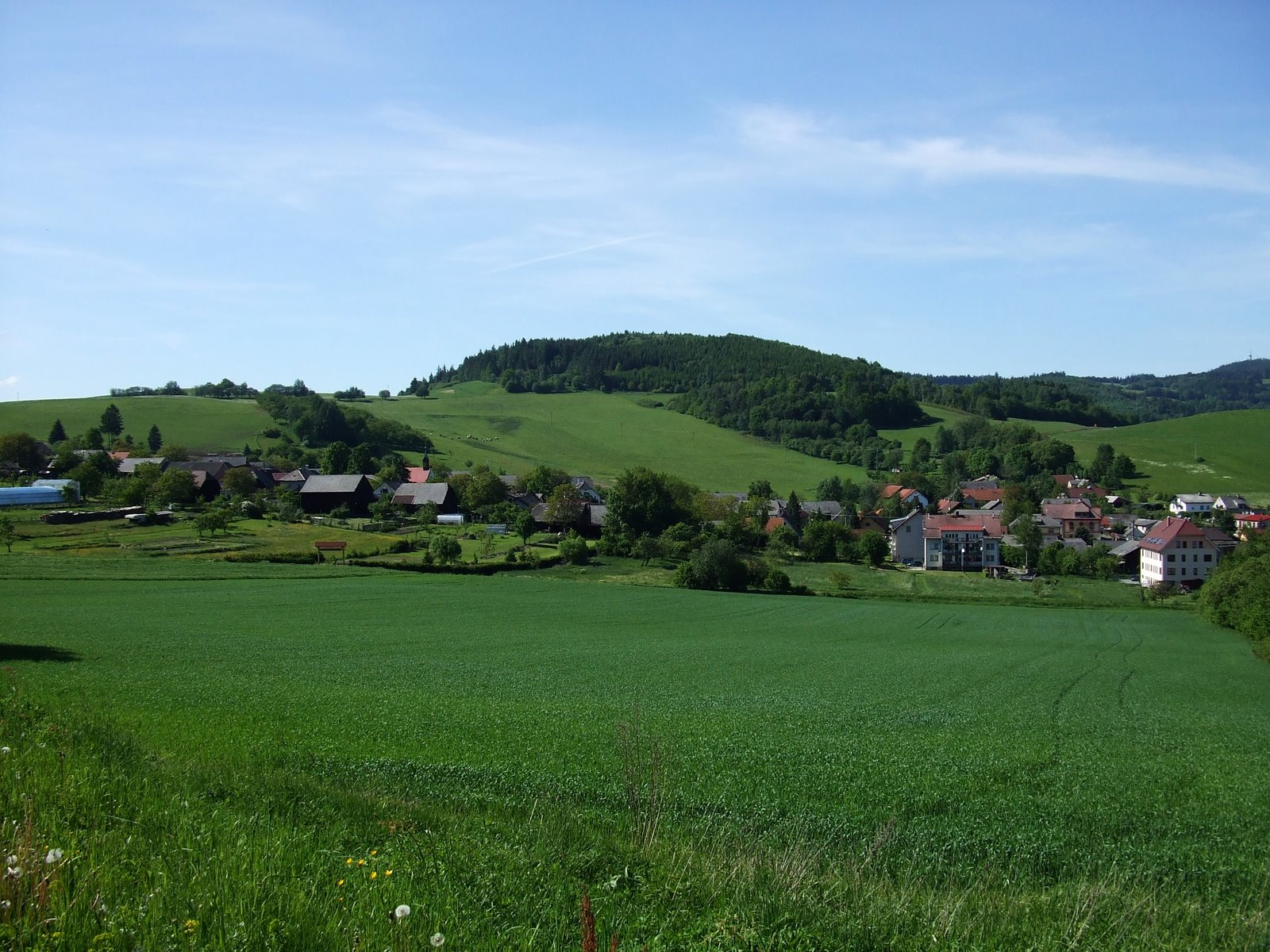
- View from the southeast

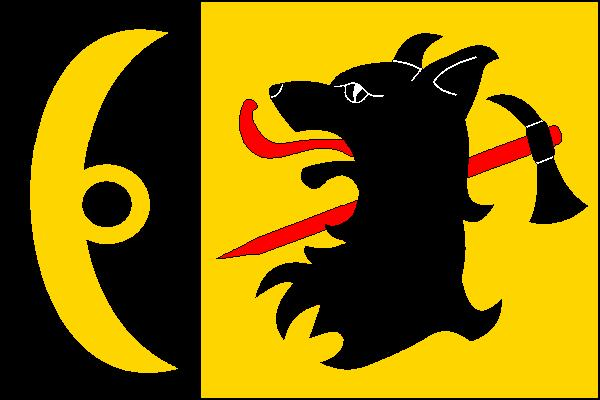
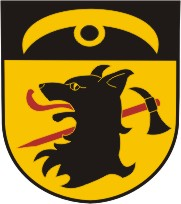
- Flag Coat of arms

- Location in the Czech Republic
- Coordinates: 49°21′30″N 13°5′0″E
- Country: Czech Republic
- Region: Plzeň
- District: Domažlice
- First mentioned: 1325

Area
  - Total: 10.28 km^{2} (3.97 sq mi)
- Elevation: 500 m (1,600 ft)

Population (2026-01-01)
  - Total: 394
  - Density: 38.3/km^{2} (99.3/sq mi)
- Time zone: UTC+1 (CET)
  - Summer (DST): UTC+2 (CEST)
- Postal code: 345 10
- Website: www.chodskalhota.cz

Chodská Lhota (until 1946 Lhota u Kdyně; German: Melhut) is a municipality and village in Domažlice District in the Plzeň Region of the Czech Republic. It has about 400 inhabitants.

Chodská Lhota lies approximately 16 kilometres (10 mi) south-east of Domažlice, 50 km (31 mi) south-west of Plzeň, and 127 km (79 mi) south-west of Prague.

== Demographics ==
Historical population
Year	Pop.	±%
1869	940	—
1880	884	−6.0%
1890	822	−7.0%
1900	799	−2.8%
1910	827	+3.5%
1921	811	−1.9%
1930	735	−9.4%
1950	552	−24.9%
1961	526	−4.7%
1970	441	−16.2%
1980	426	−3.4%
1991	399	−6.3%
2001	375	−6.0%
2011	418	+11.5%
2021	399	−4.5%
Source: Censuses
