= Further Drachenstich =

Coordinates: 49.3083°N 12.8442°E

Further Drachenstich (the slaying of the dragon) is a traditional folk custom in Furth im Wald, in the Upper Palatinate District of Bavaria, Germany. It is the oldest local theater play in Germany, dating back to 1590 and it is generally referred to as a parade at the end of which the knight would pierce the dragon with his spear and eventually kill him. Drachenstich is a common term in many regions in southern Germany and Austria due to regional dragon legends. The spectacle was included in the Federal Register of Intangible Cultural Heritage in 2018.

== History ==
The Furth im Wald Drachenstich was originally part of the Corpus Christi procession. The first written records of the procession mentioning a citizen in armor taking part in the event date back to 1590. It is assumed that Saint George's fight against a dragon, metaphorized as the "struggle of good against evil", served as the model for this tradition.

Over the years, the Drachenstich performance attracted more and more people, at the expense of the Corpus Christi procession. This led to much criticism from the Church and the authorities and in 1887, the Drachenstich was finally set on a different date from the procession. The new festival date was set to August. On this occasion, a grand historical procession was staged and a play depicting the eternal struggle between good and evil was performed.

From the 1890s onwards, there were plans to replace the short scene between the knight and his beloved, dating from the Baroque period, with a more elaborate theater play. But it wasn't until 1922 that Bayreuth composer Heinrich Schmidt's play was presented to the public for the first time. Despite a number of attempts to modernize the text by Heinz Schauwecker (1923) and Eugen Hubrich (1932), Schmidt's version remained the standard over the following decades.

In 1951, Josef Martin Bauer wrote a new version of the show, more focused on the killing of the dragon. The action takes place in 1431 against the historical backdrop of the Hussite wars. In this version, whose dramaturgy was again revised by Sigfrid Färber in 1953, the dragon becomes a symbol of the horrors of the wars in the border area around Furth. The hero and dragon-slayer is the standard-bearer Udo, who saves his chatelaine Maria ("die Ritterin" (English: the Dame)).

In 2006, a new version, written by director Alexander Etzel-Ragusa, premiered alongside the old play by Josef Martin Bauer. Since 2007, only the new version has been performed. The new play pays homage to the political changes in Germany (collapse of the Eastern bloc) and gives more space to the characters, particularly to the history and ages of the Hussite wars.

== Performance ==
The spectacle is presented each year in Furth in several performances during the Festival Week, which traditionally begins in August. With over a thousand participants in traditional costumes and more than 250 horses, the procession is a major event that chronicles the town's history from its first mention in an official document in 1086 to the 18th century. In addition to the spectacle and the procession, other events have been added to the Festival Week over the years: a folk festival, the "Cave Gladium", with its medieval market and tournaments, and a children's festival offering an adaptation of the Drachenstich specially designed by and for children. The story of the Drachenstich and the dragon can be found at the 1st German Dragon Museum and in the Dragon Cave.

In 2000, the Drachenstich actors gave a special performance of the play at the Bavarian State Festival in Regensburg. This festival was the highlight of official Bavarian events for the new millennium, with participants from all over the state of Bavaria.

=== Photo gallery ===
Scenes from the Further Drachenstich

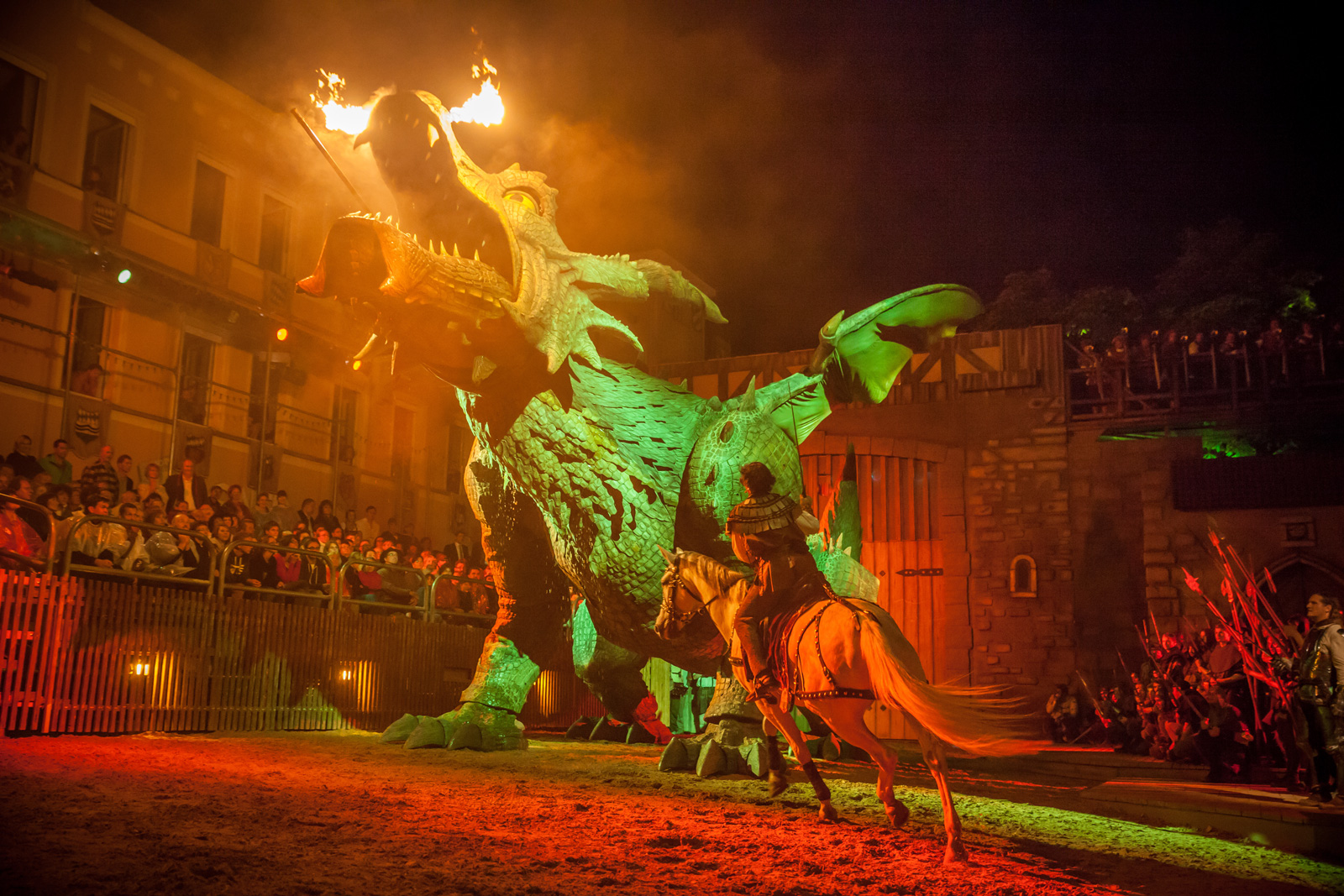
Dragon fight

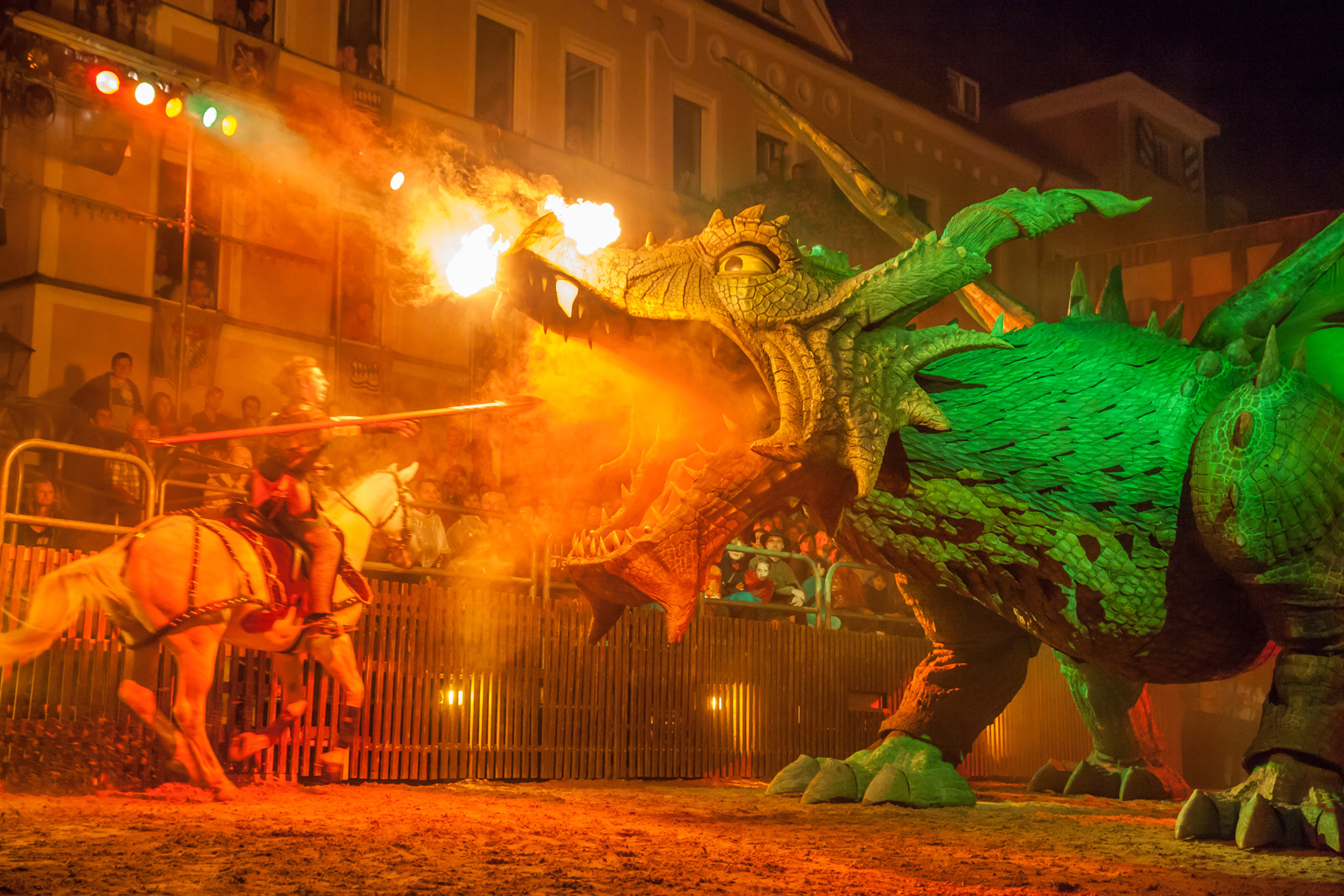
The Drachenstich (The Slaying of the Dragon)

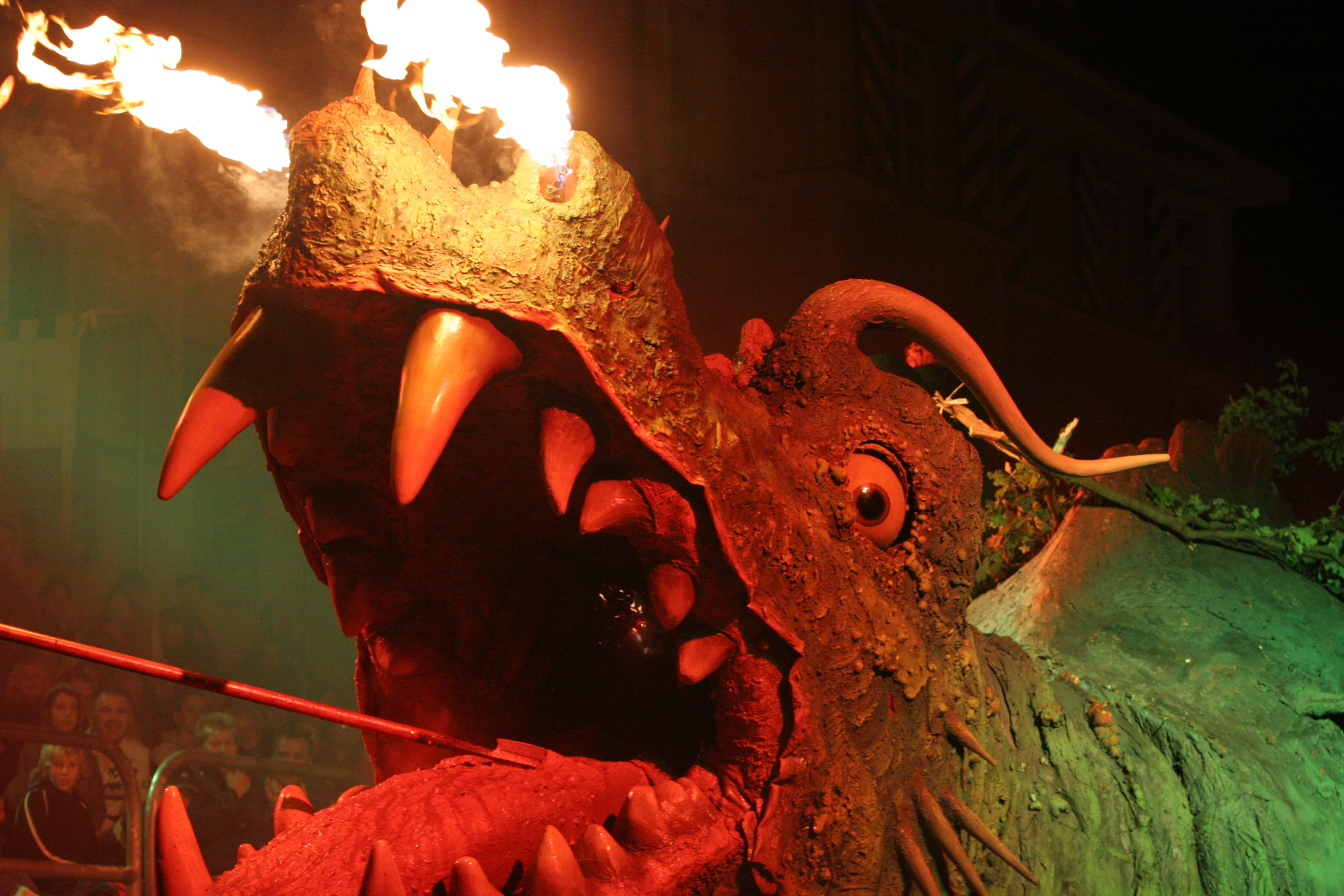
Stabbed Dragon

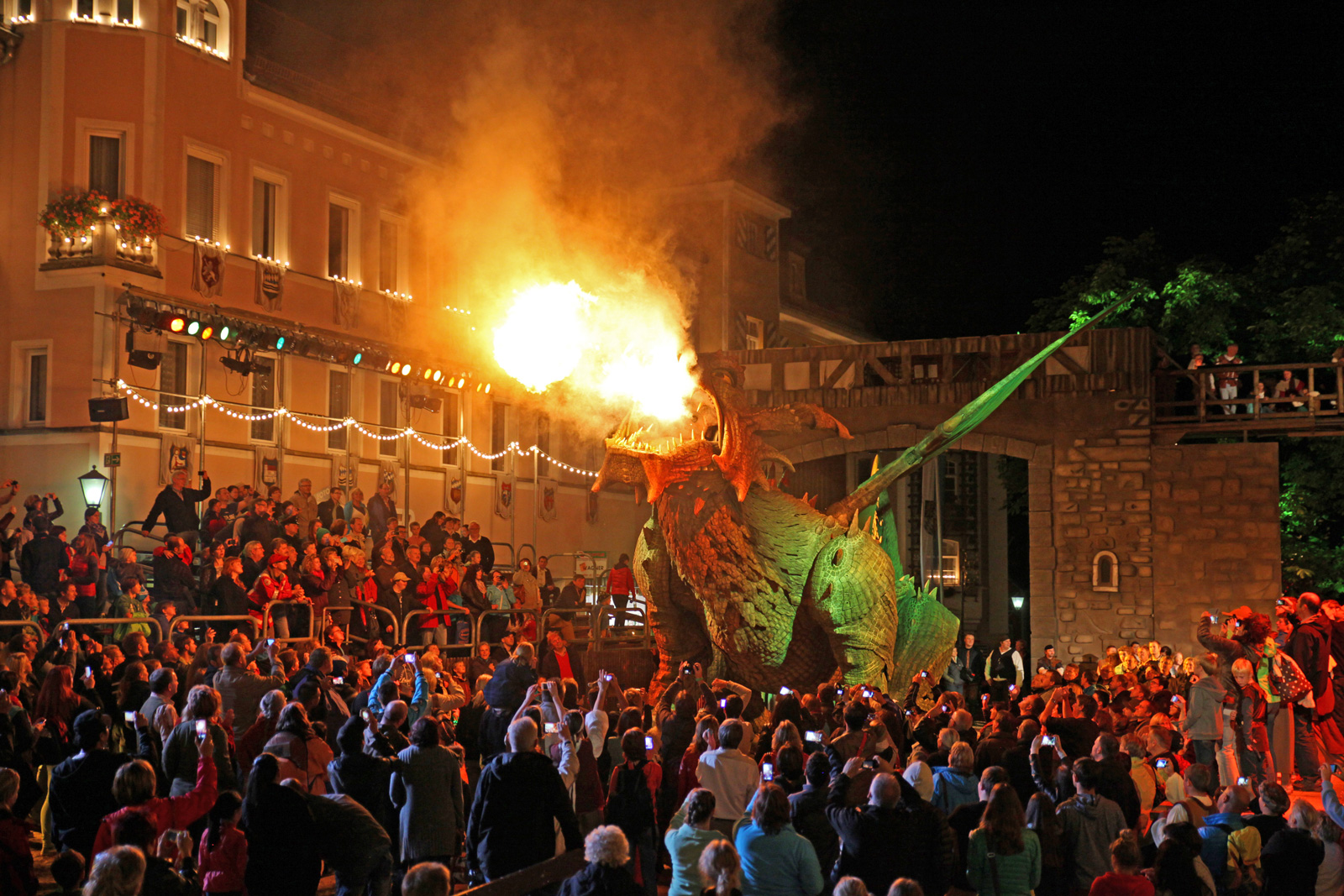
Enthusiastic visitors

== A New Dragon ==
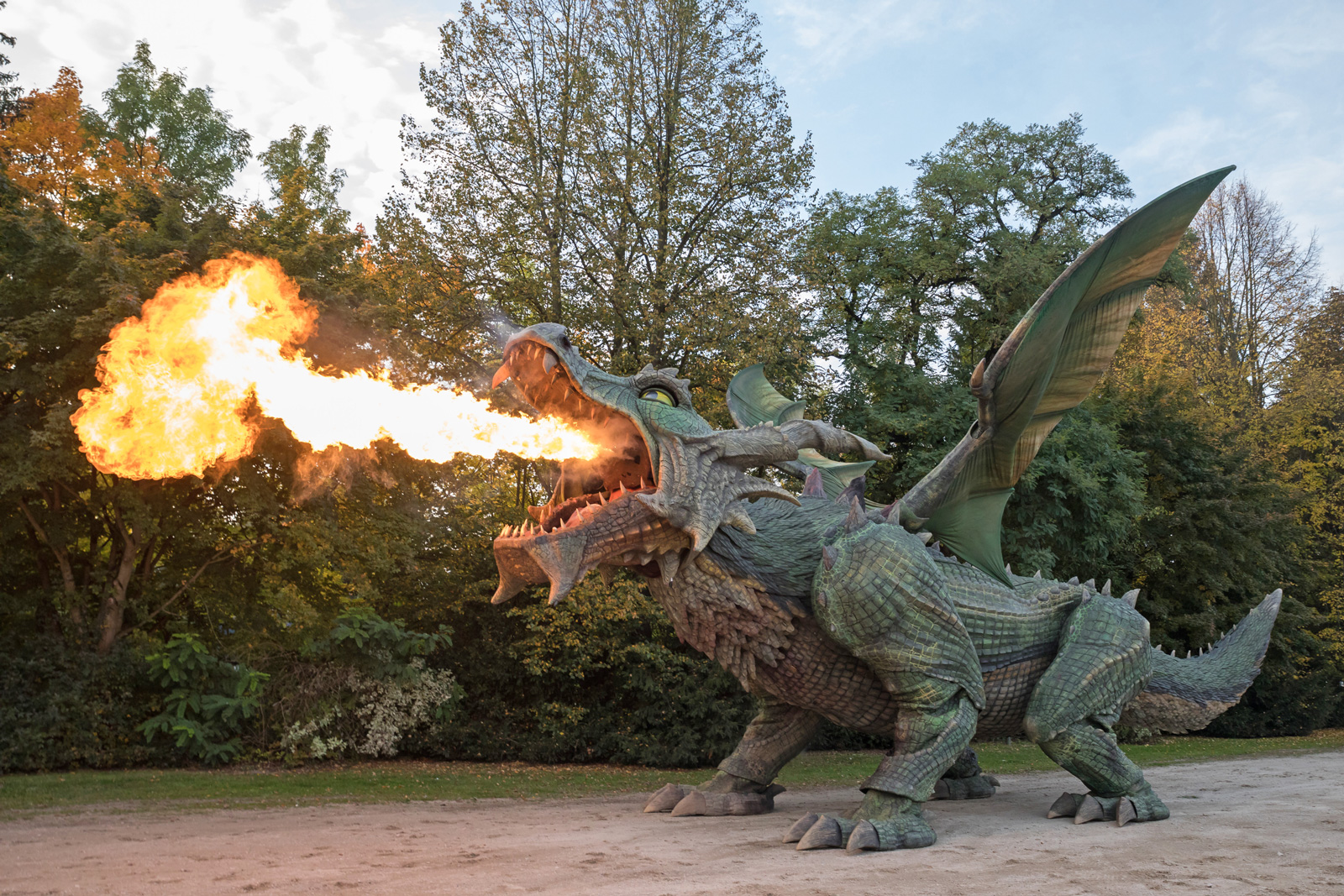
The Further Dragon

Although plans for a new dragon have existed since 2001, it wasn't until July 15, 2006, that funding for a new dragon was announced and secured. In February 2007, the main project for its realization was launched and the construction was supervised by Zollner Elektronik in Zandt. The project cost 2.3 million euros and it took almost nine years to build this walking robot measuring 15.5 meters long, 3.8 meters wide, 4.5 meters high and weighing 11 tons. The dragon is capable of running at up to 12 km/h, but local guidelines limit its speed to 1.8 km/h. It can also lift and turn its head, has facial expressions, a movable tail, can spread its wings to a 12-meter wingspan, spit fire and smoke over 5 meters and roar. It is controlled by 4 people, each of whom can control a leg and an option such as fire. Due to local regulations and for added security, each person can see what the other is doing. On June 2, 2010, some 10,000 people gathered to watch the dragon arrive by truck in Furth im Wald. It has been used for the first time at the festival on July 31, 2010. The dragon is currently the largest four-legged robot in the world, and was entered in the Guinness Book of Records in 2012. The title of Further's dragon-building project was Tradinno (TRADition + INNOvation), hence its name: Tradinno.

== Other ==
As part of its "Customs and Traditions" series, the German postal services issued a special Further Drachenstich postage stamp worth 1 Deutsche Mark on August 9, 2001.

== Literature ==
- Alexander Schöppner: Der Drachenstich zu Furth im Wald In der Oberpfalz (1852) In: Projekt Gutenberg-DE.
- Erich Dimpfl: Der Drachenstich zu Furth i. Wald. Chronik des ältesten deutschen Volksschauspiels. Furth im Wald 1970, 2. Auflage 1985
- Eva Frischmuth: Der Further Drachenstich. Die Darstellung von „Gut“ und „Böse“ im ältesten Volksschauspiel Deutschlands. GRIN, München 2019, ISBN 978-3-668-99638-0
- Werner Perlinger: Der Drachenstich in Furth im Wald. In: Bärbel Kleindorfer-Marx (Hrsg.): Oberpfalz und Böhmen. Begegnungen über Grenzen. Festschrift zum 32. Bayerischen Nordgautag in Furth im Wald. Oberpfälzer Kulturbund, Regensburg 1998, S. 179–184 (PDF)
- Ingeborg Perlinger, Werner Perlinger: Seit Jahrhunderten Drachenkampf in Furth. Historischer Verein, Furth im Wald 2007, ISBN 978-3-9806051-4-4

== Notes and references ==
Drachenstich is a German festival held in furth im wald, there is a dragon slaying play.
