= Hoštice =

Hoštice or Hostice may refer to places:

== Czech Republic ==
- Hoštice (Kroměříž District), a municipality and village in the Zlín Region
- Hoštice (Strakonice District), a municipality and village in the South Bohemian Region
- Hoštice, a village and part of Hoštice-Heroltice in the South Moravian Region
- Hoštice, a village and part of Mochtín in the Plzeň Region
- Hoštice, a village and part of Nemyšl in the South Bohemian Region
- Hostice (Ruda nad Moravou), a village and part of Ruda nad Moravou in the Olomouc Region
- Hoštice, a village and part of Vodochody in the Central Bohemian Region
- Střelské Hoštice, a municipality and village in the South Bohemian Region
- Šumavské Hoštice, a municipality and village in the South Bohemian Region
- Velké Hoštice, a municipality and village in the Moravian-Silesian Region

== Slovakia ==
- Hostice, Rimavská Sobota District, a municipality and village in the Banská Bystrica Region
