= Radomilov =

Village in the Czech Republic

Coordinates: 49°58′N 16°54′E

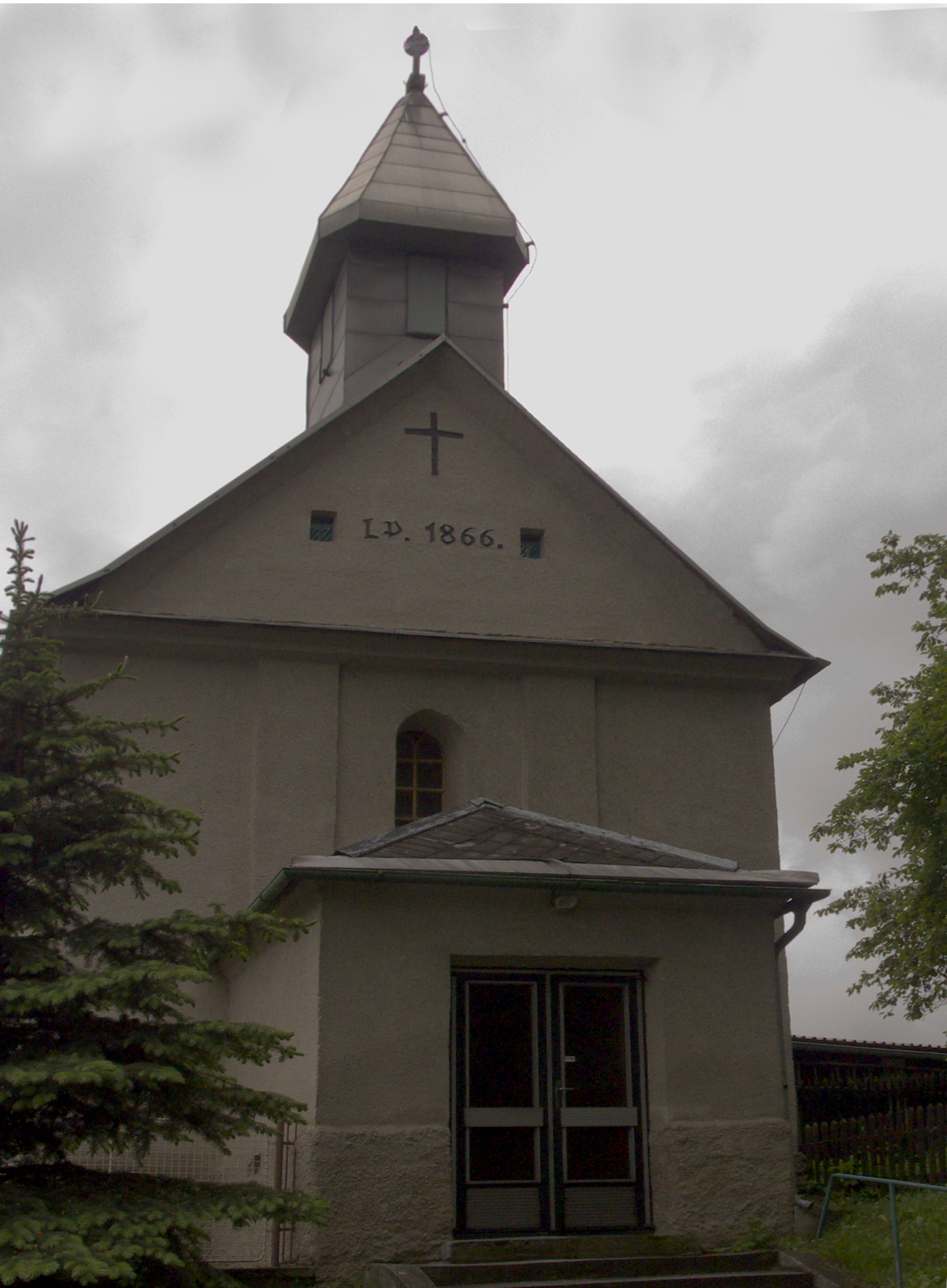
Chapel of Saint Anne

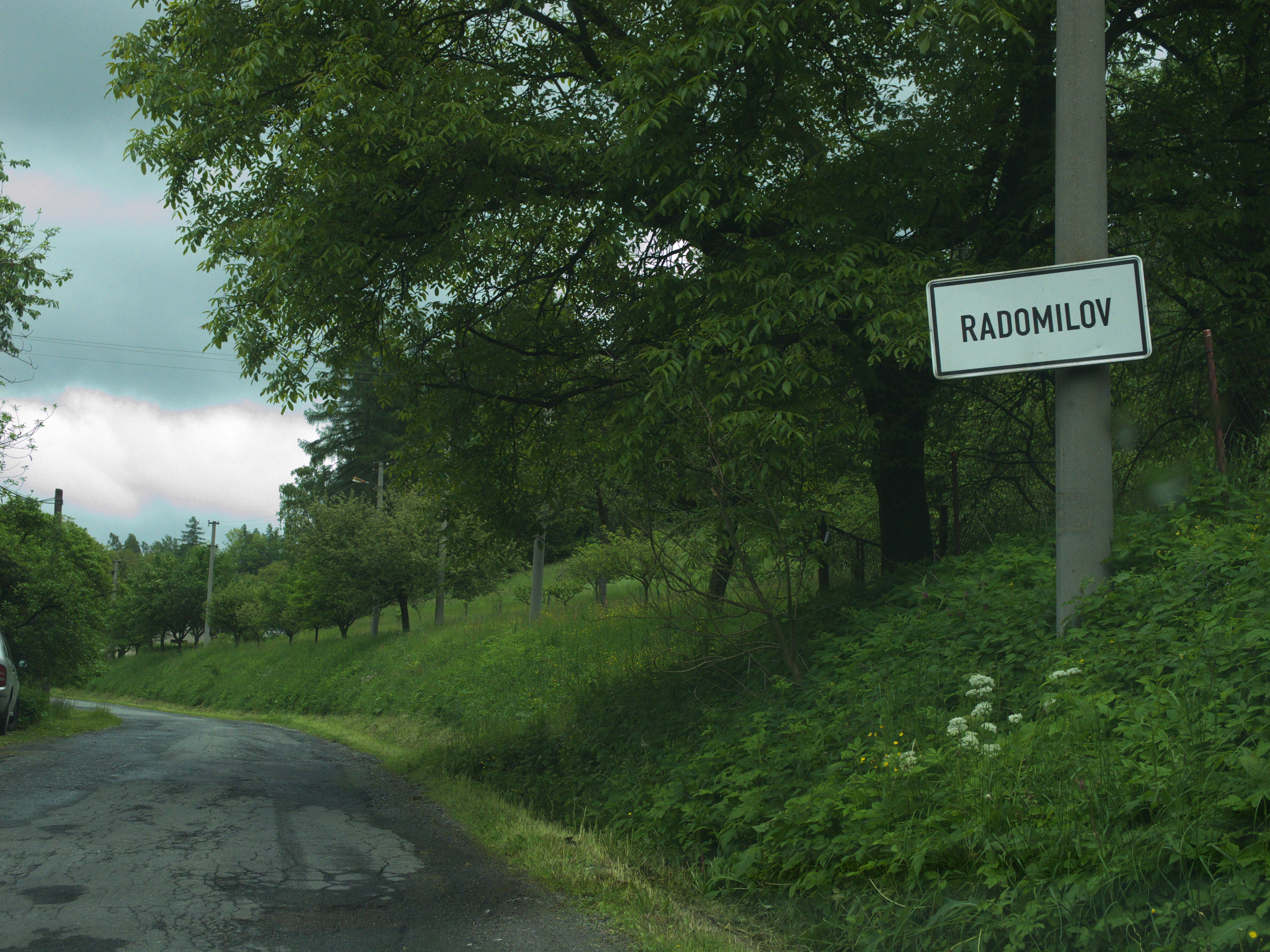
Entrance to Radomilov

Radomilov is a village and municipal part of Ruda nad Moravou in Šumperk District in the Olomouc Region of the Czech Republic. The oldest note about the village comes from 1371. The Radomilov manor was held by the Zierotin family to 1561, by the Fylčan of Hrabová family to 1583, by the Odkolek of Oujezdec family to 1622, and by the Liechtenstein family to the fall of feudal system in 1848. In 1871, a primary school was opened, operating until 1976. Radomilov was a Czech village with only one Sudeten German inhabitant in 1930. The population was 101 people in 2011. The area is not served by public transport.
