= Ruda nad Moravou =

- Municipality
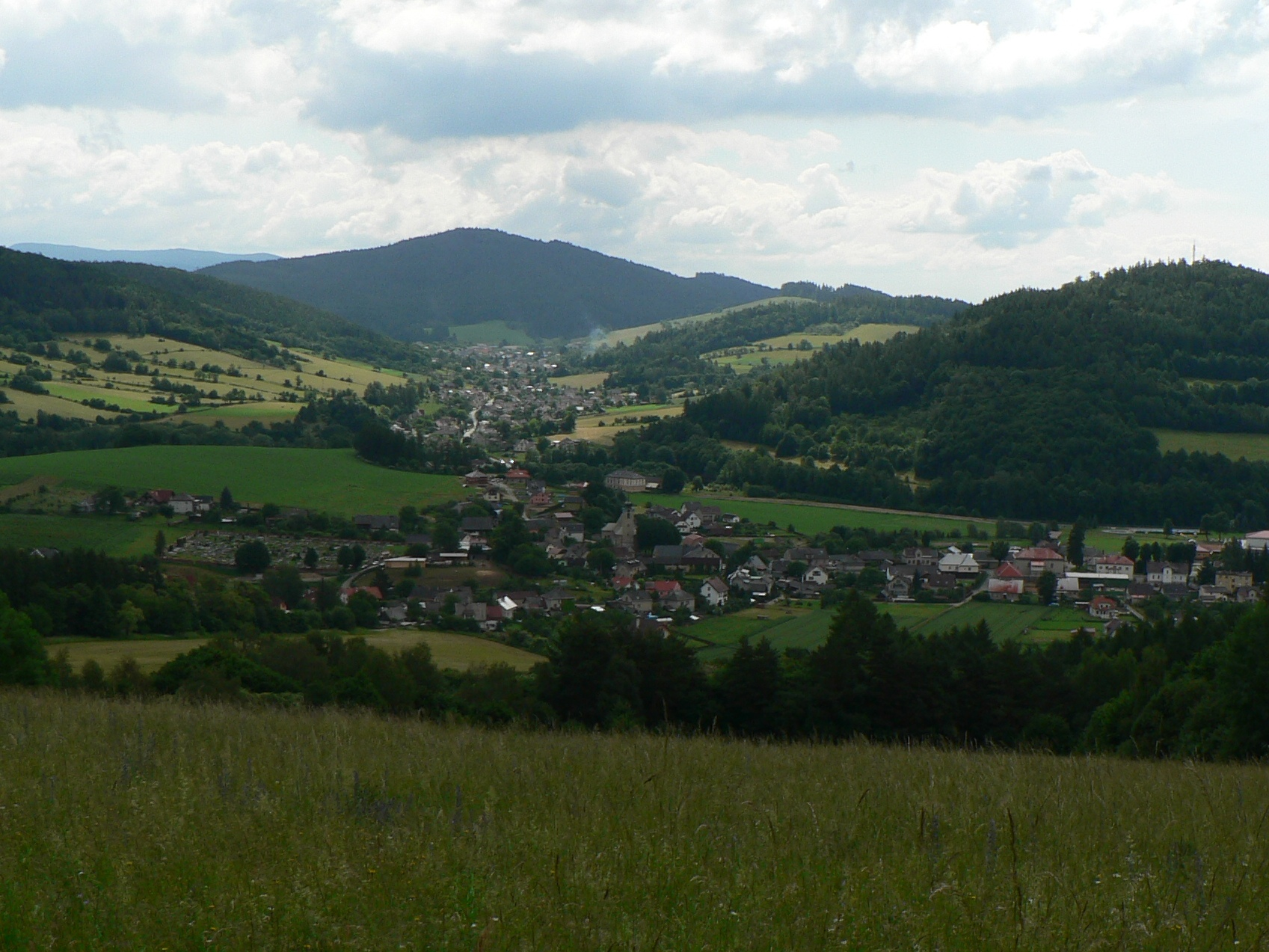
- View of Ruda nad Moravou

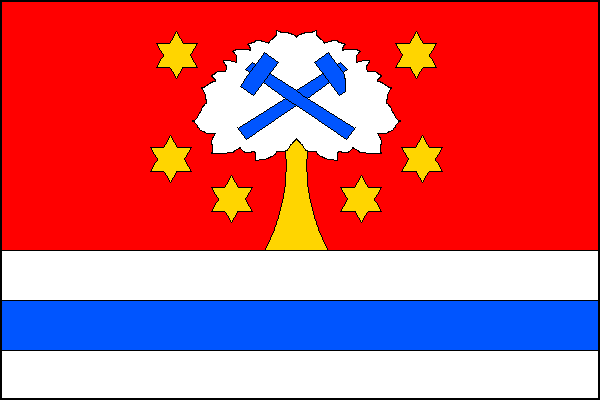
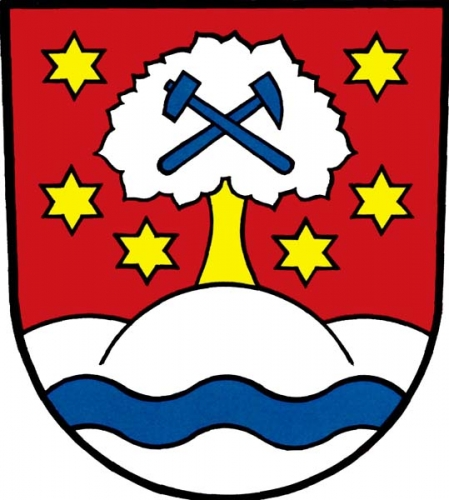
- Flag Coat of arms

- Location in the Czech Republic
- Coordinates: 49°58′52″N 16°52′40″E
- Country: Czech Republic
- Region: Olomouc
- District: Šumperk
- First mentioned: 1350

Area
  - Total: 24.98 km^{2} (9.64 sq mi)
- Elevation: 325 m (1,066 ft)

Population (2026-01-01)
  - Total: 2,498
  - Density: 100.0/km^{2} (259.0/sq mi)
- Time zone: UTC+1 (CET)
  - Summer (DST): UTC+2 (CEST)
- Postal code: 789 63
- Website: www.ruda.cz

Ruda nad Moravou (German: Eisenberg) is a municipality and village in Šumperk District in the Olomouc Region of the Czech Republic. It has about 2,500 inhabitants.

== Administrative division ==
Ruda nad Moravou consists of six municipal parts (in brackets population according to the 2021 census):

- Ruda nad Moravou (1,025)
- Bartoňov (114)
- Hostice (415)
- Hrabenov (671)
- Radomilov (96)
- Štědrákova Lhota (78)

== Etymology ==
The word ruda means 'ore' in Czech. The origin of the name is connected with iron ore mining. The name appeared first in Latin as Ferreus Mons and in German as Eisenberg, both meaning 'iron mountain'. From 1880, the municipality is named Ruda nad Moravou ('Ruda upon the Morava (river)') to distinguish from other places with the same name.

== Geography ==
Ruda nad Moravou is located about 7 kilometres (4 mi) west of Šumperk and 50 km (31 mi) northwest of Olomouc. The Morava River flows through the municipality. The built-up area around the Morava is located mainly in the Mohelnice Depression. Rest of the territory is located in the Hanušovice Highlands. The highest point is the hill Háj at 631 m (2,070 ft) above sea level.

== History ==
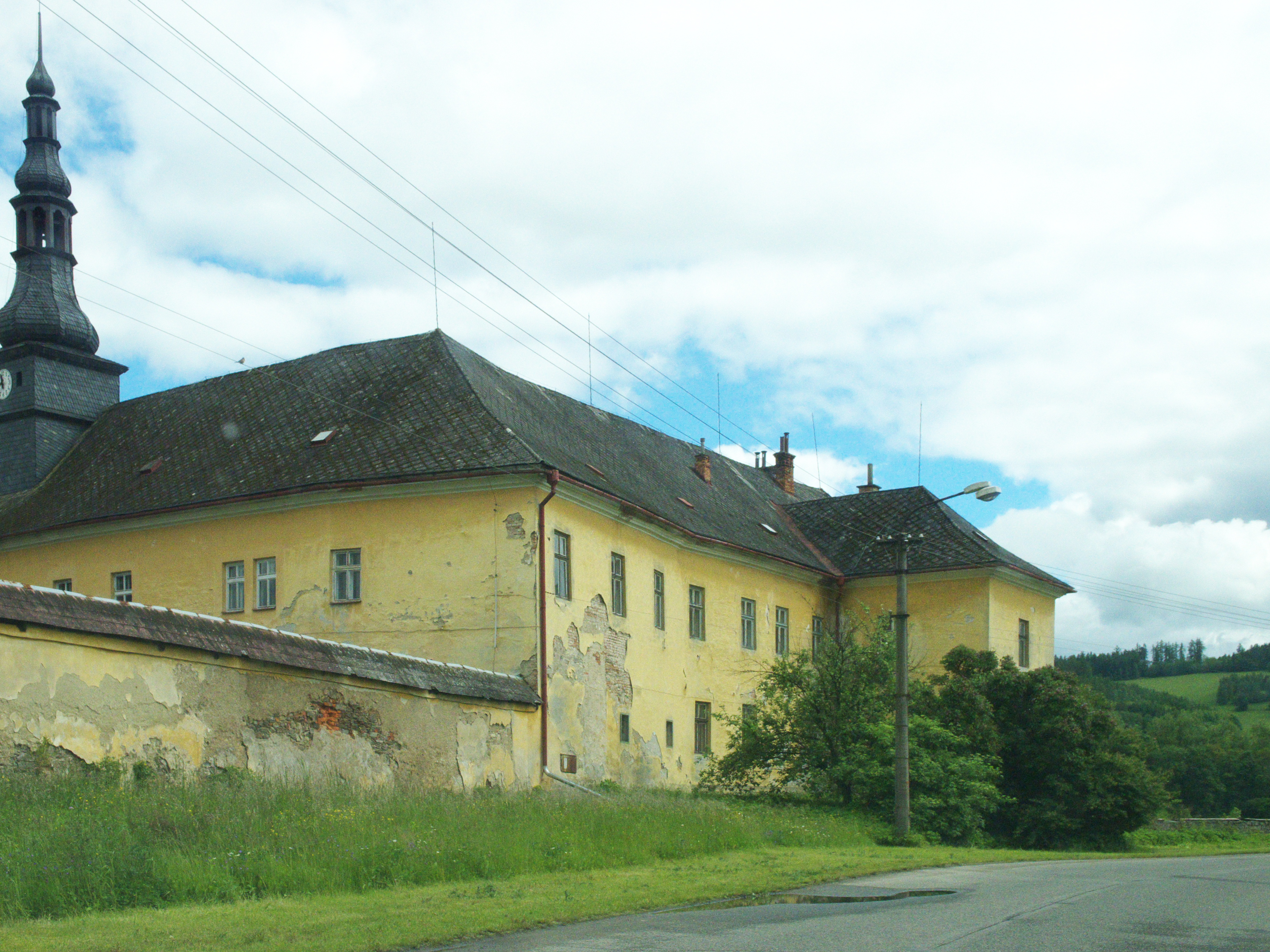
Ruda nad Moravou Castle before the reconstruction

The first written mention of Ruda nad Moravou is from 1350. A church and parish were already there and the iron ore was mined. Until 1397, it was probably a part of the Zábřeh estate owned by the Sternberg family. From 1397 to 1447, it was owned by lords of Kravaře, who laid the foundation of an independent estate. Ruda was owned by the Tunkl of Brníčko family in 1447–1508, by Mikuláš Trčka of Lípa in 1508–1512, and by the Lords of Boskovice in 1512–1596.

In 1596, Ruda was separated from the Zábřeh estate and sold to the Zierotin family. Lord Bernard of Zierotin had built a Renaissance castle here in 1610. After the Battle of White Mountain, the properties of the Zierotins were confiscated and Ruda was acquired by the Liechtenstein family. The village was then heavily stroke by events of Thirty Years' War. The Liechtensteins owned it until 1848.

In 1896, the municipality was divided to two parts, the Czech Horní Ruda ('upper Ruda') and the Sudeten German Dolní Ruda ('lower Ruda'). This two municipalities were united again in 1920. The German-speaking population was expelled after World War II.

In 1960, the village of Hostice was joined to Ruda nad Moravou. In 1980, Hrabenov was joined.

== Demographics ==
Historical population

Year	Pop.	±%
1869	4,122	—
1880	4,074	−1.2%
1890	4,409	+8.2%
1900	4,465	+1.3%
1910	4,485	+0.4%

Year	Pop.	±%
1921	4,313	−3.8%
1930	4,258	−1.3%
1950	2,891	−32.1%
1961	3,040	+5.2%
1970	2,858	−6.0%

Year	Pop.	±%
1980	2,671	−6.5%
1991	2,410	−9.8%
2001	2,474	+2.7%
2011	2,515	+1.7%
2021	2,399	−4.6%

Source: Censuses

== Transport ==
Ruda nad Moravou is located on the railway lines Hanušovice–Šumperk and Jeseník–Zábřeh. The municipality is served by two railway stops: Ruda nad Moravou and Bartoňov.

== Sights ==
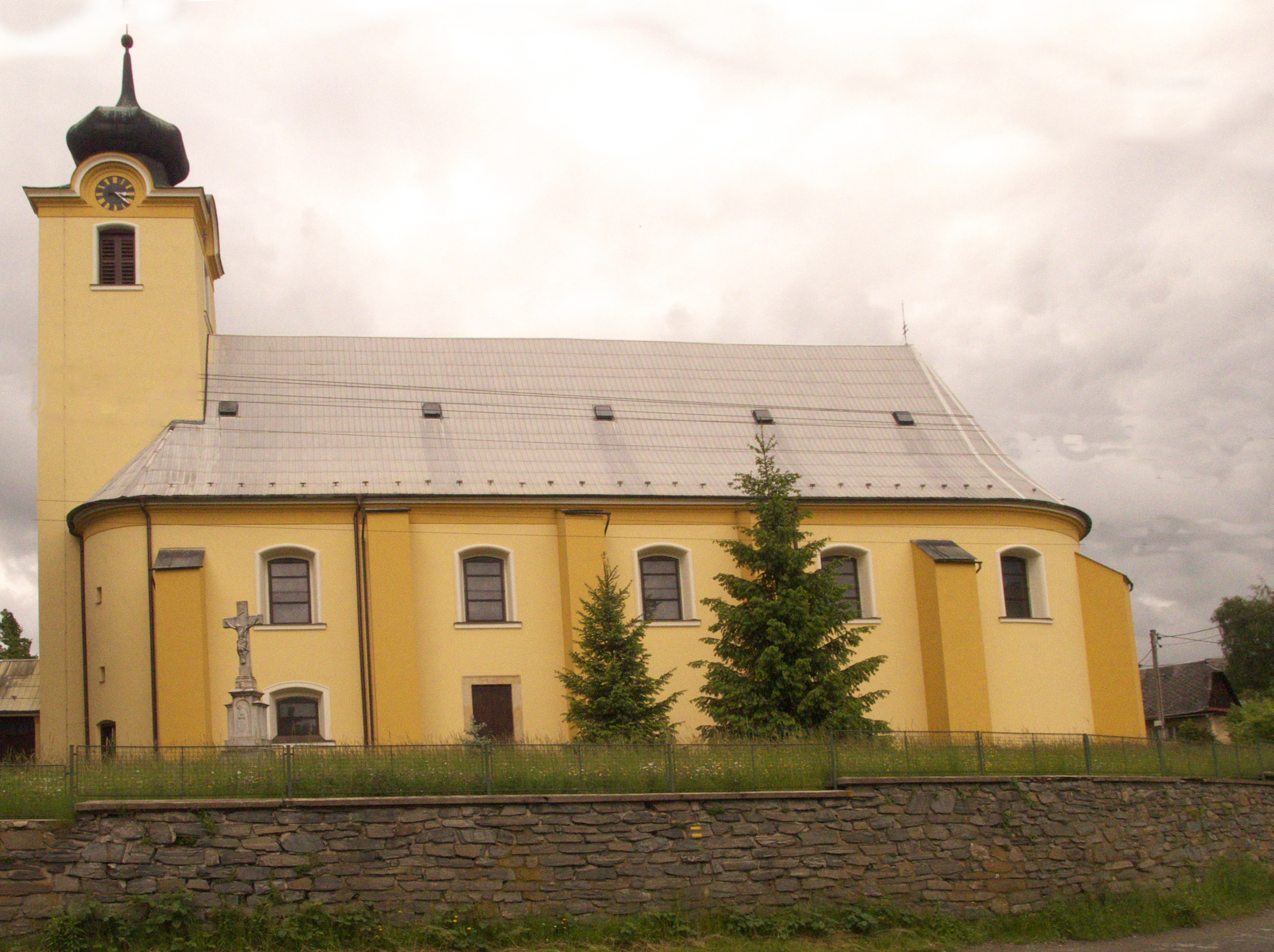
Church of Saint Lawrence

The most valuable monument of Ruda nad Moravou is the local Renaissance castle. Today it is privately owned and gradually reconstructed.

The Church of Saint Lawrence is the landmark of the village. The current structure was built in 1784–1806.

An architecturally valuable Empire building of a distillery from the first half of the 19th century has been preserved. There is also an Empire house from 1818.

On the hill Háj is the Háj observation tower.

== Notable people ==
- Pavel Štefka (born 1954), army general

== Twin towns – sister cities ==
Ruda nad Moravou is twinned with:

- Kanianka, Slovakia
