= Štědrákova Lhota =

Coordinates: 50.0228°N 16.8700°E

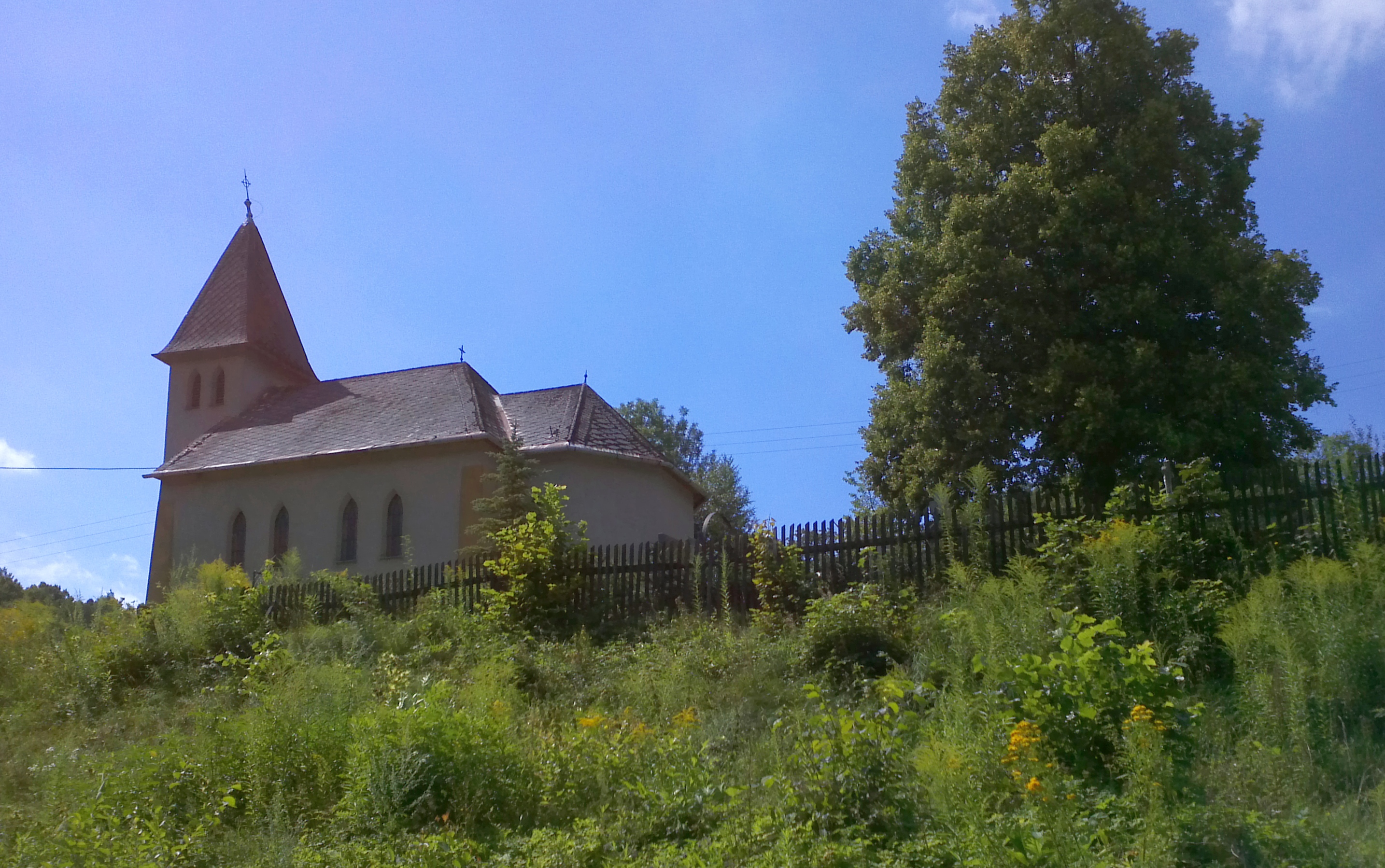
The Church of Pope Fabian

Štědrákova Lhota (German: Tschödrich) is the village in Šumperk District in Olomouc Region of Czech Republic. It is named after Šťědrák, the administrator of Ruda nad Moravou manor who provided to new settlers timber for building and the tax exemption for a certain period (lhota in Czech). First note about the village comes from 1397. Štědrákova Lhota occupies 493 hectares along Pstruhovec creek in the steep hillside, the upper end is 700 meters above sea level. The Panorama ski resort in situated in the area. The place is served by one bus line. Number of inhabitants was 69 people in 2001. Area surrounding the village was a rich source of inspiration for painter Karel Homola. Historically, the village was wholly inhabited by Czechs, thus population number was not stroke by expulsion of Germans.
