= Bartoňov =

- Village
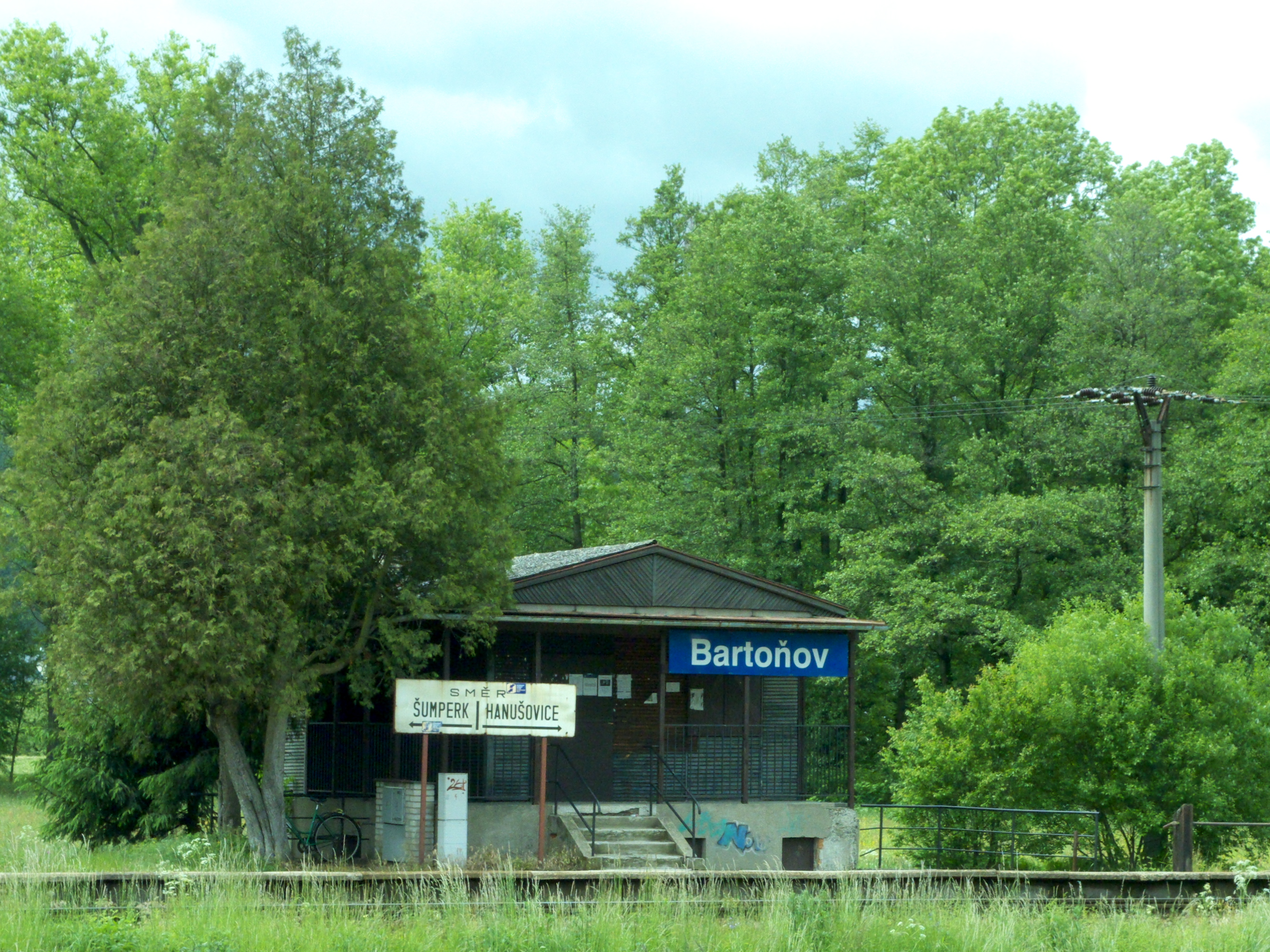
- Bartoňov train stop

- Location in the Czech Republic
- Coordinates: 49°58′01″N 16°52′39″E
- Country: Czech Republic
- Region: Olomouc
- District: Šumperk
- Municipality: Ruda nad Moravou
- First mentioned: 1411

Area
  - Total: 2.12 km^{2} (0.82 sq mi)

Population (2021)
  - Total: 114
  - Density: 53.8/km^{2} (139/sq mi)
- Time zone: UTC+1 (CET)
  - Summer (DST): UTC+2 (CEST)
- Postal code: 789 63

Bartoňov (German: Bartelsdorf) is a village in Šumperk District in Olomouc Region of Czech Republic. The settlement is administrated by Ruda nad Moravou council. The oldest note about the village comes from 1371. The name origin is connected with personal name Bartoň (the short form of Bartoloměj or Bartholomew) The Bartoňov manor was held by the House of Zierotin to 1561, by the House of Fylčan z Hrabové to 1583, by the House of Odkolek z Oujezdce to 1622, and by the House of Liechtenstein to the fall of feudal system in 1848. In 1871, elementary school was opened, operating to 1976. Population was 130 people in 2001. The area is served by railroad line Nr. 292, the stop Bartoňov.
