= Háj (observation tower) =

Coordinates: 49°58′13.99″N 16°56′1.85″E

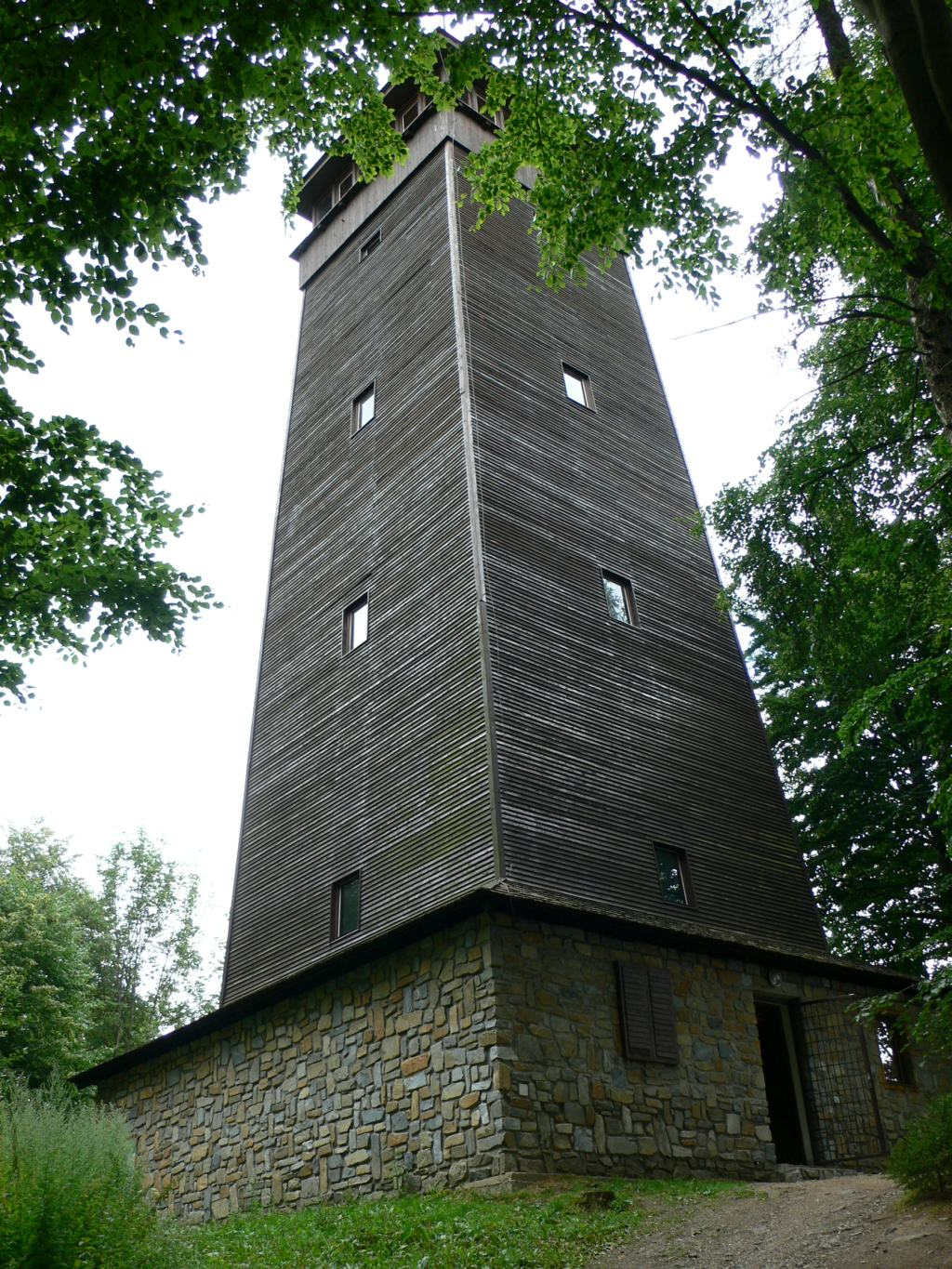

Háj is an observation tower on the top of Háj hill in Olomouc Region of the Czech Republic, about 3 kilometres northwest from Šumperk. Its height is 29 meters and it has one viewing platform. Foot tower altitude is 631 meters above sea level.

== History ==
The current observation tower replaced the original Štefánik's Observation Tower which was erected in 1934 and burned down after a lightning strike in 1953. The new structure was built 43 years later, in 1996.

Investors were the municipalities of Šumperk, Bludov, Ruda nad Moravou, the now defunct Šumperk District and telephone operators who use the tower as a transmitter.
