= Hrabenov =

Coordinates: 49.9775°N 16.9022°E

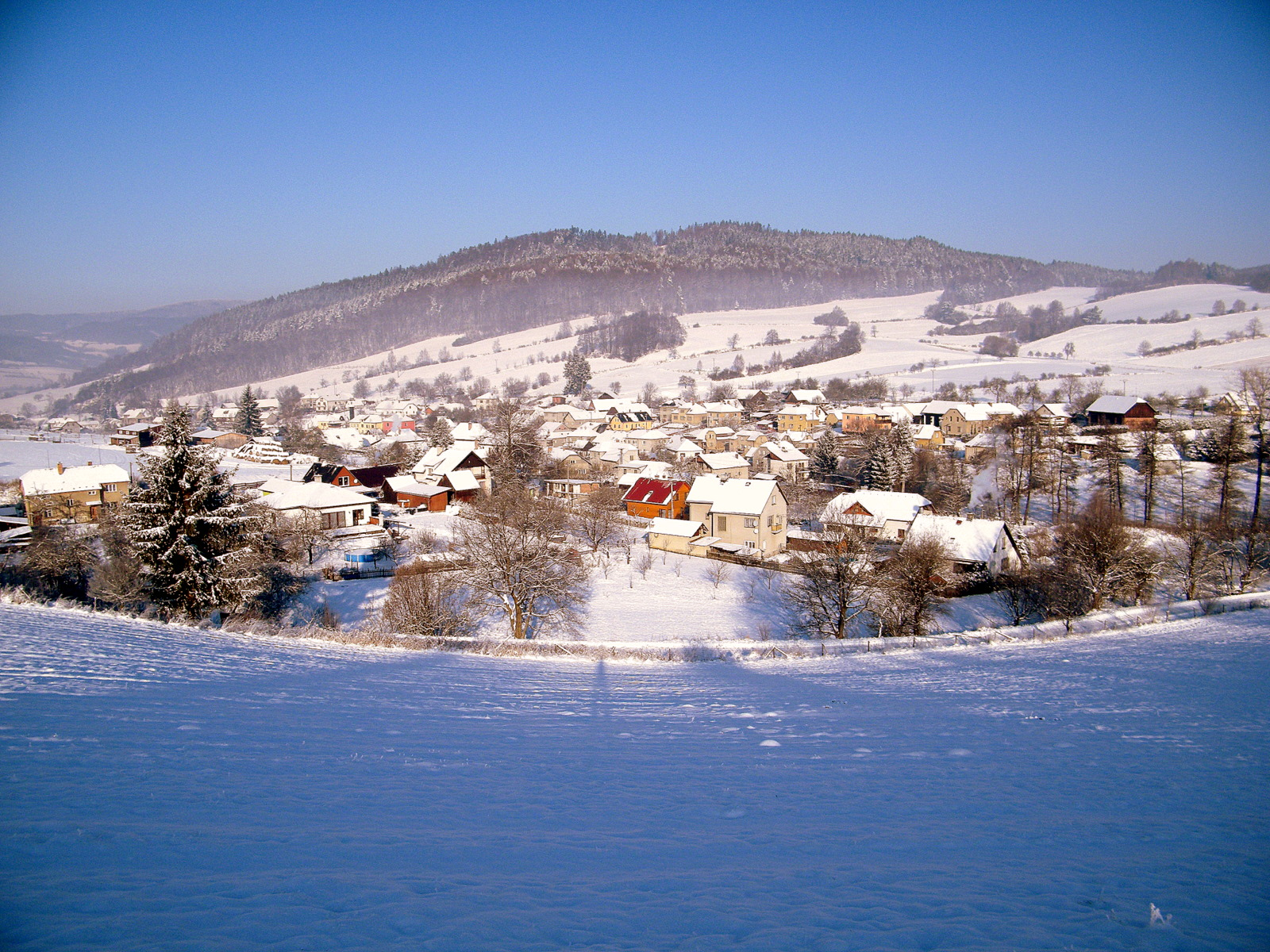
Hrabenov

Hrabenov (German: Rabenau) is a village in Šumperk District, Olomouc Region, the Czech Republic. The settlement is administered by Ruda nad Moravou council. Hrabenov is named after its founder, Hrabiš ze Švábenic a Úsova. The area covers 622 ha and the terrain is hilly with the highest peak Háj (Senová), 631 meters above sea level. Number of inhabitants was 704 people in 2006. The oldest note about the village comes from 1480 referring about its owner, Jiří starší Tunkl who possessed Hrabenov to 1578. From this date, the village was owned by the House of Odkolek z Oujezdce whose property was confiscated for participating in uprising against Habsburg rule in 1622. Confiscated property was assigned to the House of Lichtenstein who held the village to the fall of the fedual system in 1848. Historically, Hrabenov was Czech village with small Sudeten German minority which was expelled in 1945.

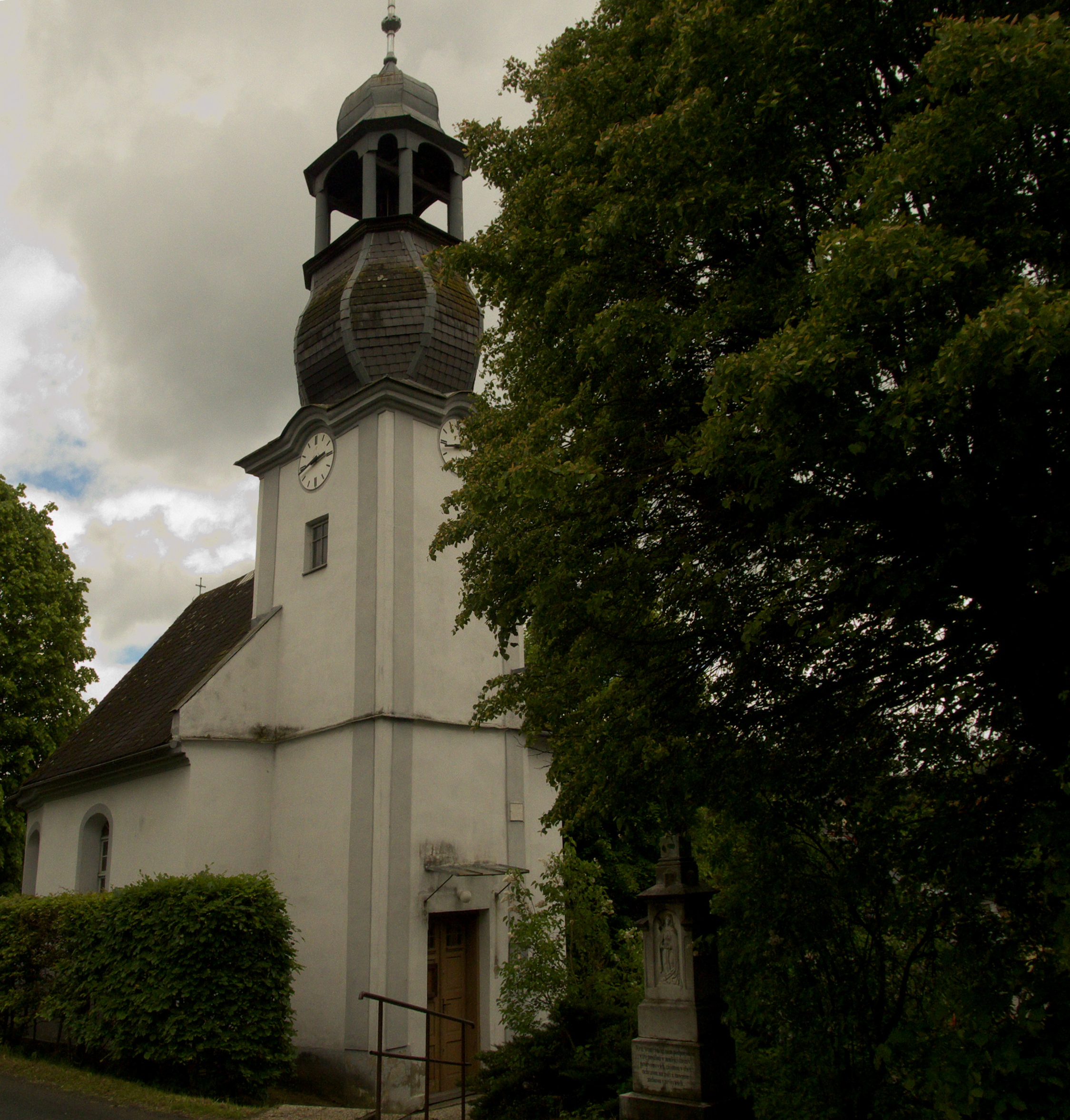
Hrabenov church

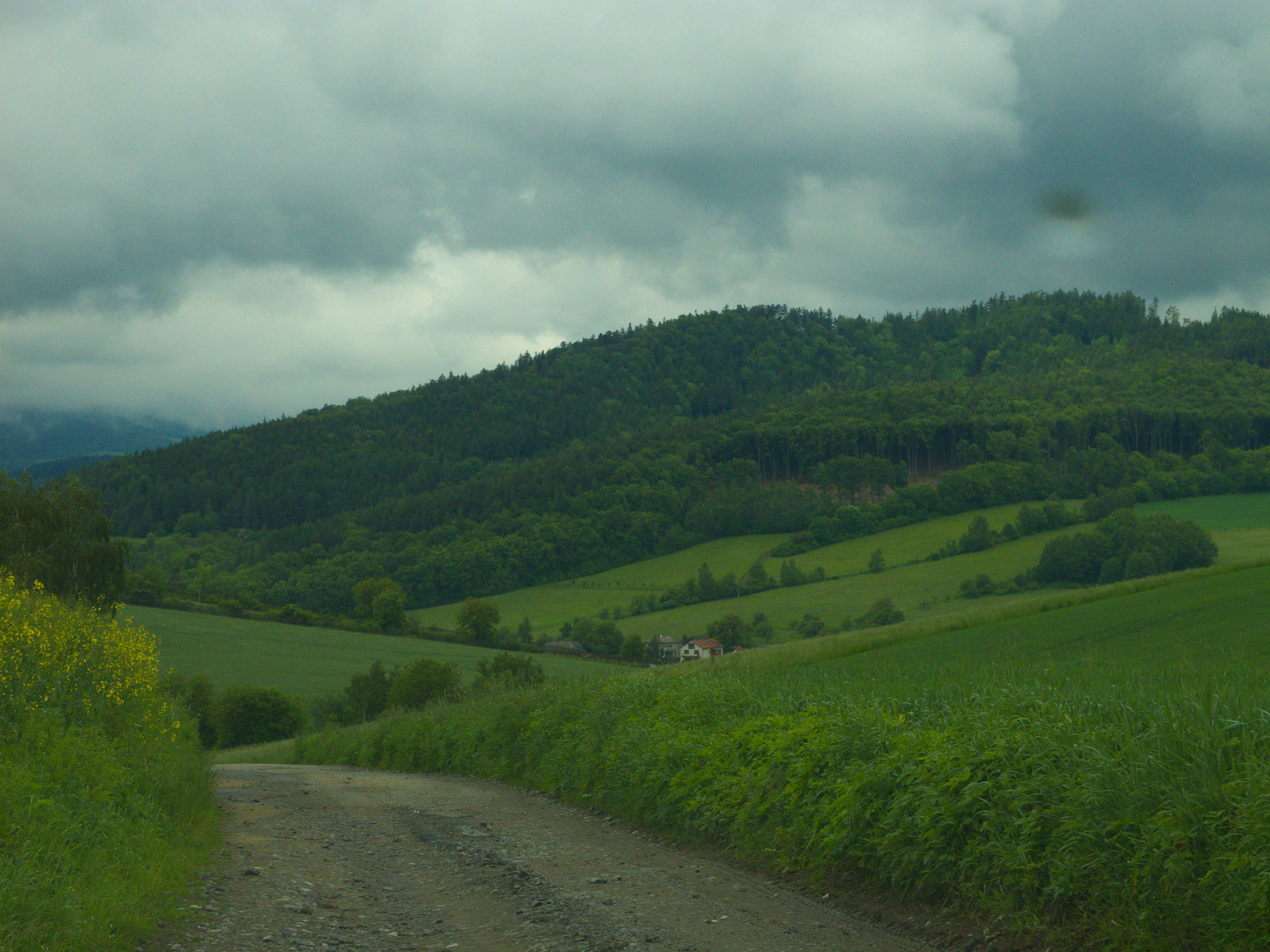
Hrabenov overview

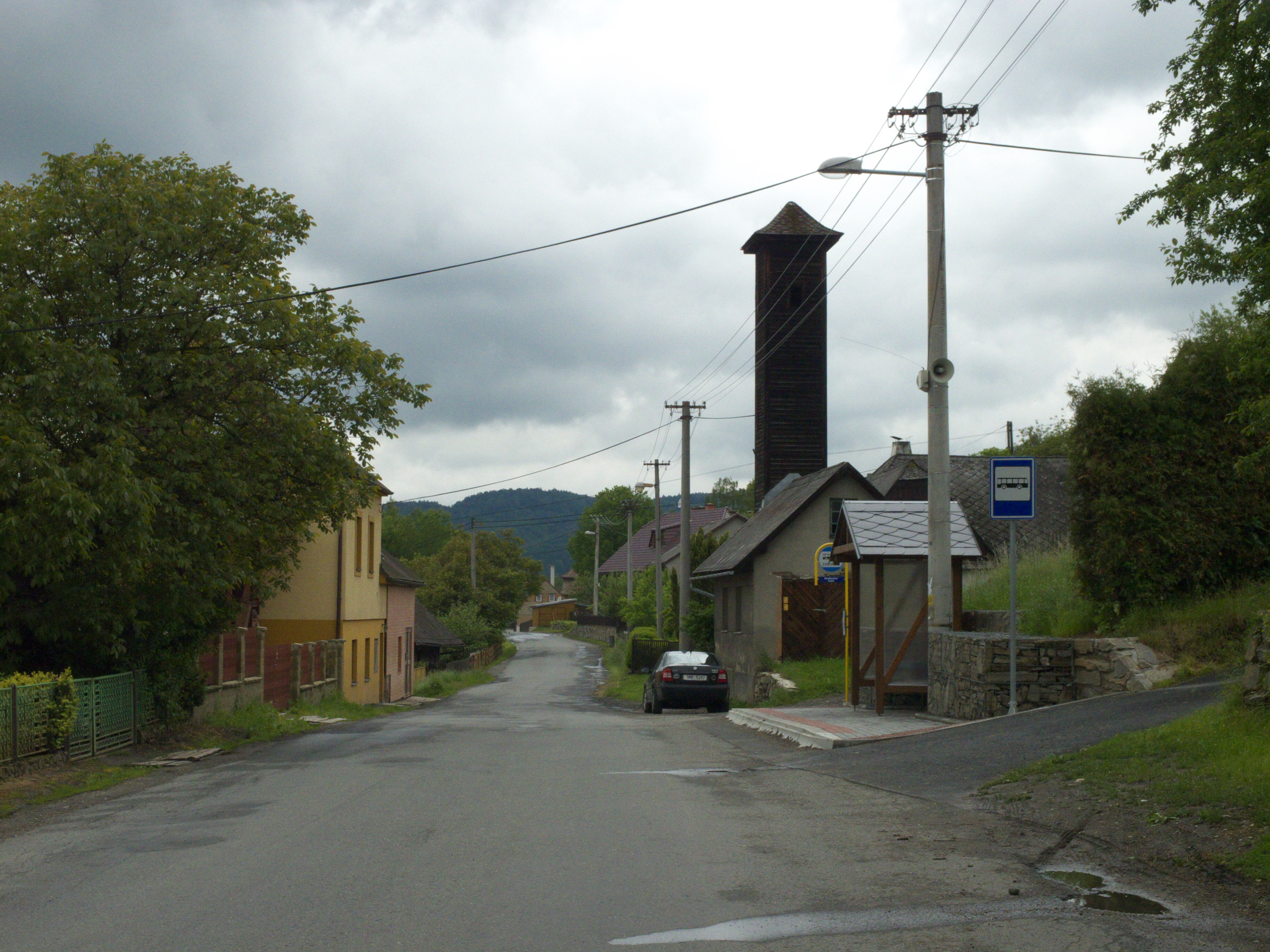
Hrabenov
