= Hostice (Ruda nad Moravou) =

Village in Czech Republic

Coordinates: 49°59′41.88″N 16°52′54.33″E

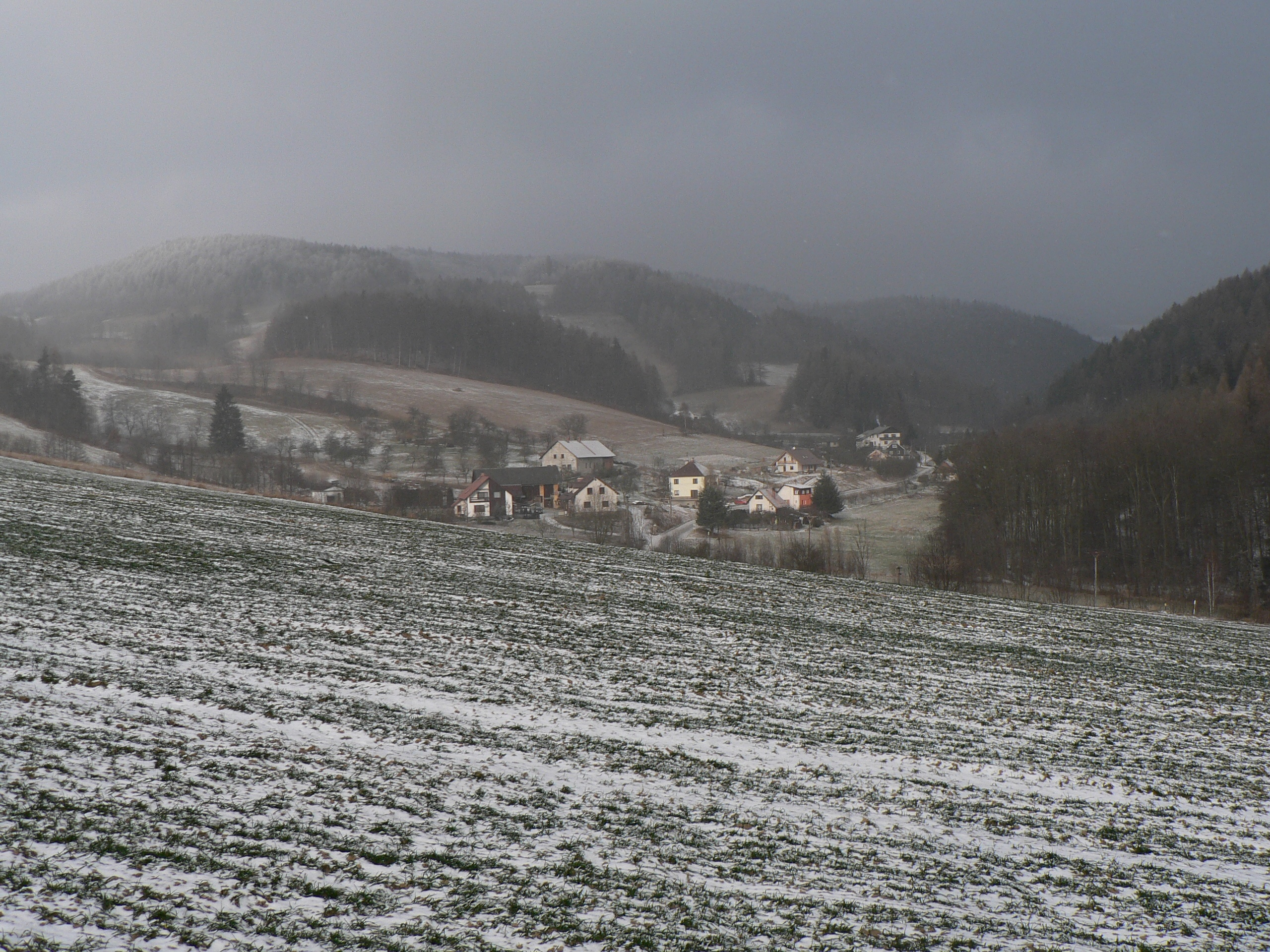
Hostice

Hostice (German: Hosterlitz, local dialect: Hostyze) is a village in Šumperk District, Olomouc Region, Czech Republic. The village is administered by Ruda nad Moravou council. In 2001, the number of inhabitants was 450. The area is served by one bus line.

== History ==
In 1397, Hostice was considered to be two separated villages - Velká Hostyz (literally Great Hostyz) and Malá Hostyz (literally Little Hostyz). Malá Hostyz is referred as deserted in a note from 1489. Malá Hostyz was probably in place of nowadays Pustá hamlet. Hostice was for all of its history part of Ruda nad Moravou manor. During the 1870s, a button manufactory was established. Brushes production was started in 1918 and continued operating until 1991. Hostice farmers resisted to collectivization up to 1957.

== Notable natives ==
- Anežka Šulová (1877-1954), writer
