= Hoštice (Kroměříž District) =

- Municipality
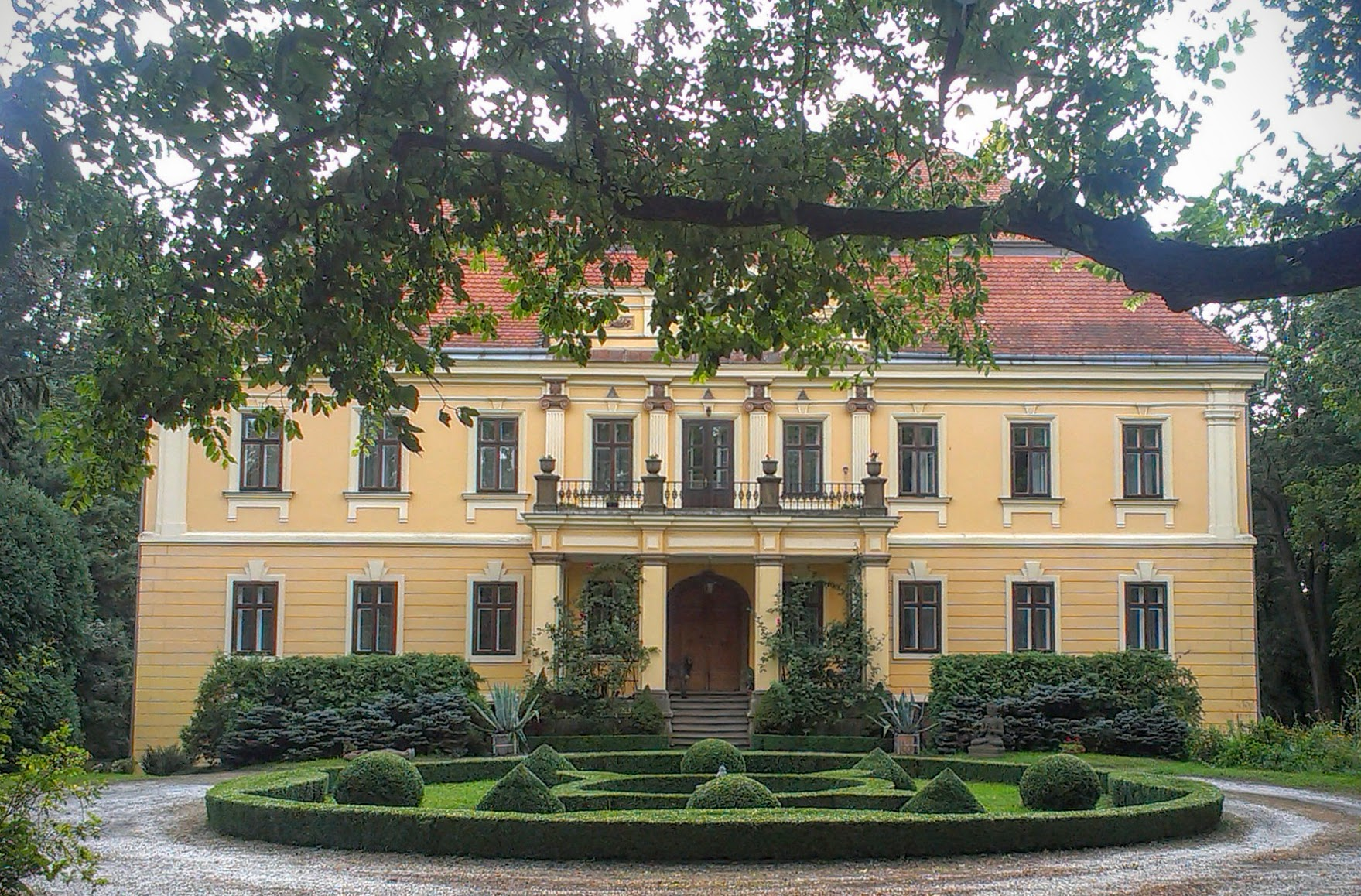
- Hoštice Castle

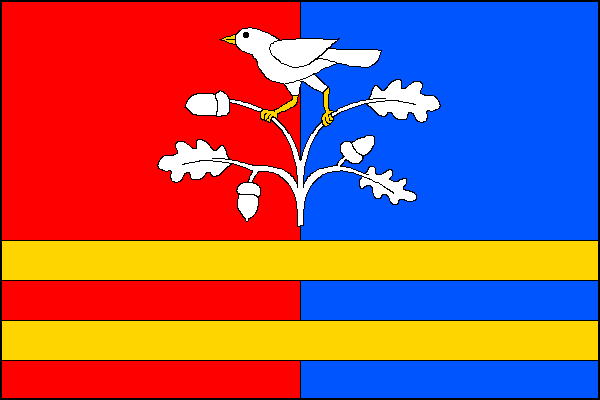
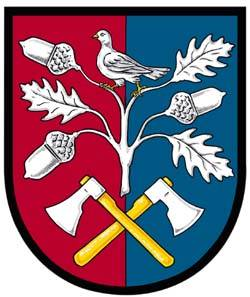
- Flag Coat of arms

- Location in the Czech Republic
- Coordinates: 49°12′31″N 17°14′2″E
- Country: Czech Republic
- Region: Zlín
- District: Kroměříž
- First mentioned: 1141

Area
  - Total: 7.57 km^{2} (2.92 sq mi)
- Elevation: 306 m (1,004 ft)

Population (2026-01-01)
  - Total: 153
  - Density: 20.2/km^{2} (52.3/sq mi)
- Time zone: UTC+1 (CET)
  - Summer (DST): UTC+2 (CEST)
- Postal code: 768 13
- Website: obechostice.cz

Hoštice is a municipality and village in Kroměříž District in the Zlín Region of the Czech Republic. It has about 200 inhabitants.

Hoštice lies approximately 16 kilometres (10 mi) south-west of Kroměříž, 32 km (20 mi) west of Zlín, and 225 km (140 mi) south-east of Prague.

== Demographics ==
Historical population
Year	Pop.	±%
1869	560	—
1880	548	−2.1%
1890	554	+1.1%
1900	562	+1.4%
1910	546	−2.8%
1921	539	−1.3%
1930	510	−5.4%
1950	414	−18.8%
1961	417	+0.7%
1970	367	−12.0%
1980	235	−36.0%
1991	214	−8.9%
2001	173	−19.2%
2011	166	−4.0%
2021	157	−5.4%
Source: Censuses
