= Hostice, Rimavská Sobota District =

Village and municipality in Slovakia

Hostice Gesztete
- Municipality
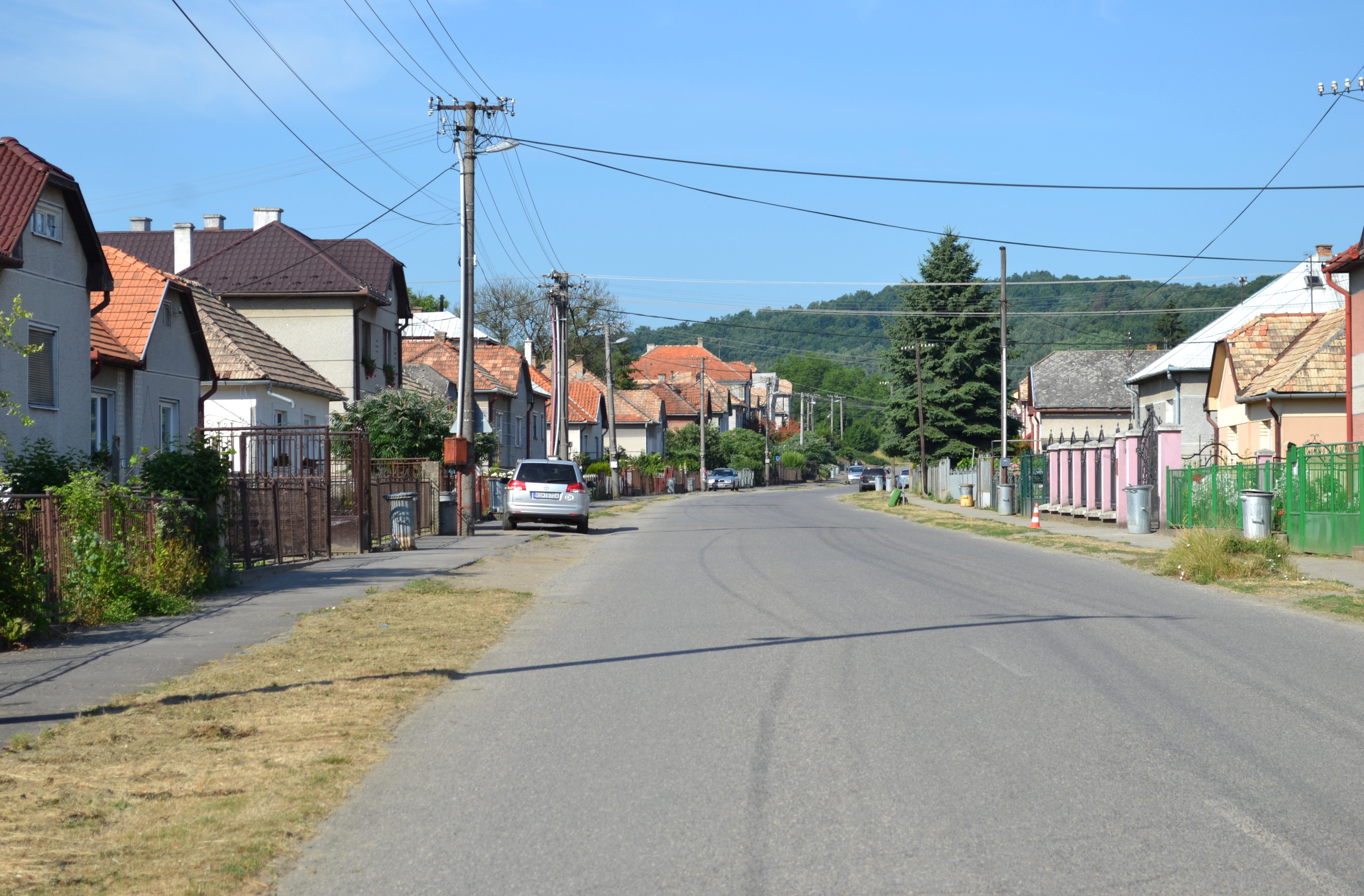

- Flag

- Location of Hostice in the Banská Bystrica Region Location of Hostice in Slovakia
- Coordinates: 48°14′N 20°04′E
- Country: Slovakia
- Region: Banská Bystrica Region
- District: Rimavská Sobota District
- First mentioned: 1332

Area
  - Total: 21.12 km^{2} (8.15 sq mi)
- Elevation: 205 m (673 ft)

Population (2025)
  - Total: 1,058
- Time zone: UTC+1 (CET)
  - Summer (DST): UTC+2 (CEST)
- Postal code: 980 04
- Area code: +421 47
- Vehicle registration plate (until 2022): RS
- Website: www.hostice.sk

Hostice (Hungarian: Gesztete) is a village and municipality in the Rimavská Sobota District of the Banská Bystrica Region of southern Slovakia.

== History ==
In historical records the village was first mentioned in 1332 (1332 Gezeche, 1350 Geste, 1431 Gezthete). It belonged to noble families Ratoldoy and Lórantfy. In the 16th century it had to pay tributes to Turks. From 1938 to 1945 it belonged again to Hungary.

== Population ==
Population statistic (10 years)
Year	1995	2005	2015	2025
Count	821	896	1079	1058
Difference		+9.13%	+20.42%	−1.94%

Population statistic
Year	2024	2025
Count	1055	1058
Difference		+0.28%

It has a population of 1058 people (31 December 2025).

=== Ethnicity ===
Census 2021 (1+ %)
Ethnicity	Number	Fraction
Hungarian	872	83.04%
Romani	471	44.85%
Slovak	117	11.14%
Not found out	51	4.85%
Total	1050	

In year 2021 was 1050 people by ethnicity 872 as Hungarian, 471 as Romani, 117 as Slovak, 51 as Not found out, 2 as Other, 1 as Czech and 1 as Romanian.

Note on population: The difference values of population numbers in the table "Population statistic" and in the sections "Ethnicity" & "Religion" is caused by the use of various statistical methods.

=== Religion ===
Census 2021 (1+ %)
Religion	Number	Fraction
Roman Catholic Church	927	88.29%
None	62	5.9%
Not found out	26	2.48%
Calvinist Church	13	1.24%
Total	1050	

In year 2021 was 1050 people by religion 927 from Roman Catholic Church, 62 from None, 26 from Not found out, 13 from Calvinist Church, 7 from Jehovah's Witnesses, 6 from Greek Catholic Church, 4 from Evangelical Church, 2 from Christian Congregations in Slovakia, 1 from Old Catholic Church, 1 from Other and not ascertained christian church and 1 from Other.

== Genealogical resources ==
The records for genealogical research are available at the state archive "Statny Archiv in Banska Bystrica, Slovakia"

- Roman Catholic church records (births/marriages/deaths): 1761-1896 (parish A)
- Reformated church records (births/marriages/deaths): 1769-1895 (parish B)

== See also ==
- List of municipalities and towns in Slovakia
