= Šumavské Hoštice =

- Municipality
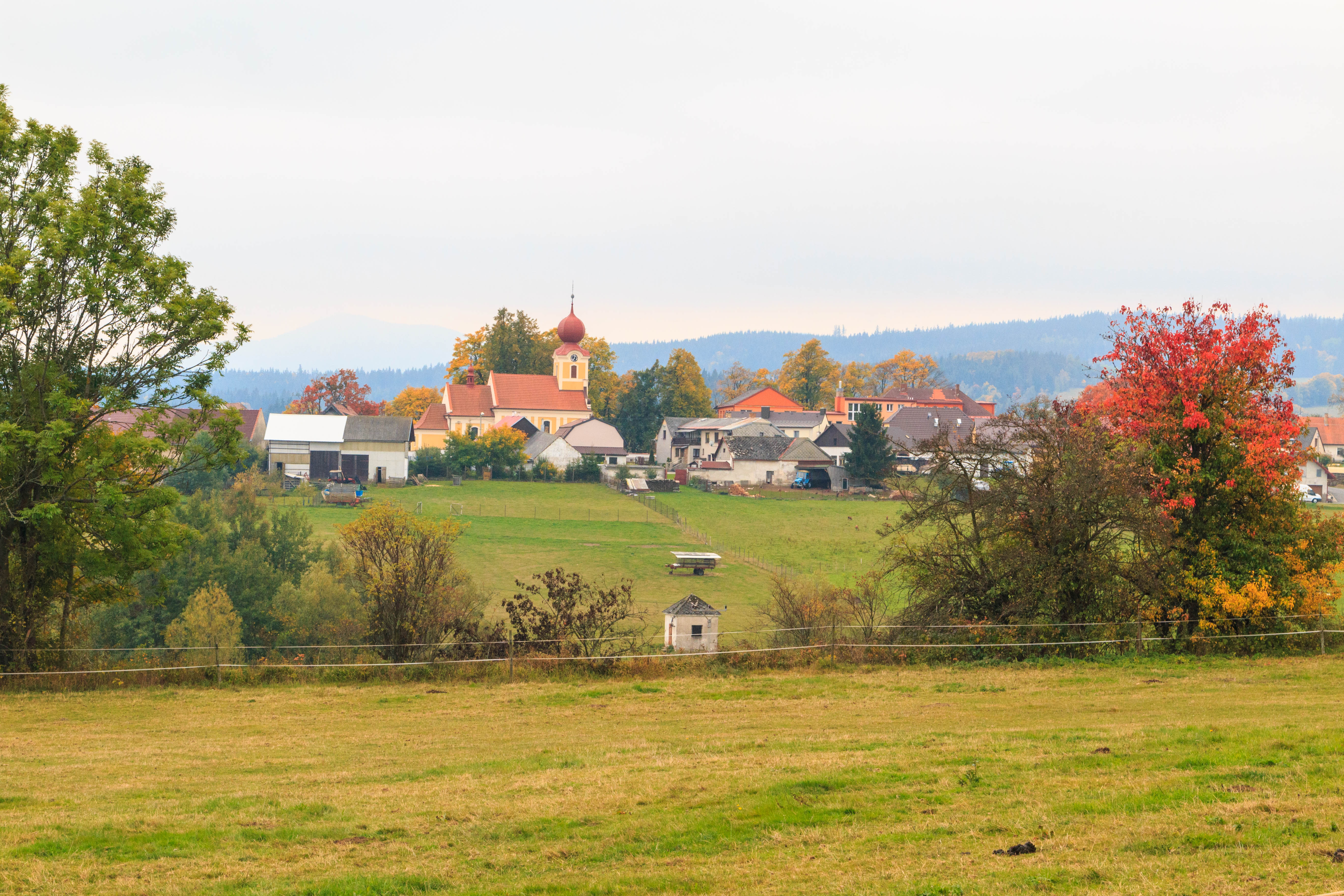
- View from the north

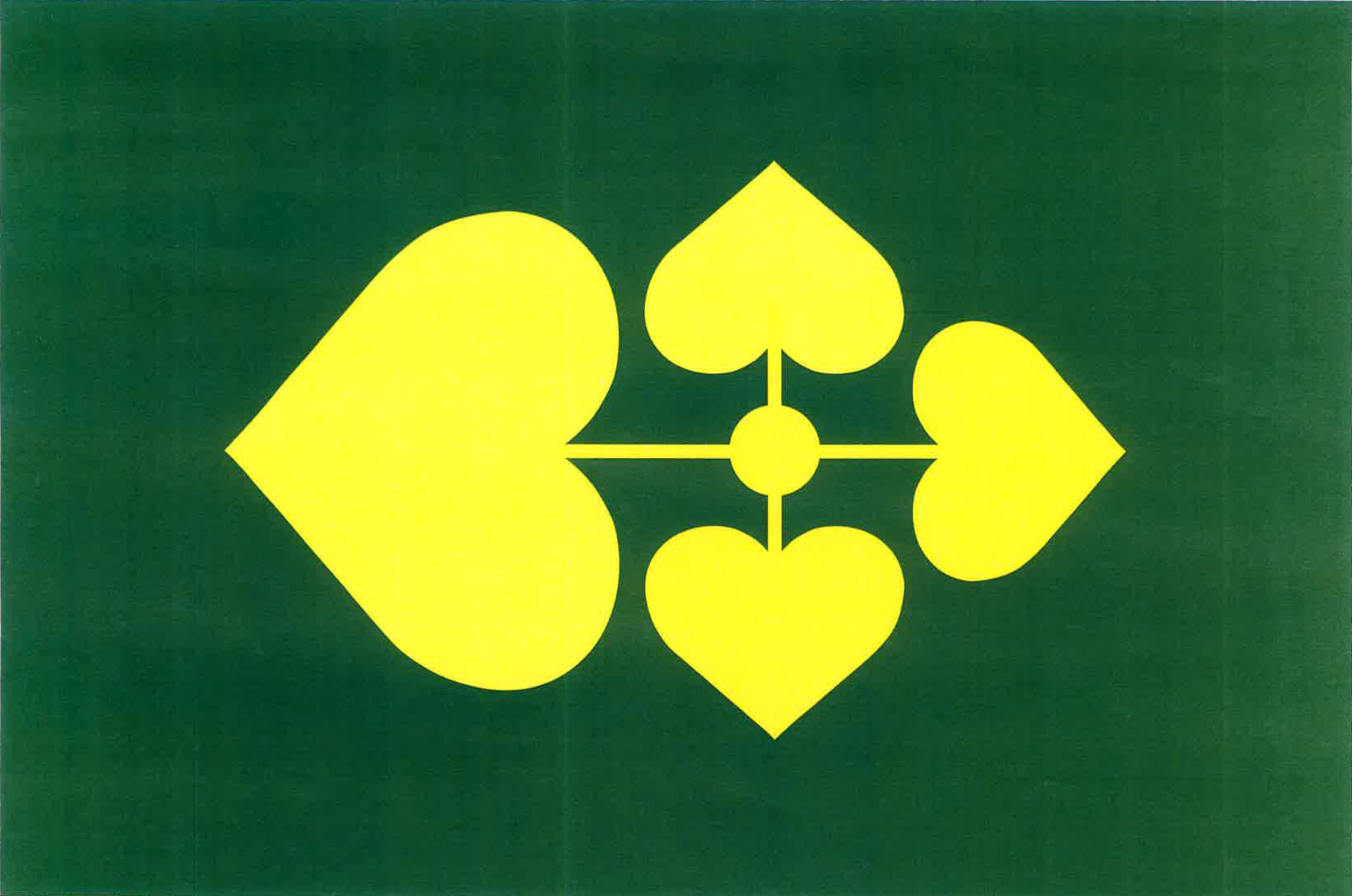
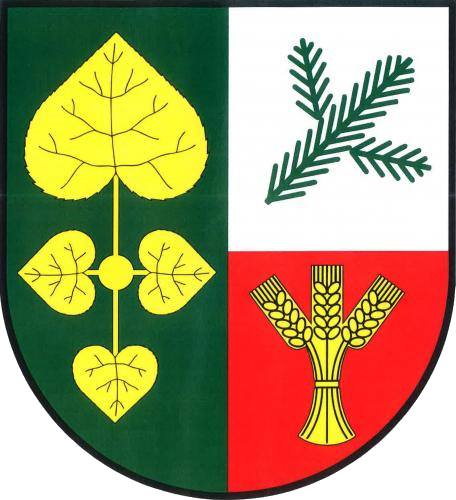
- Flag Coat of arms

- Location in the Czech Republic
- Coordinates: 49°2′22″N 13°52′20″E
- Country: Czech Republic
- Region: South Bohemian
- District: Prachatice
- First mentioned: 1352

Area
  - Total: 8.36 km^{2} (3.23 sq mi)
- Elevation: 765 m (2,510 ft)

Population (2026-01-01)
  - Total: 411
  - Density: 49.2/km^{2} (127/sq mi)
- Time zone: UTC+1 (CET)
  - Summer (DST): UTC+2 (CEST)
- Postal code: 384 71
- Website: www.sumavskehostice.cz

Šumavské Hoštice is a municipality and village in Prachatice District in the South Bohemian Region of the Czech Republic. It has about 400 inhabitants.

Šumavské Hoštice lies approximately 10 kilometres (6 mi) west of Prachatice, 45 km (28 mi) west of České Budějovice, and 123 km (76 mi) south of Prague.

== Administrative division ==
Šumavské Hoštice consists of four municipal parts (in brackets population according to the 2021 census):

- Šumavské Hoštice (322)
- Kosmo (61)
- Škarez 2.díl (16)
- Vojslavice (20)

== Demographics ==
Historical population
Year	Pop.	±%
1869	726	—
1880	710	−2.2%
1890	716	+0.8%
1900	767	+7.1%
1910	714	−6.9%
1921	662	−7.3%
1930	656	−0.9%
1950	489	−25.5%
1961	461	−5.7%
1970	408	−11.5%
1980	376	−7.8%
1991	367	−2.4%
2001	395	+7.6%
2011	391	−1.0%
2021	419	+7.2%
Source: Censuses
