= Troubsko =

- Municipality
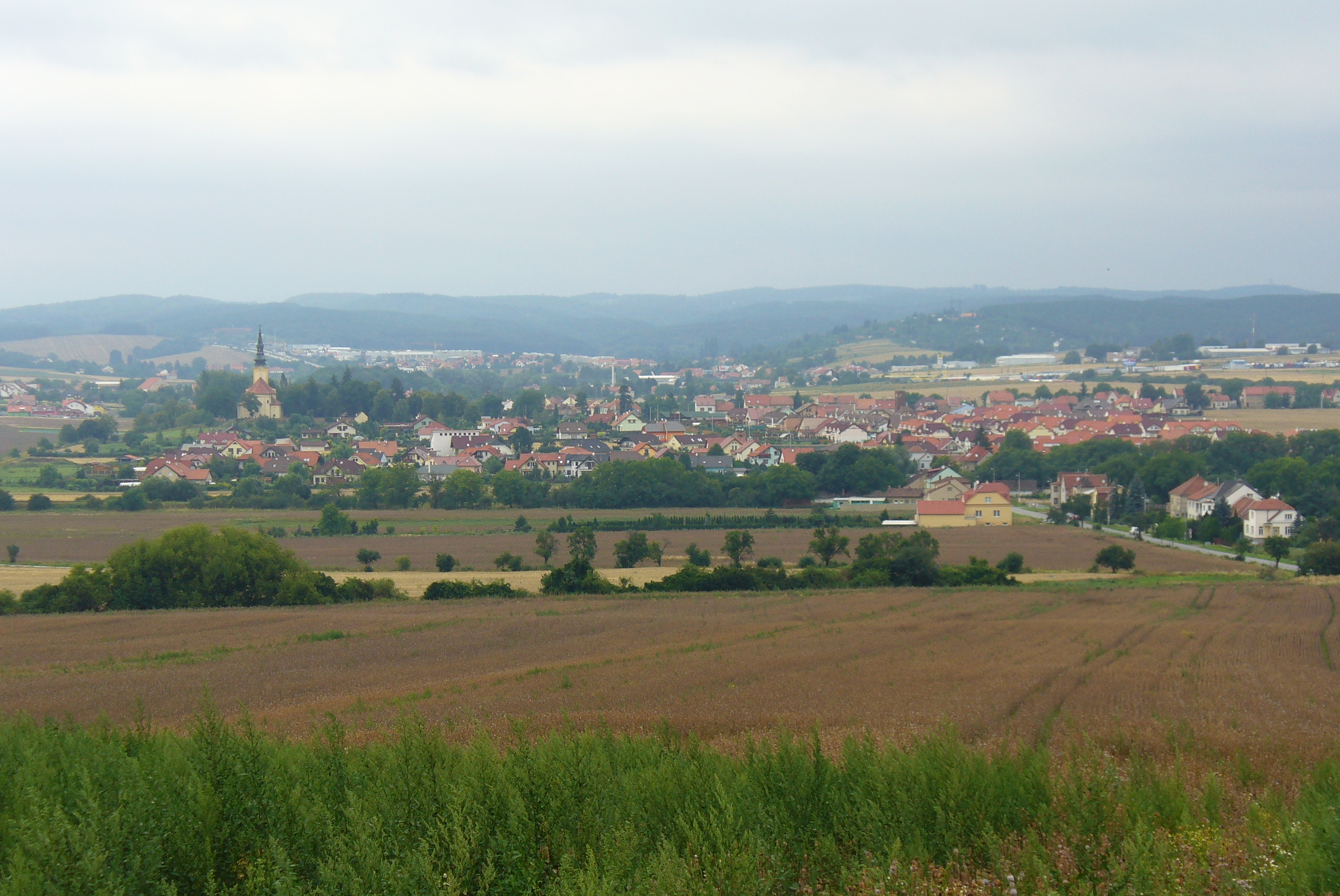
- General view of Troubsko

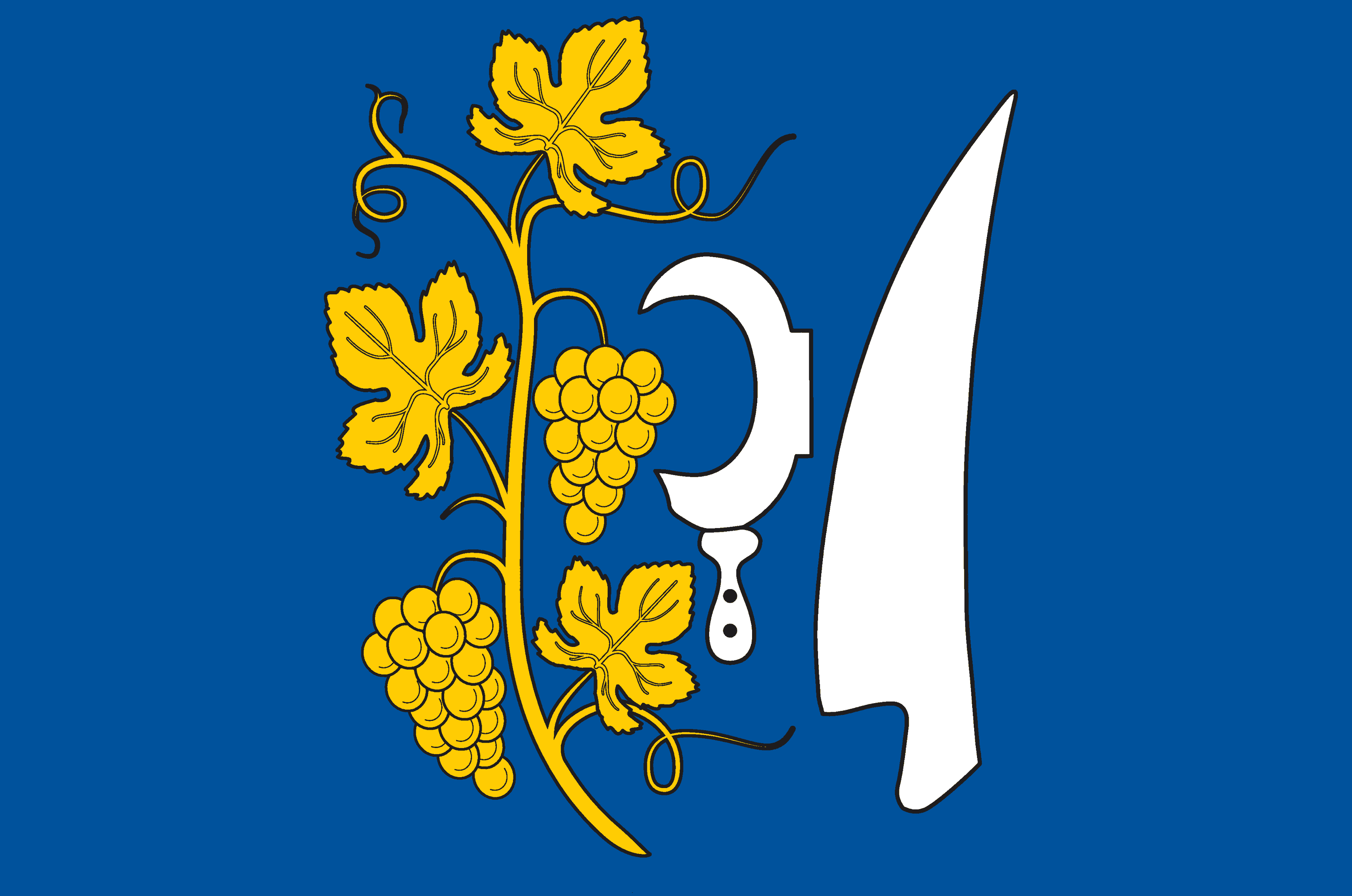
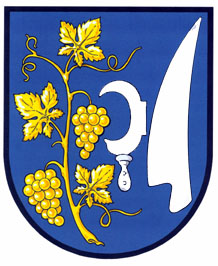
- Flag Coat of arms

- Location in the Czech Republic
- Coordinates: 49°10′10″N 16°30′39″E
- Country: Czech Republic
- Region: South Moravian
- District: Brno-Country
- First mentioned: 1237

Area
  - Total: 6.01 km^{2} (2.32 sq mi)
- Elevation: 300 m (980 ft)

Population (2026-01-01)
  - Total: 2,394
  - Density: 398/km^{2} (1,030/sq mi)
- Time zone: UTC+1 (CET)
  - Summer (DST): UTC+2 (CEST)
- Postal code: 664 41
- Website: www.troubsko.cz

Troubsko (German: Strutz) is a municipality and village in Brno-Country District in the South Moravian Region of the Czech Republic. It has about 2,400 inhabitants.

== Etymology ==
According to legend, in the early 11th, Prince Jaromír was to be assassinated by the rival Vršovci family in Velíz near Kublov. At the last moment, Jaromír's guide Hovora blew his trumpet (in Czech troubil) so that companions from Prague were alerted and saved the prince. For sounding the call to rescue him, Jaromír granted Hovora a settlement which he called Troubsko.

However, the name of the village is most likely named after wooden pipes (trouby in Old Czech) that supplied water to citizens.

== Geography ==
Troubsko is located about 7 kilometres (4 mi) west of Brno. It lies in the Bobrava Highlands. The highest point is the hill Šibeník at 430 m (1,411 ft) above sea level, located in the western tip of the municipal territory. The stream Troubský potok flows through the municipality.

== History ==
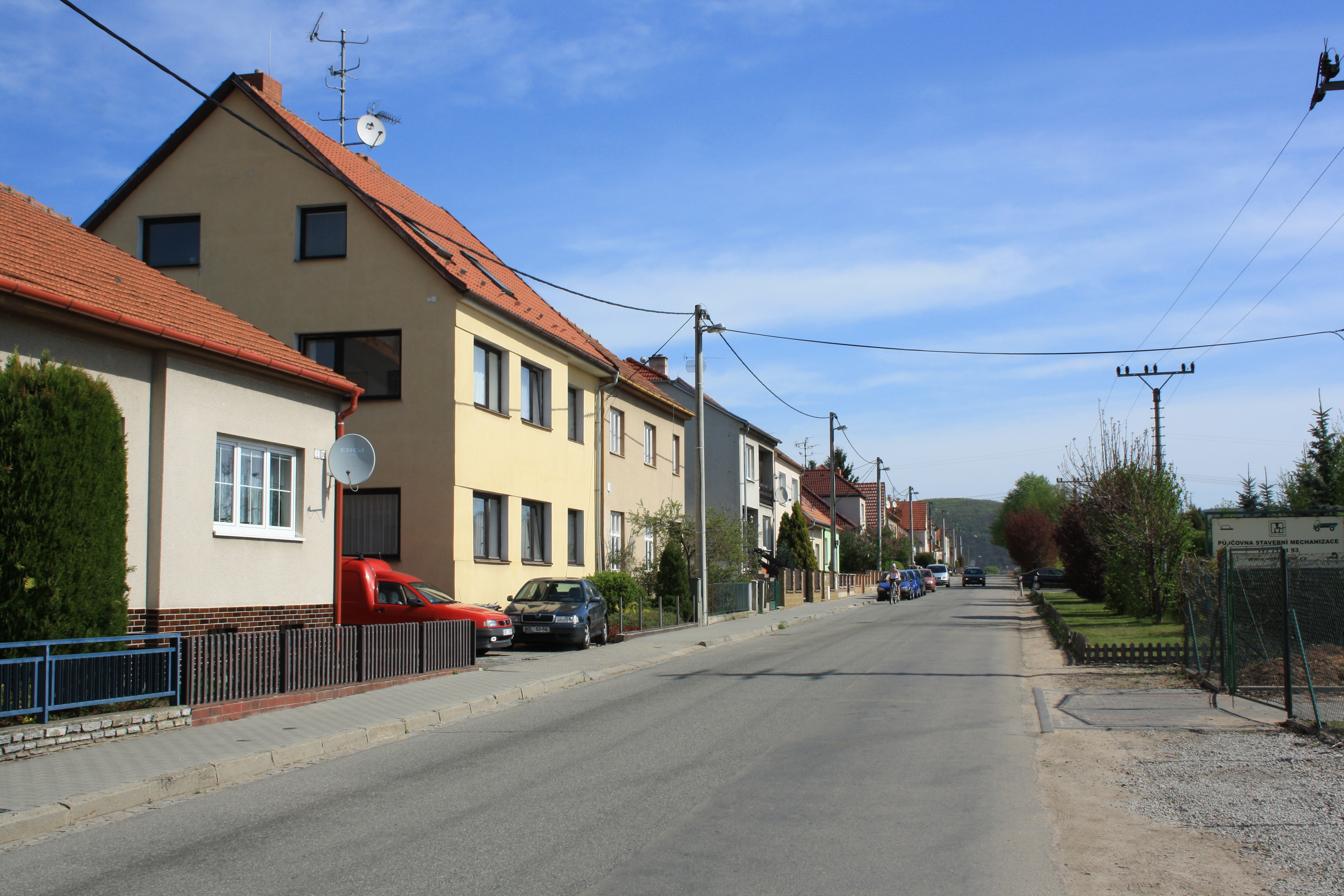
Main road

The first written mention of Troubsko is from 1237 when Robert from Troubsko is cited as a witness in a charter of King Wenceslaus I. The ownership of the village at that time was fragmented to limit several owners. In 1317–1389, there was a feudal estate of the Olomouc bishopric. In 1349, Luder from the Dominican Order in Brno bought a part of Troubsko and donated it to the Herburk monastery. This part of the village was administratively separated from the remaining larger part for a long time. After the transfer of assets of Herburk monastery to a Jesuit college in 1578–1581, it became part of the Řečkovice estate.

The greater part of Troubsko was divided into unequal shares that changed owners frequently, and during the 14th and 15th centuries were held by various noble families. Matyáš Munk from Ivančice bought the whole village and from 1573 until 1609 is cited as the only owner. In these years he had also began the construction of a castle in the site of a former fortress. The next owners of the estate were Karel Elder of Zierotin, Albrecht von Wallenstein and Jiří Rupert Hausperský.

Troubsko reached the greatest economic and cultural development in 1735–1806, during the rule of the Sekora of Sekenberg family. The family devoted themselves to the economy, expanded the number of artisans and supported fish farming and forestry.

In 1826, the estate was acquired by Leopold Hodák. At this time, the school and the railway were constructed. The village was promoted to a market town in 1876, but later lost the title. In the early 20th century, cultural and social development took place.

== Demographics ==
Historical population

Year	Pop.	±%
1869	624	—
1880	728	+16.7%
1890	791	+8.7%
1900	929	+17.4%
1910	1,065	+14.6%

Year	Pop.	±%
1921	1,115	+4.7%
1930	1,359	+21.9%
1950	1,431	+5.3%
1961	1,529	+6.8%
1970	1,451	−5.1%

Year	Pop.	±%
1980	1,491	+2.8%
1991	1,422	−4.6%
2001	1,580	+11.1%
2011	2,165	+37.0%
2021	2,382	+10.0%

Source: Censuses

== Transport ==
The D1 motorway from Prague to Brno runs through the municipality.

Troubsko is located on the railway line Brno–Rapotice.

== Sights ==
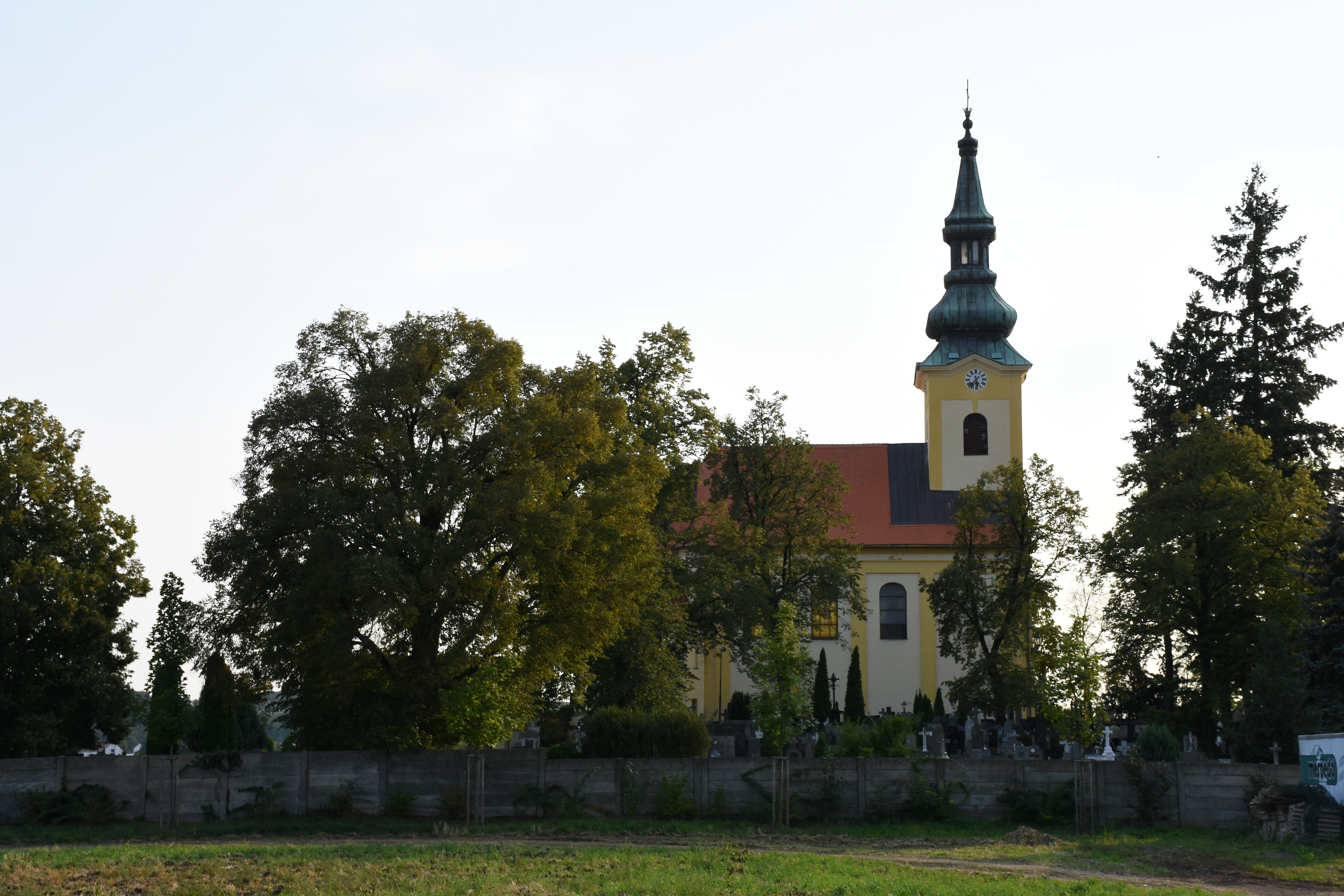
Church of the Assumption of the Virgin Mary

The main landmark of Troubsko is the Church of the Assumption of the Virgin Mary. It was built in the Baroque style in 1746–1758, on the site of a former church from the 14th century.
