= Kublov =

- Municipality
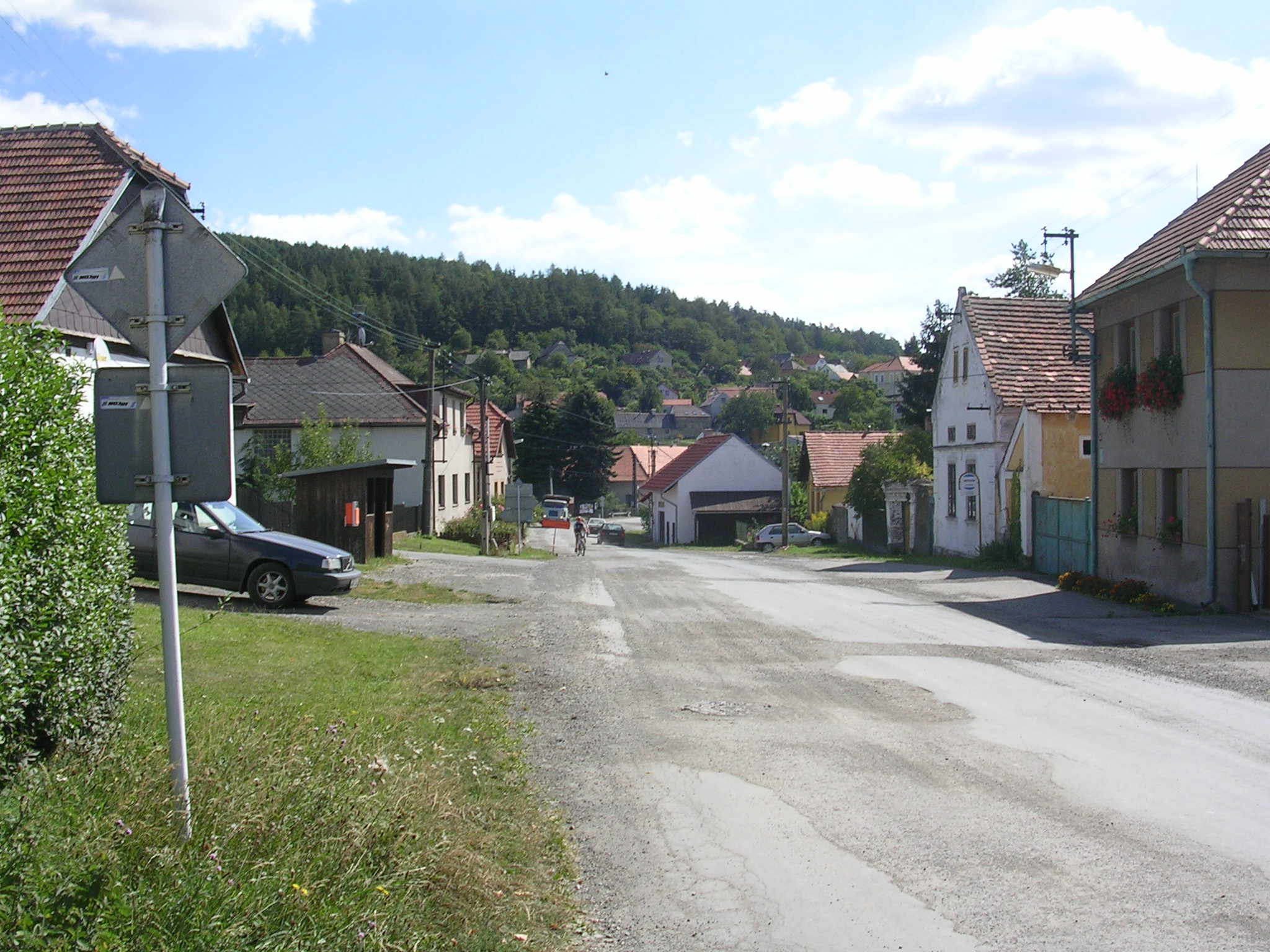
- Centre of Kublov

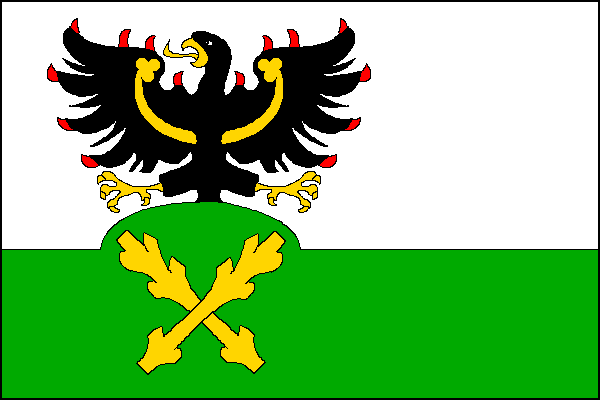
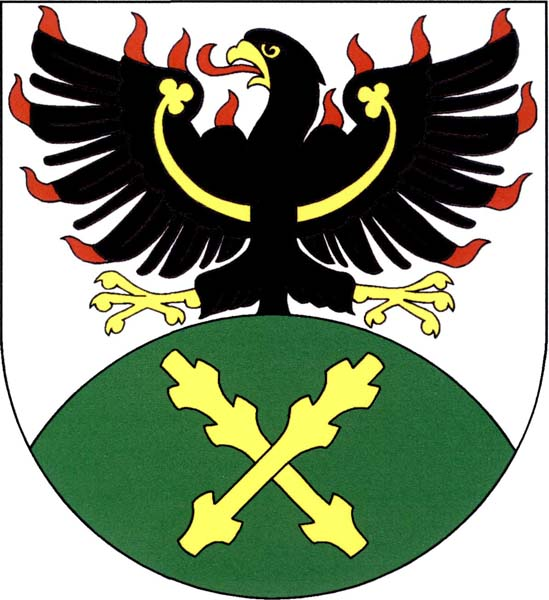
- Flag Coat of arms

- Location in the Czech Republic
- Coordinates: 49°56′38″N 13°52′36″E
- Country: Czech Republic
- Region: Central Bohemian
- District: Beroun
- First mentioned: 1558

Area
  - Total: 6.28 km^{2} (2.42 sq mi)
- Elevation: 439 m (1,440 ft)

Population (2026-01-01)
  - Total: 676
  - Density: 108/km^{2} (279/sq mi)
- Time zone: UTC+1 (CET)
  - Summer (DST): UTC+2 (CEST)
- Postal code: 267 41
- Website: www.kublov.cz

Kublov is a municipality and village in Beroun District in the Central Bohemian Region of the Czech Republic. It has about 700 inhabitants.

== Demographics ==
Historical population
Year	Pop.	±%
1869	980	—
1880	995	+1.5%
1890	920	−7.5%
1900	927	+0.8%
1910	961	+3.7%
1921	916	−4.7%
1930	901	−1.6%
1950	688	−23.6%
1961	740	+7.6%
1970	712	−3.8%
1980	653	−8.3%
1991	564	−13.6%
2001	563	−0.2%
2011	618	+9.8%
2021	632	+2.3%
Source: Censuses
