= Hroubovice =

- Municipality
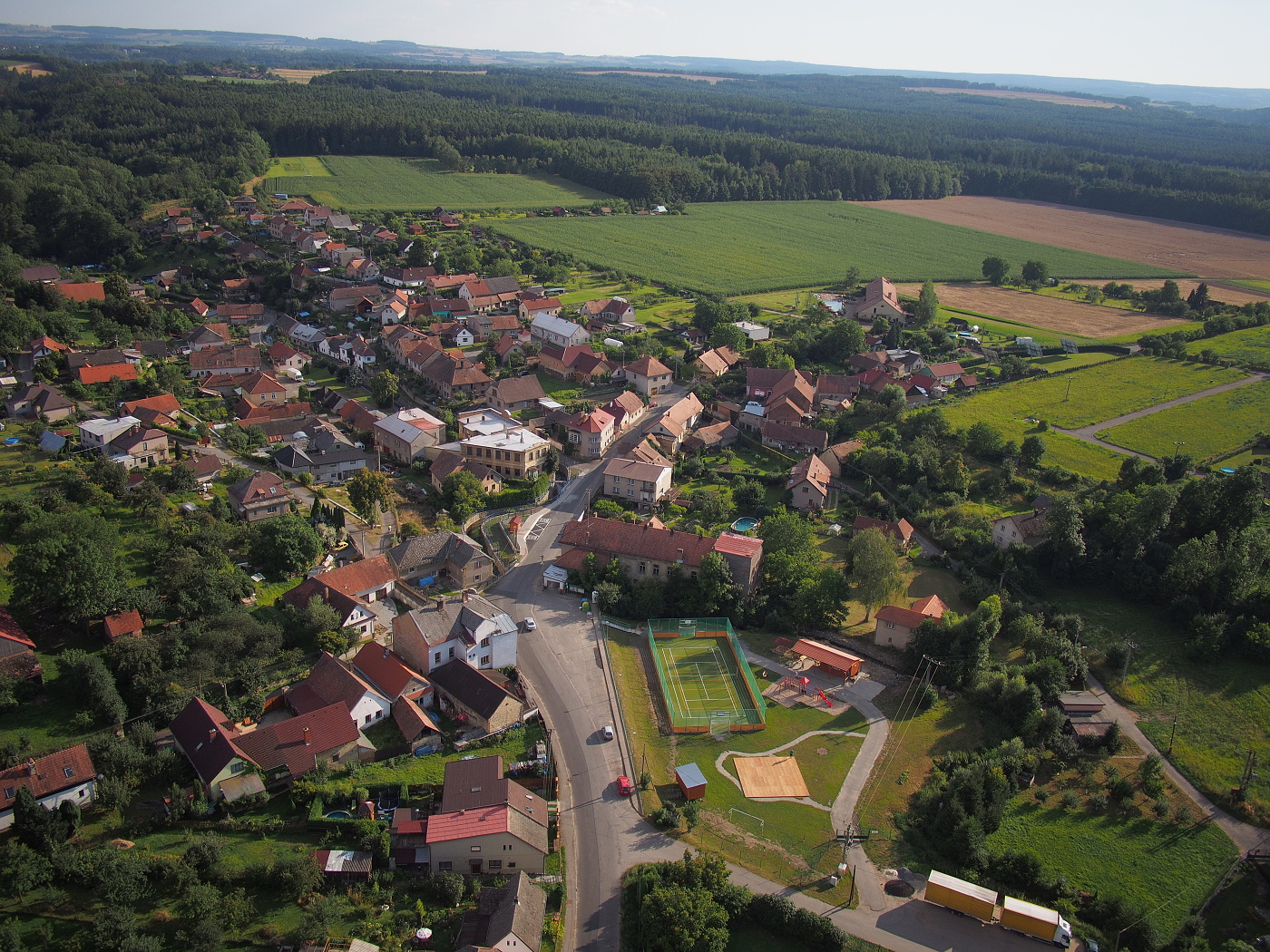
- Aerial view

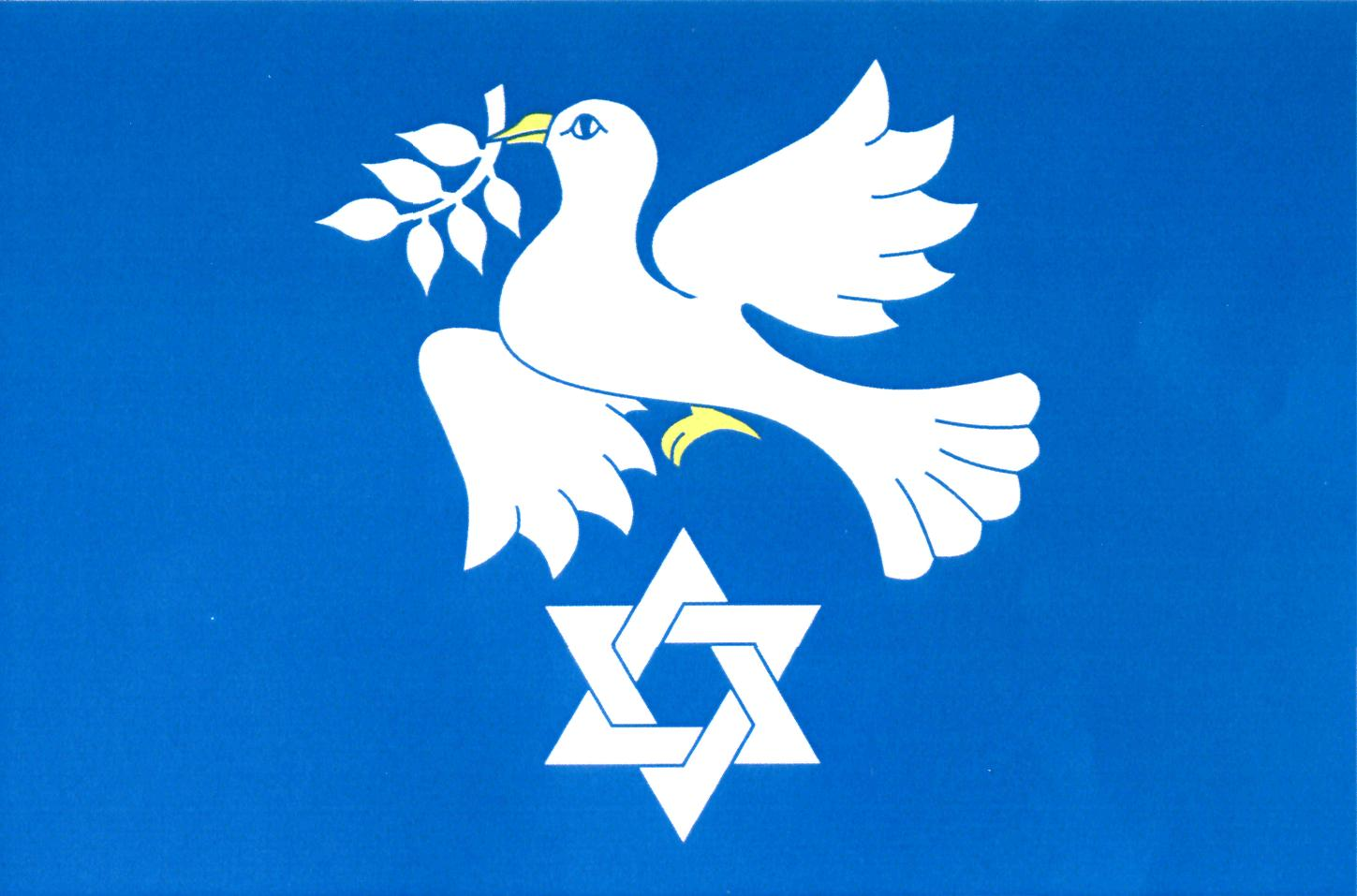
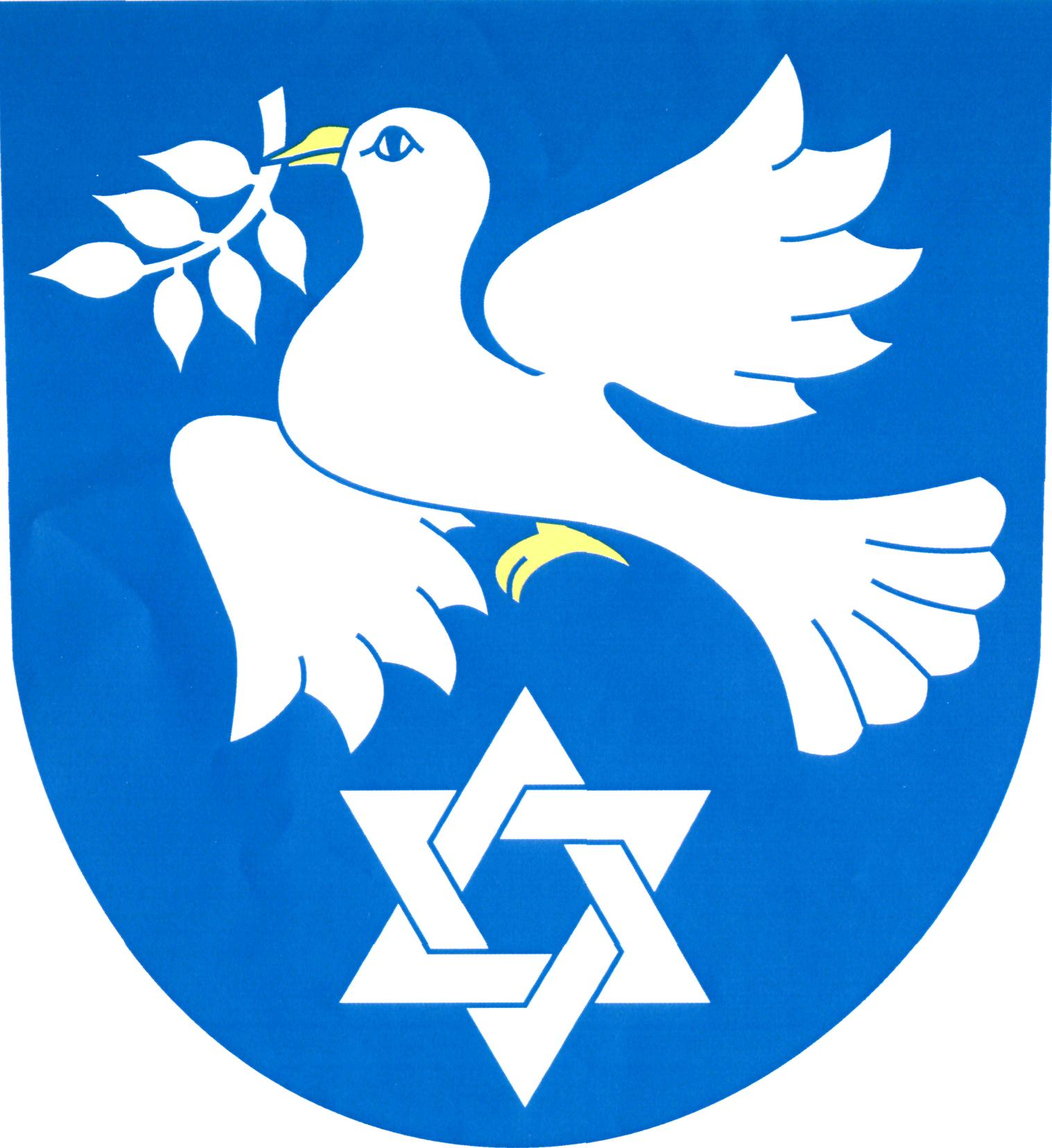
- Flag Coat of arms

- Location in the Czech Republic
- Coordinates: 49°52′57″N 15°59′27″E
- Country: Czech Republic
- Region: Pardubice
- District: Chrudim
- First mentioned: 1167

Area
  - Total: 1.52 km^{2} (0.59 sq mi)
- Elevation: 314 m (1,030 ft)

Population (2026-01-01)
  - Total: 343
  - Density: 226/km^{2} (584/sq mi)
- Time zone: UTC+1 (CET)
  - Summer (DST): UTC+2 (CEST)
- Postal code: 538 54
- Website: o.hroubovice.cz

Hroubovice is a municipality and village in Chrudim District in the Pardubice Region of the Czech Republic. It has about 300 inhabitants.

== Demographics ==
Historical population
Year	Pop.	±%
1869	637	—
1880	646	+1.4%
1890	623	−3.6%
1900	617	−1.0%
1910	693	+12.3%
1921	653	−5.8%
1930	692	+6.0%
1950	472	−31.8%
1961	471	−0.2%
1970	466	−1.1%
1980	402	−13.7%
1991	338	−15.9%
2001	330	−2.4%
2011	367	+11.2%
2021	333	−9.3%
Source: Censuses
