= Habřina =

- Municipality
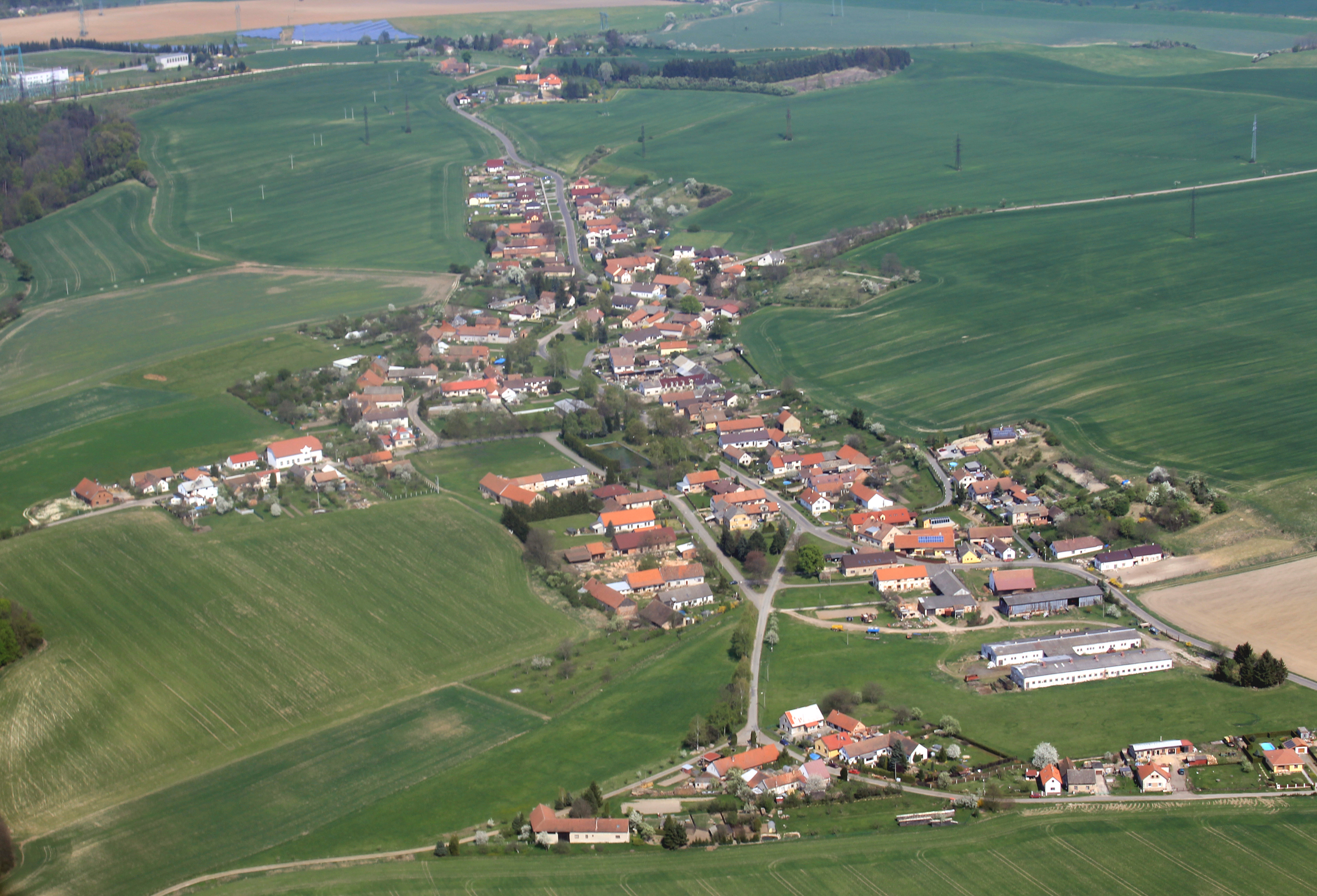
- Aerial view

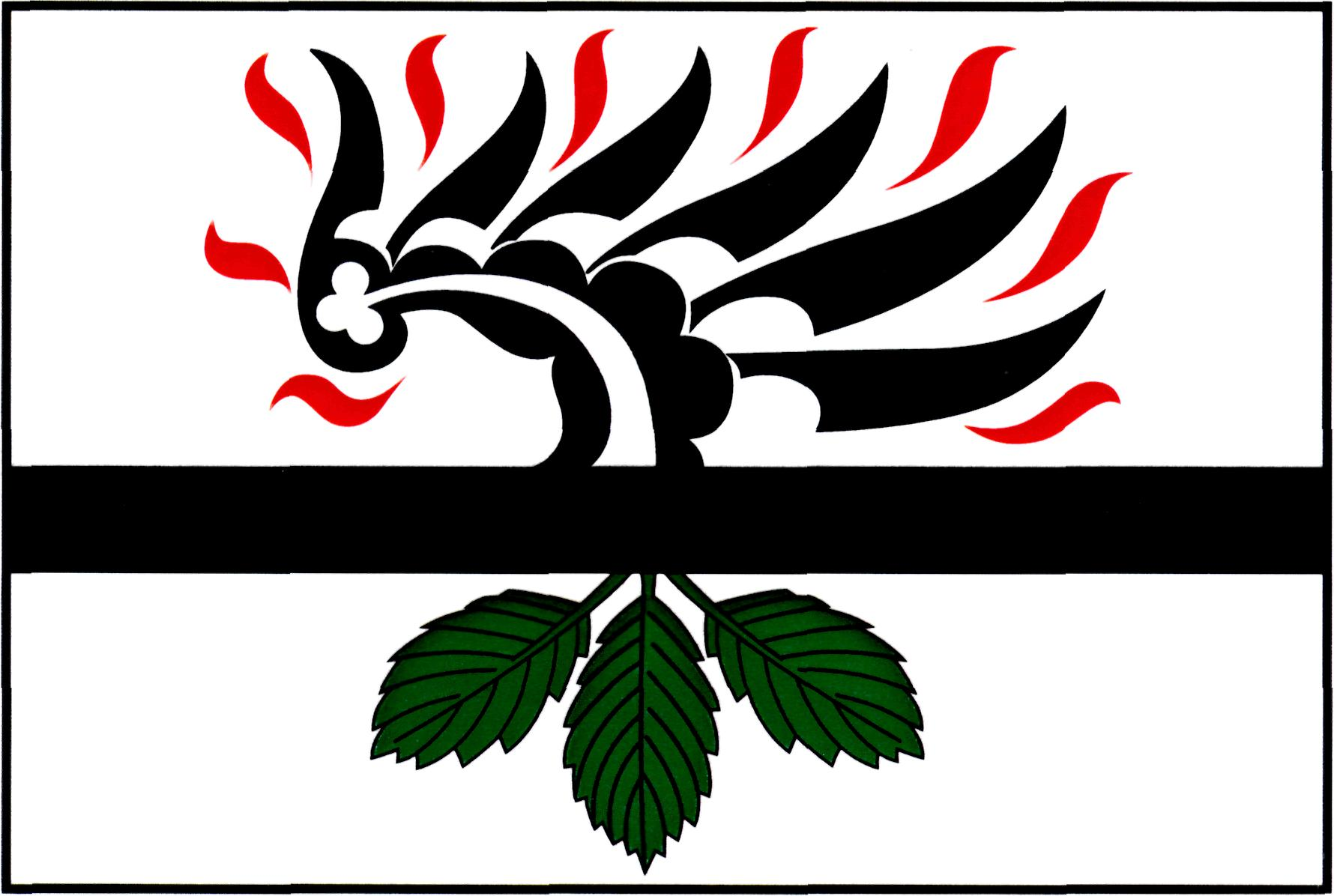
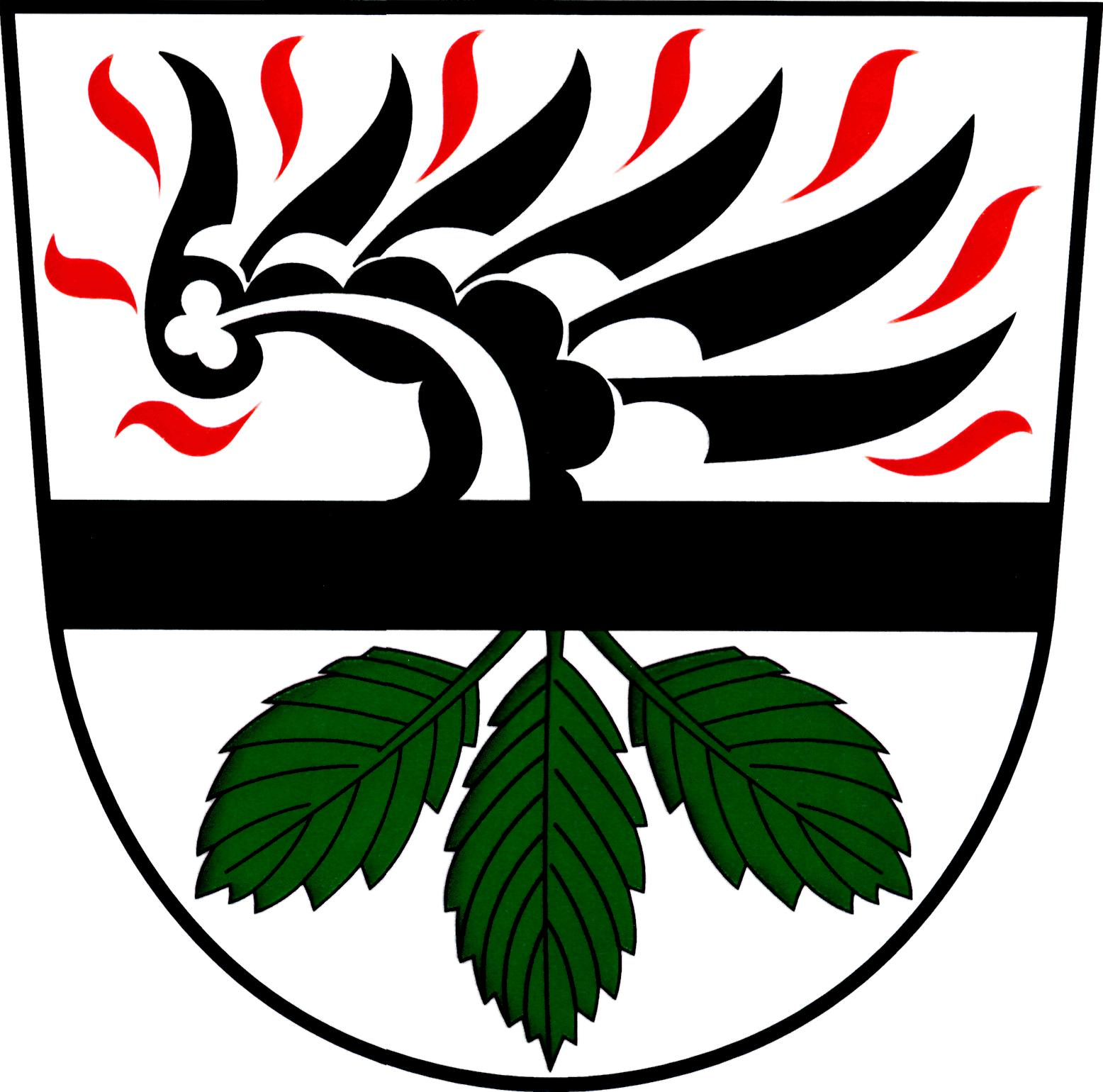
- Flag Coat of arms

- Location in the Czech Republic
- Coordinates: 50°19′34″N 15°49′37″E
- Country: Czech Republic
- Region: Hradec Králové
- District: Hradec Králové
- First mentioned: 1357

Area
  - Total: 6.09 km^{2} (2.35 sq mi)
- Elevation: 264 m (866 ft)

Population (2026-01-01)
  - Total: 316
  - Density: 51.9/km^{2} (134/sq mi)
- Time zone: UTC+1 (CET)
  - Summer (DST): UTC+2 (CEST)
- Postal code: 503 03
- Website: www.habrina.cz

Habřina is a municipality and village in Hradec Králové District in the Hradec Králové Region of the Czech Republic. It has about 300 inhabitants.

== Demographics ==
Historical population
Year	Pop.	±%
1869	563	—
1880	635	+12.8%
1890	661	+4.1%
1900	574	−13.2%
1910	585	+1.9%
1921	565	−3.4%
1930	514	−9.0%
1950	323	−37.2%
1961	279	−13.6%
1970	272	−2.5%
1980	227	−16.5%
1991	219	−3.5%
2001	225	+2.7%
2011	310	+37.8%
2021	322	+3.9%
Source: Censuses
