= Kladky =

- Municipality
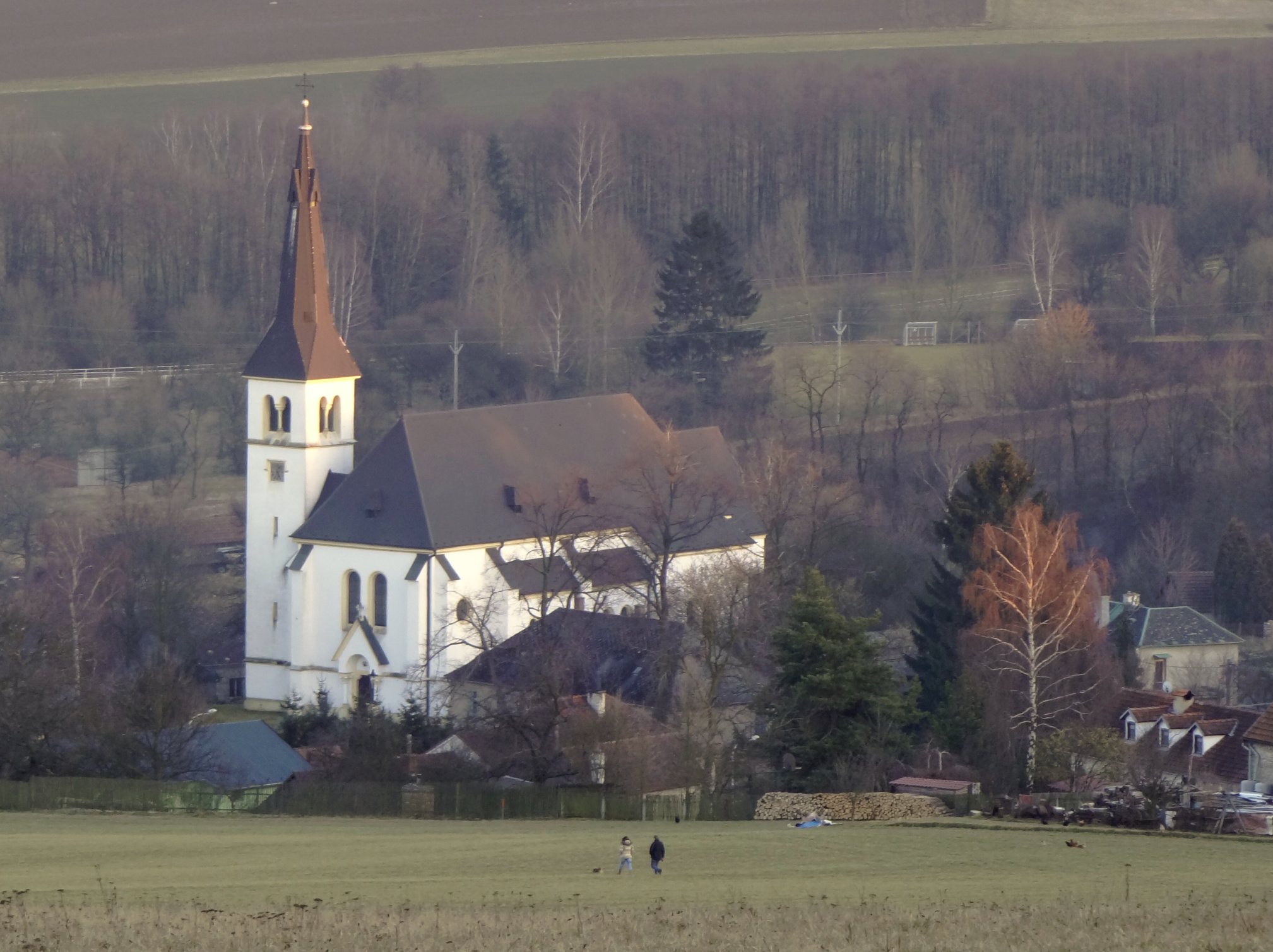
- Church of Saints Cyril and Methodius

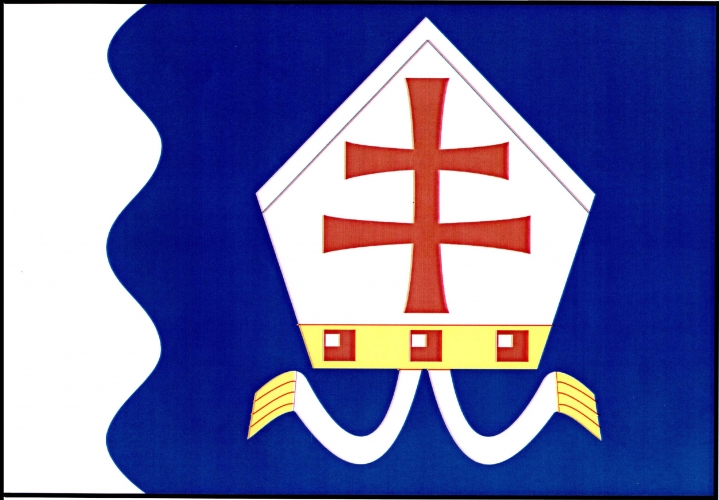
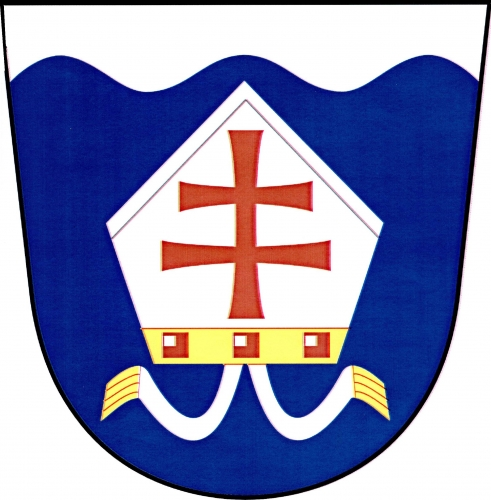
- Flag Coat of arms

- Location in the Czech Republic
- Coordinates: 49°39′0″N 16°50′29″E
- Country: Czech Republic
- Region: Olomouc
- District: Prostějov
- First mentioned: 1317

Area
  - Total: 13.11 km^{2} (5.06 sq mi)
- Elevation: 505 m (1,657 ft)

Population (2026-01-01)
  - Total: 352
  - Density: 26.8/km^{2} (69.5/sq mi)
- Time zone: UTC+1 (CET)
  - Summer (DST): UTC+2 (CEST)
- Postal code: 798 54
- Website: obeckladky.cz

Kladky (German: Rom) is a municipality and village in Prostějov District in the Olomouc Region of the Czech Republic. It has about 400 inhabitants.

Kladky lies approximately 29 kilometres (18 mi) north-west of Prostějov, 32 km (20 mi) west of Olomouc, and 180 km (110 mi) east of Prague.

== Demographics ==
Historical population
Year	Pop.	±%
1869	1,068	—
1880	1,130	+5.8%
1890	1,070	−5.3%
1900	986	−7.9%
1910	957	−2.9%
1921	890	−7.0%
1930	860	−3.4%
1950	594	−30.9%
1961	579	−2.5%
1970	531	−8.3%
1980	478	−10.0%
1991	422	−11.7%
2001	428	+1.4%
2011	360	−15.9%
2021	336	−6.7%
Source: Censuses
