= Vranovská Ves =

- Municipality
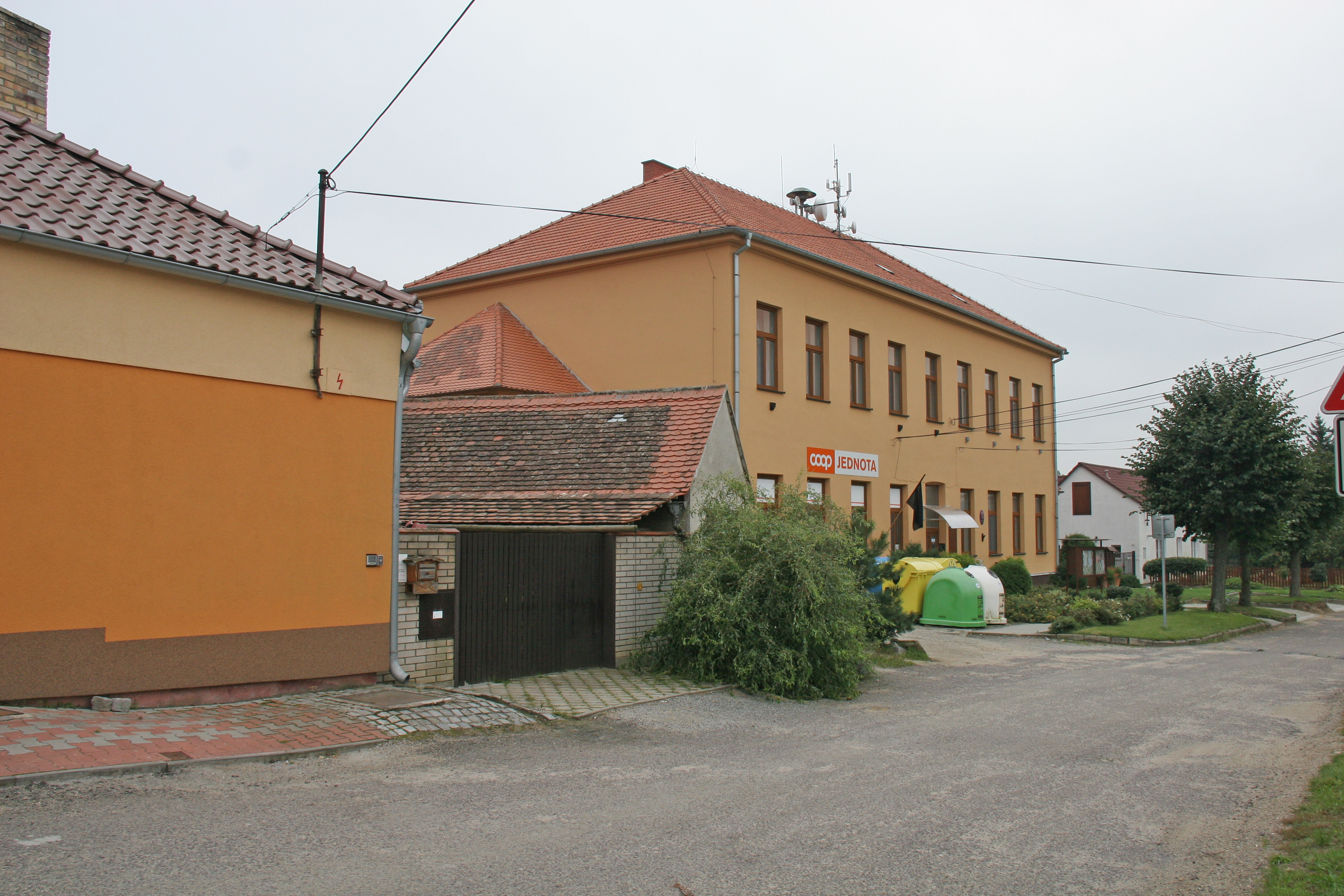
- Municipal office

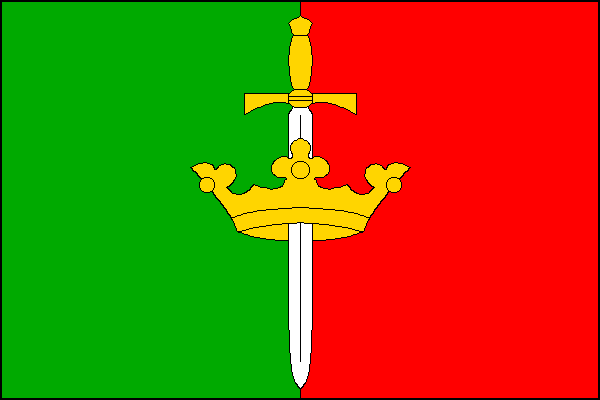
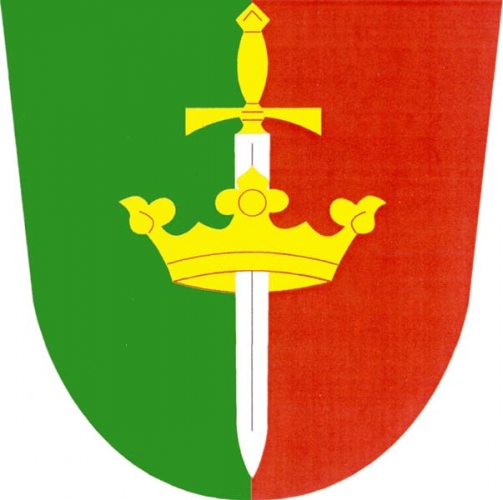
- Flag Coat of arms

- Location in the Czech Republic
- Coordinates: 48°57′6″N 15°55′7″E
- Country: Czech Republic
- Region: South Moravian
- District: Znojmo
- First mentioned: 1662

Area
  - Total: 4.28 km^{2} (1.65 sq mi)
- Elevation: 385 m (1,263 ft)

Population (2026-01-01)
  - Total: 284
  - Density: 66.4/km^{2} (172/sq mi)
- Time zone: UTC+1 (CET)
  - Summer (DST): UTC+2 (CEST)
- Postal code: 671 51
- Website: www.vranovska-ves.cz

Vranovská Ves (German: Frainersdorf) is a municipality and village in Znojmo District in the South Moravian Region of the Czech Republic. It has about 300 inhabitants.

Vranovská Ves lies approximately 14 kilometres (9 mi) north-west of Znojmo, 59 km (37 mi) south-west of Brno, and 167 km (104 mi) south-east of Prague.

== Demographics ==
Historical population
Year	Pop.	±%
1869	563	—
1880	572	+1.6%
1890	543	−5.1%
1900	641	+18.0%
1910	752	+17.3%
1921	607	−19.3%
1930	542	−10.7%
1950	361	−33.4%
1961	396	+9.7%
1970	320	−19.2%
1980	289	−9.7%
1991	253	−12.5%
2001	252	−0.4%
2011	247	−2.0%
2021	264	+6.9%
Source: Censuses
