= Čistěves =

- Municipality
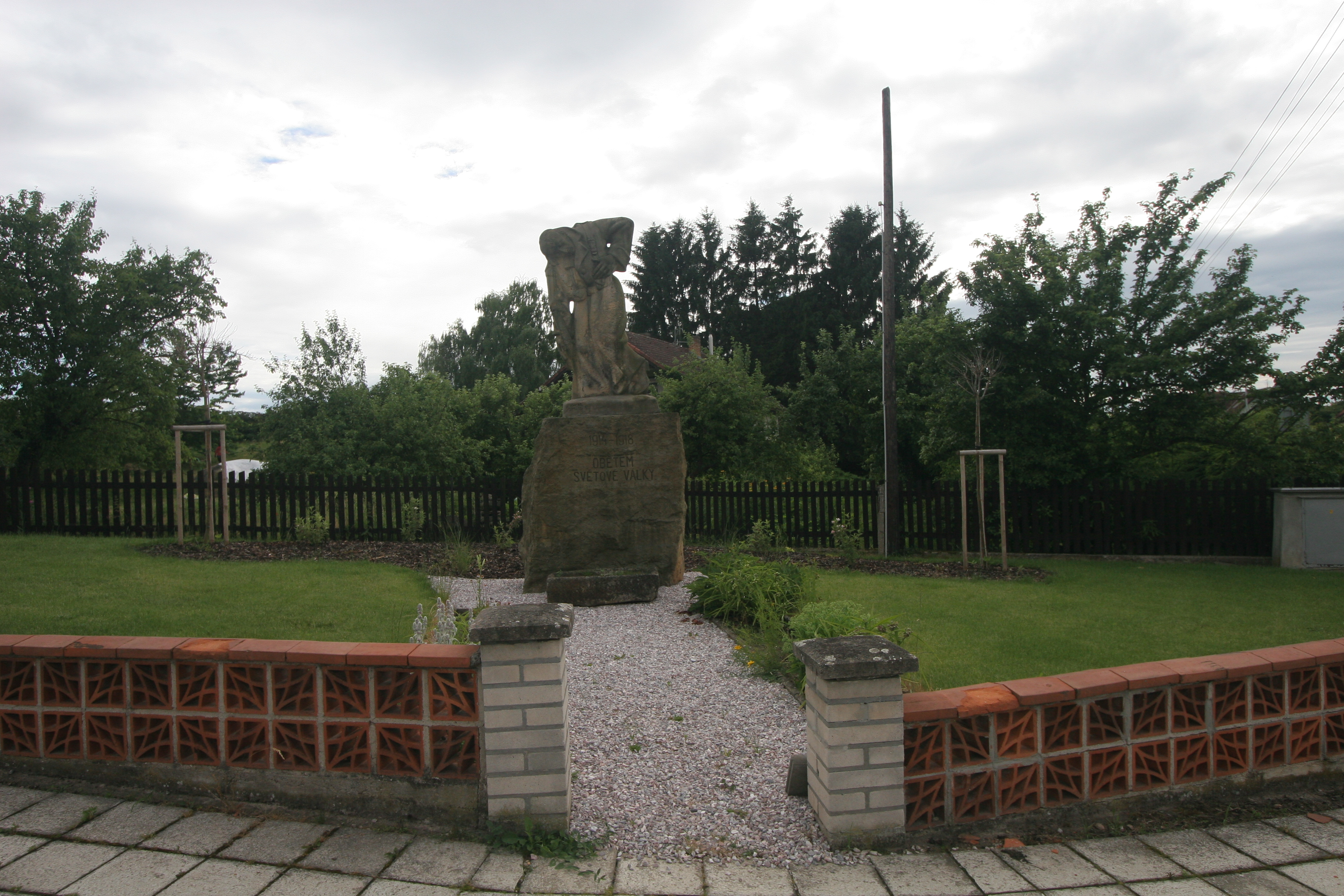
- Memorial to the Fallen

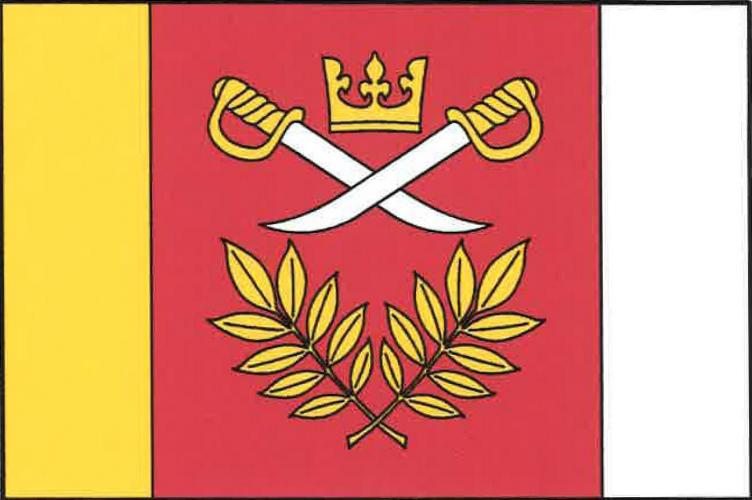
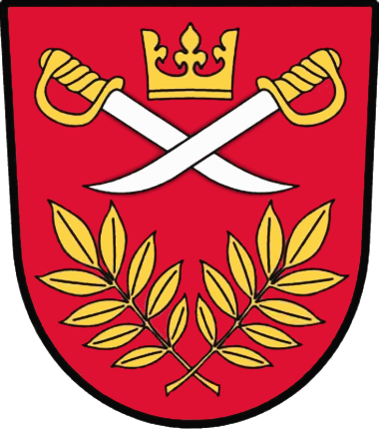
- Flag Coat of arms

- Location in the Czech Republic
- Coordinates: 50°17′20″N 15°43′55″E
- Country: Czech Republic
- Region: Hradec Králové
- District: Hradec Králové
- First mentioned: 1225

Area
  - Total: 2.60 km^{2} (1.00 sq mi)
- Elevation: 280 m (920 ft)

Population (2026-01-01)
  - Total: 197
  - Density: 75.8/km^{2} (196/sq mi)
- Time zone: UTC+1 (CET)
  - Summer (DST): UTC+2 (CEST)
- Postal code: 503 15
- Website: www.cisteves.cz

Čistěves is a municipality and village in Hradec Králové District in the Hradec Králové Region of the Czech Republic. It has about 200 inhabitants.

== Demographics ==
Historical population
Year	Pop.	±%
1869	188	—
1880	166	−11.7%
1890	207	+24.7%
1900	175	−15.5%
1910	209	+19.4%
1921	183	−12.4%
1930	200	+9.3%
1950	113	−43.5%
1961	128	+13.3%
1970	121	−5.5%
1980	115	−5.0%
1991	103	−10.4%
2001	107	+3.9%
2011	156	+45.8%
2021	170	+9.0%
Source: Censuses
