= Pesvice =

- Municipality
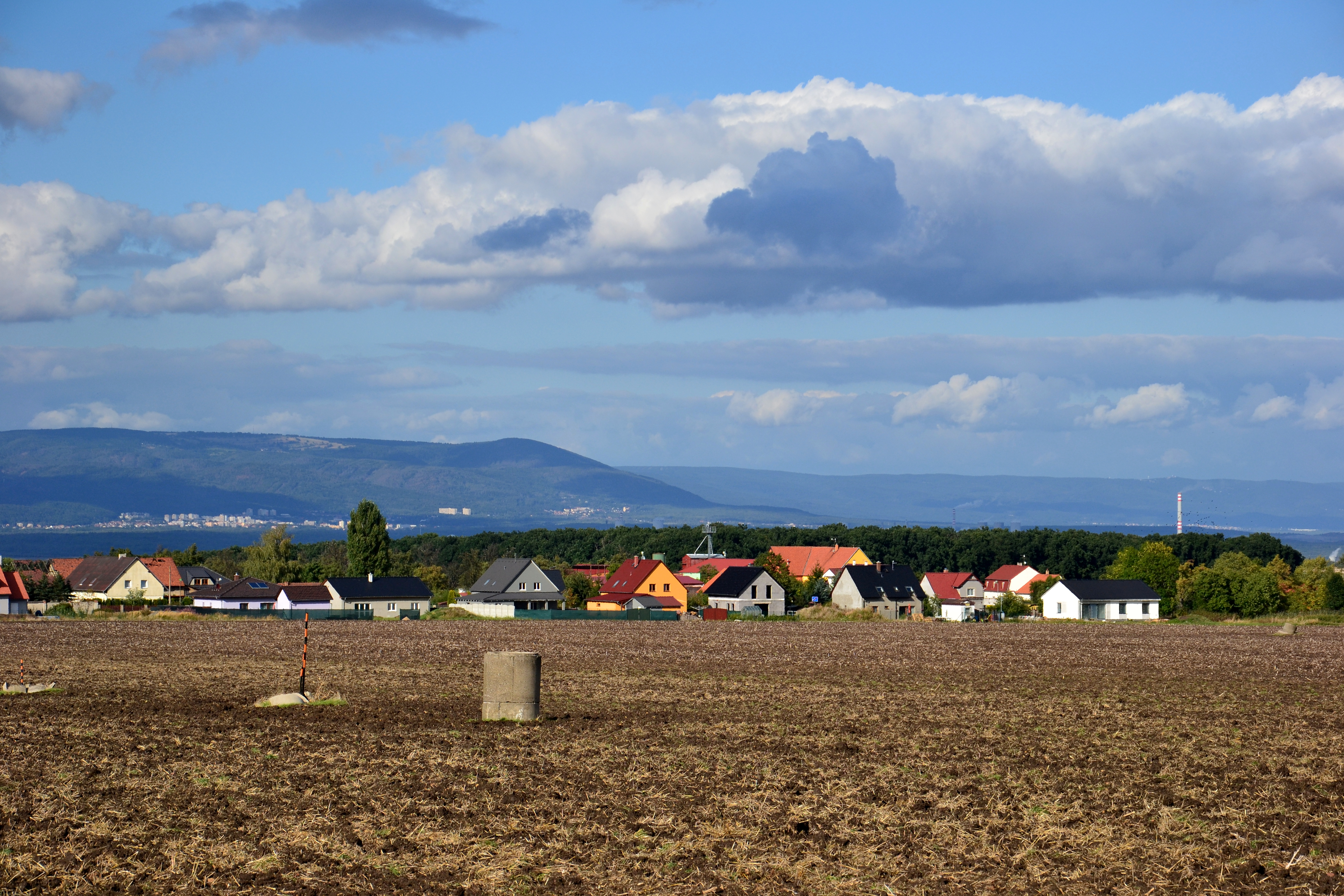
- View from the southwest

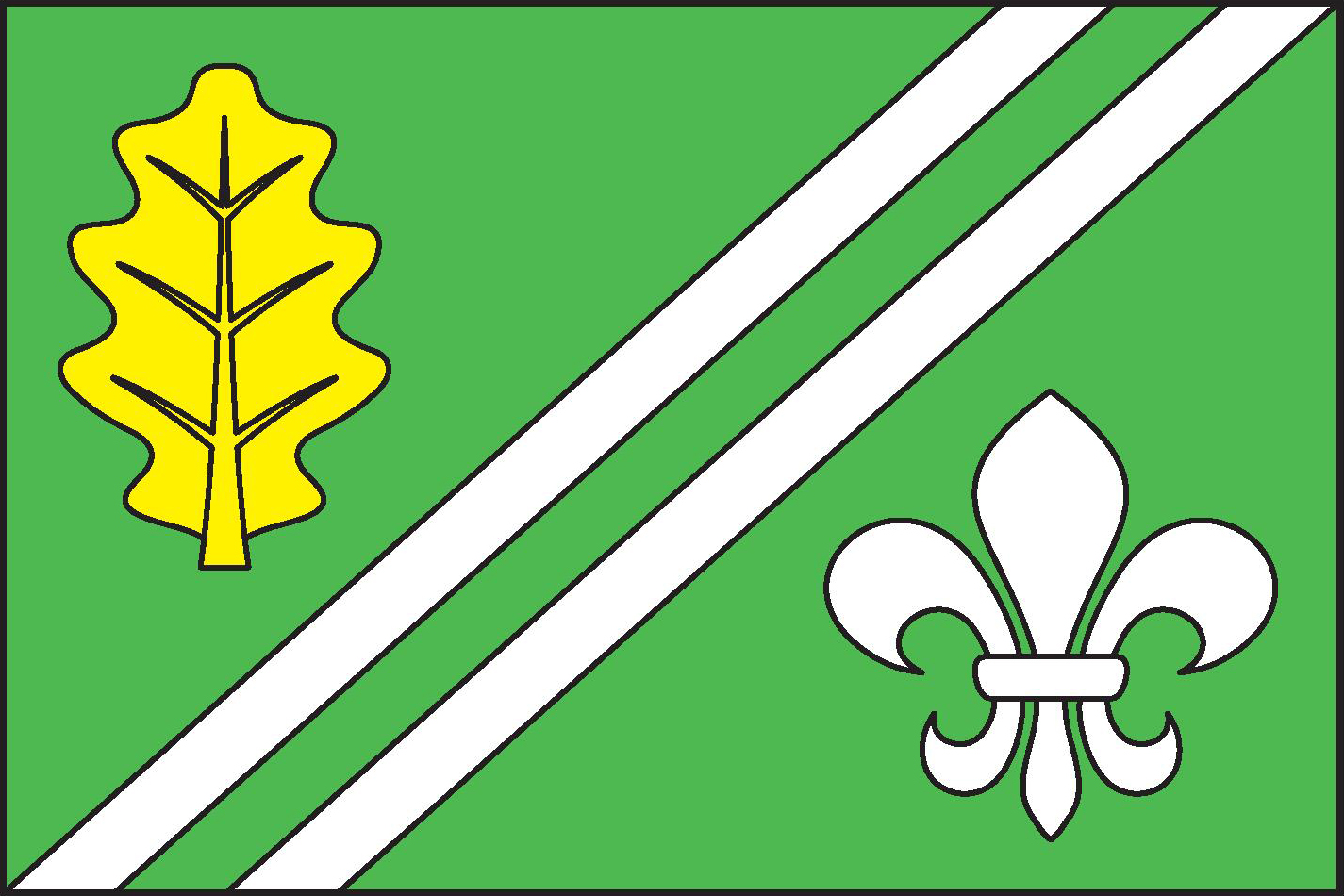
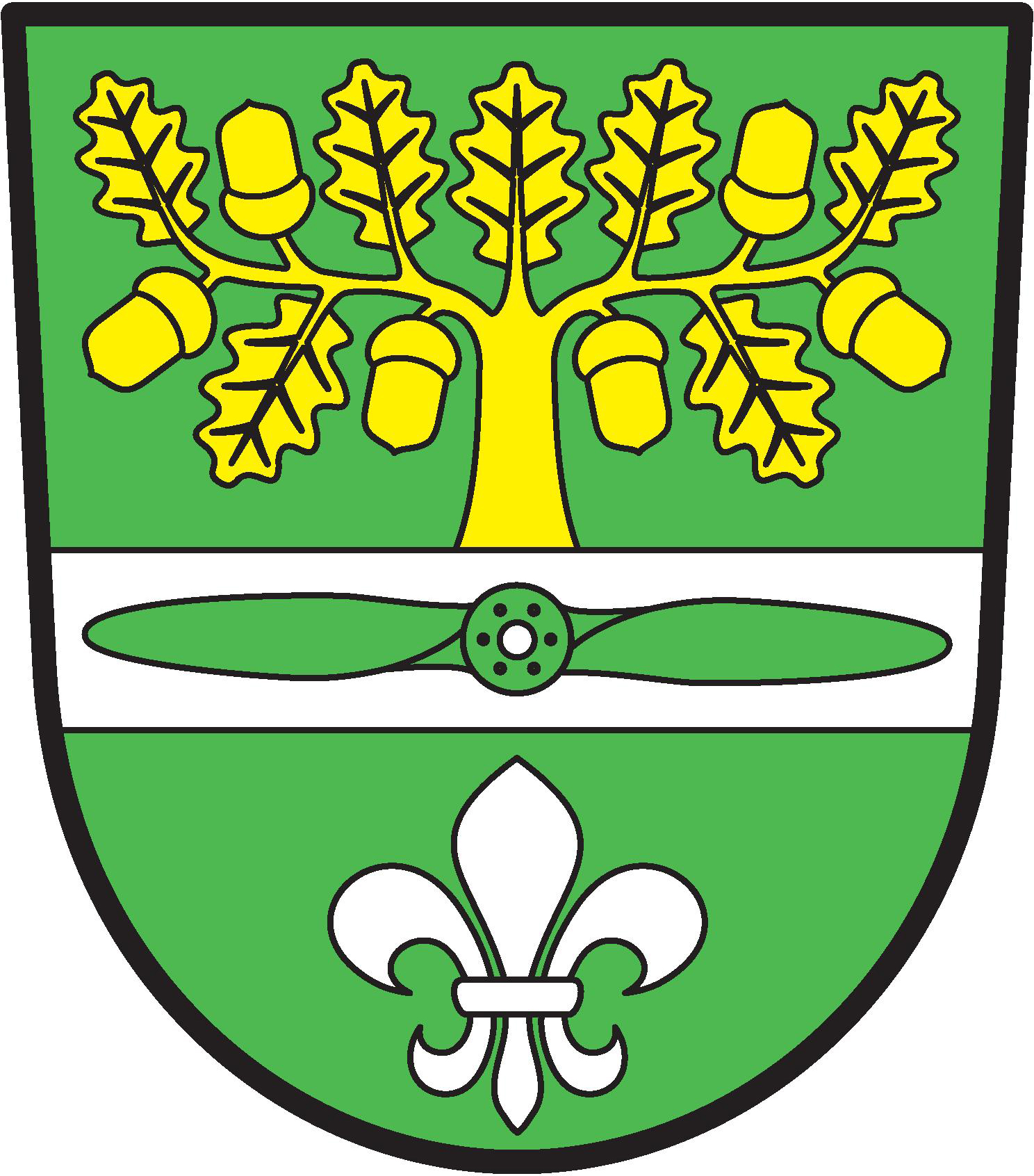
- Flag Coat of arms

- Location in the Czech Republic
- Coordinates: 50°27′48″N 13°29′6″E
- Country: Czech Republic
- Region: Ústí nad Labem
- District: Chomutov
- First mentioned: 1290

Area
  - Total: 3.84 km^{2} (1.48 sq mi)
- Elevation: 337 m (1,106 ft)

Population (2026-01-01)
  - Total: 201
  - Density: 52.3/km^{2} (136/sq mi)
- Time zone: UTC+1 (CET)
  - Summer (DST): UTC+2 (CEST)
- Postal code: 431 11
- Website: www.pesvice.cz

Pesvice is a municipality and village in Chomutov District in the Ústí nad Labem Region of the Czech Republic. It has about 200 inhabitants.

Pesvice lies approximately 6 kilometres (4 mi) east of Chomutov, 45 km (28 mi) south-west of Ústí nad Labem, and 80 km (50 mi) north-west of Prague.

== Demographics ==
Historical population
Year	Pop.	±%
1869	223	—
1880	255	+14.3%
1890	286	+12.2%
1900	271	−5.2%
1910	313	+15.5%
1921	364	+16.3%
1930	374	+2.7%
1950	220	−41.2%
1961	176	−20.0%
1970	145	−17.6%
1980	105	−27.6%
1991	92	−12.4%
2001	104	+13.0%
2011	121	+16.3%
2021	189	+56.2%
Source: Censuses
