= Veliká Ves (Chomutov District) =

- Municipality
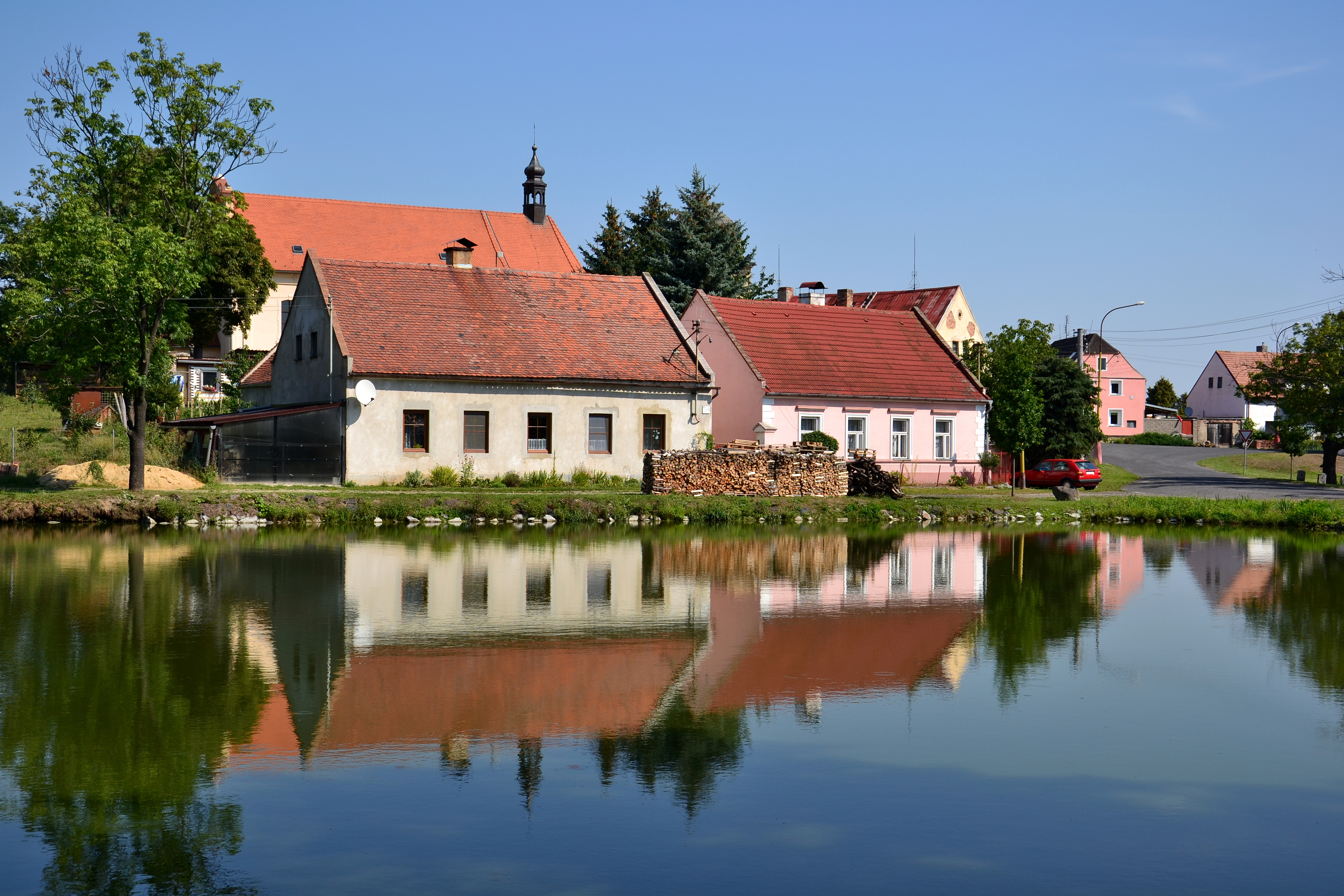
- View towards the centre of Veliká Ves

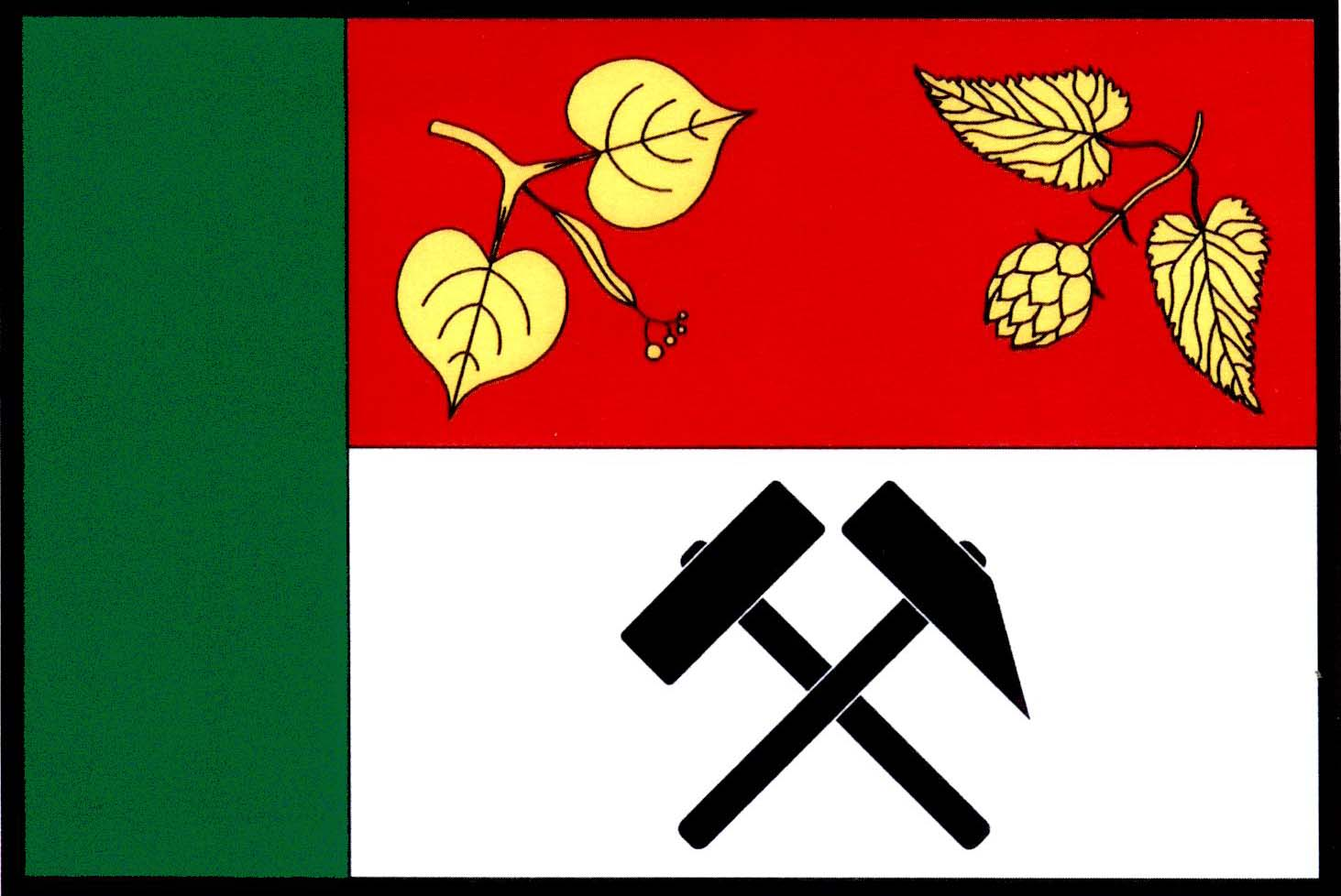
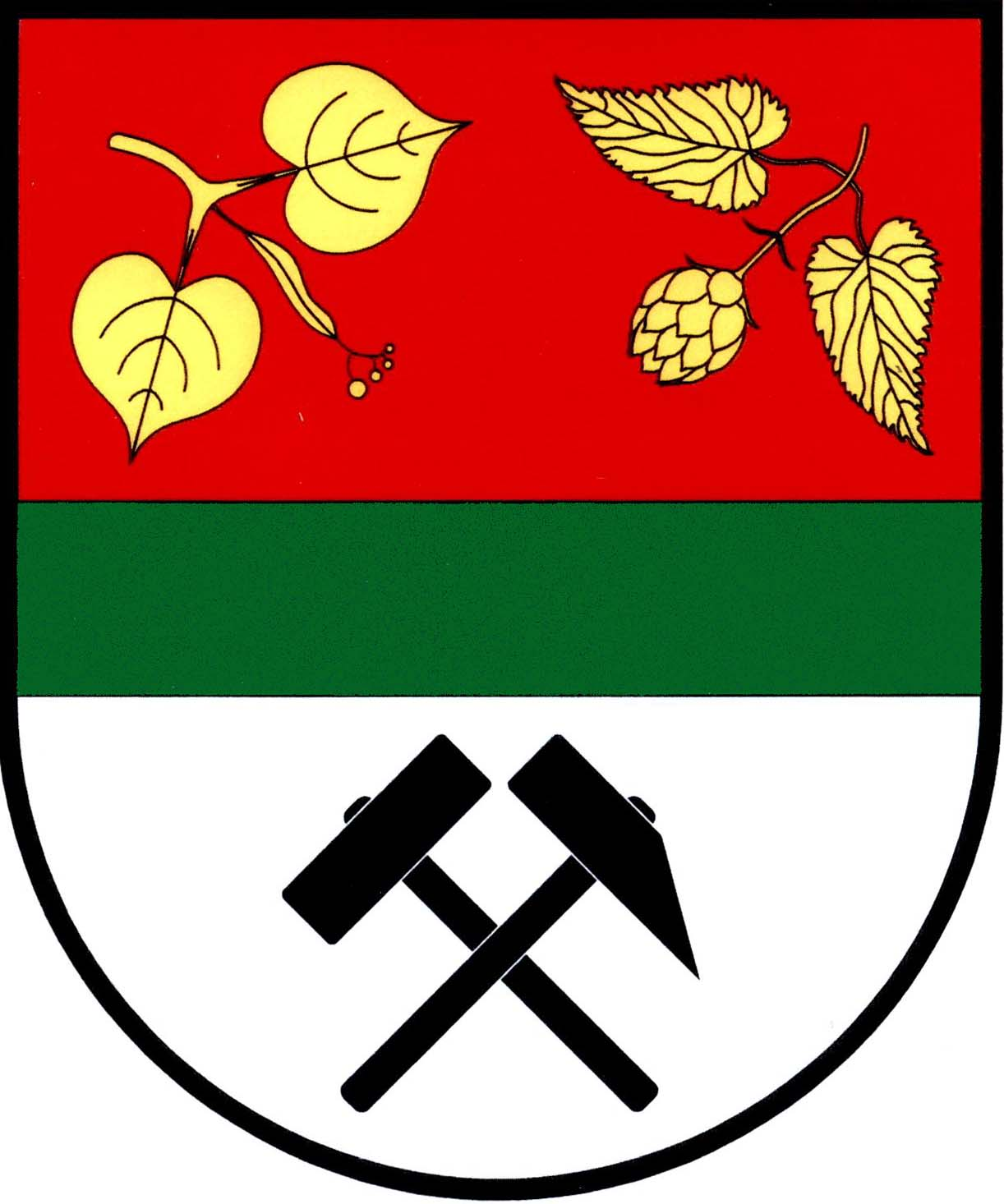
- Flag Coat of arms

- Location in the Czech Republic
- Coordinates: 50°16′11″N 13°22′29″E
- Country: Czech Republic
- Region: Ústí nad Labem
- District: Chomutov
- First mentioned: 1352

Area
  - Total: 17.81 km^{2} (6.88 sq mi)
- Elevation: 275 m (902 ft)

Population (2026-01-01)
  - Total: 328
  - Density: 18.4/km^{2} (47.7/sq mi)
- Time zone: UTC+1 (CET)
  - Summer (DST): UTC+2 (CEST)
- Postal code: 441 01
- Website: www.velikaves.cz

Veliká Ves (German: Michelsdorf) is a municipality and village in Chomutov District in the Ústí nad Labem Region of the Czech Republic. It has about 300 inhabitants.

Veliká Ves lies approximately 22 kilometres (14 mi) south of Chomutov, 65 km (40 mi) south-west of Ústí nad Labem, and 78 km (48 mi) west of Prague.

== Administrative division ==
Veliká Ves consists of five municipal parts (in brackets population according to the 2021 census):

- Veliká Ves (56)
- Nové Třebčice (26)
- Podlesice (96)
- Široké Třebčice (92)
- Vitčice (44)

== Demographics ==
Historical population
Year	Pop.	±%
1869	1,749	—
1880	1,796	+2.7%
1890	1,744	−2.9%
1900	1,656	−5.0%
1910	1,568	−5.3%
1921	1,613	+2.9%
1930	1,458	−9.6%
1950	520	−64.3%
1961	528	+1.5%
1970	460	−12.9%
1980	397	−13.7%
1991	274	−31.0%
2001	268	−2.2%
2011	288	+7.5%
2021	314	+9.0%
Source: Censuses
