= Chbany =

- Municipality
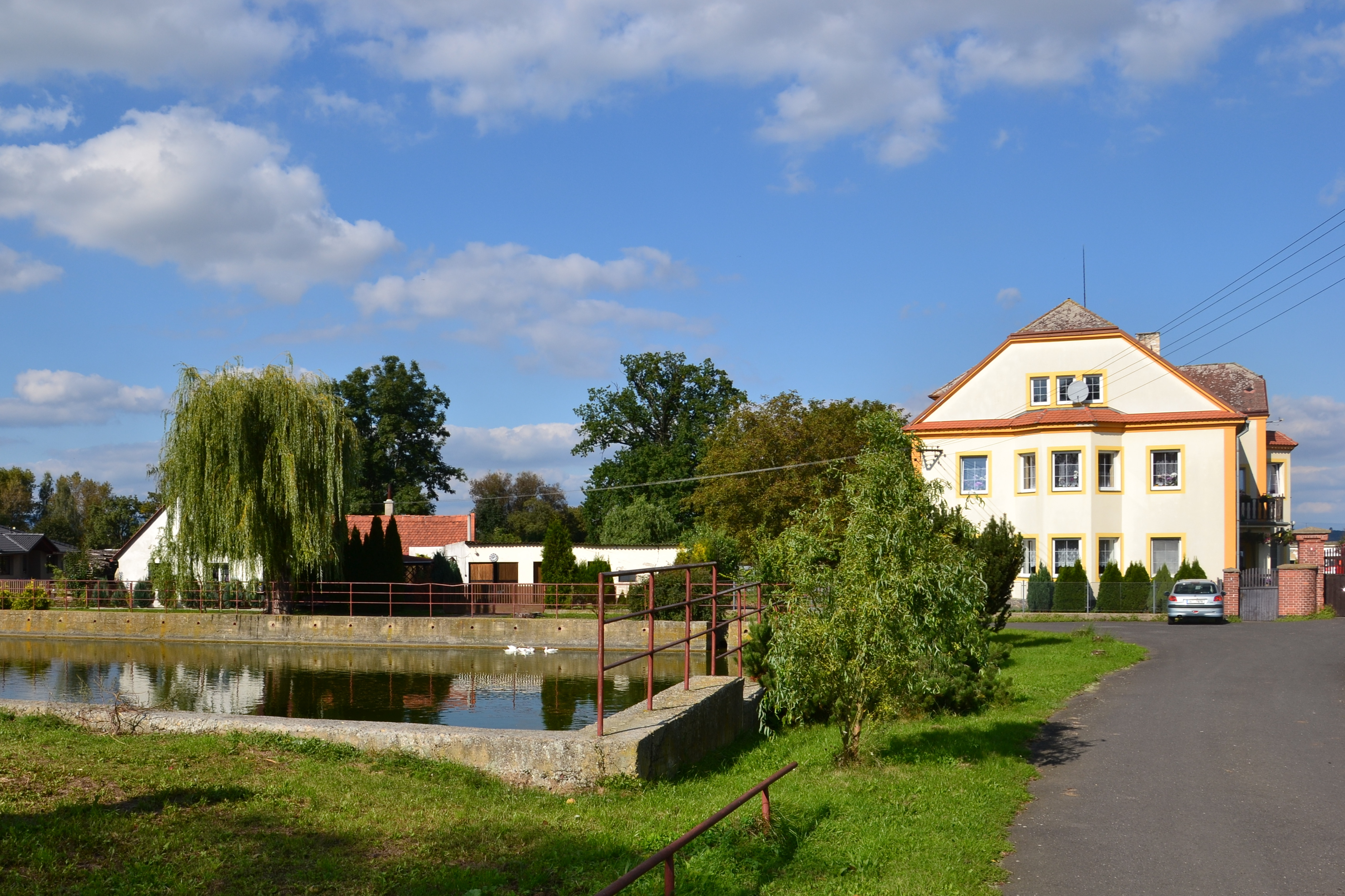
- Centre of Chbany

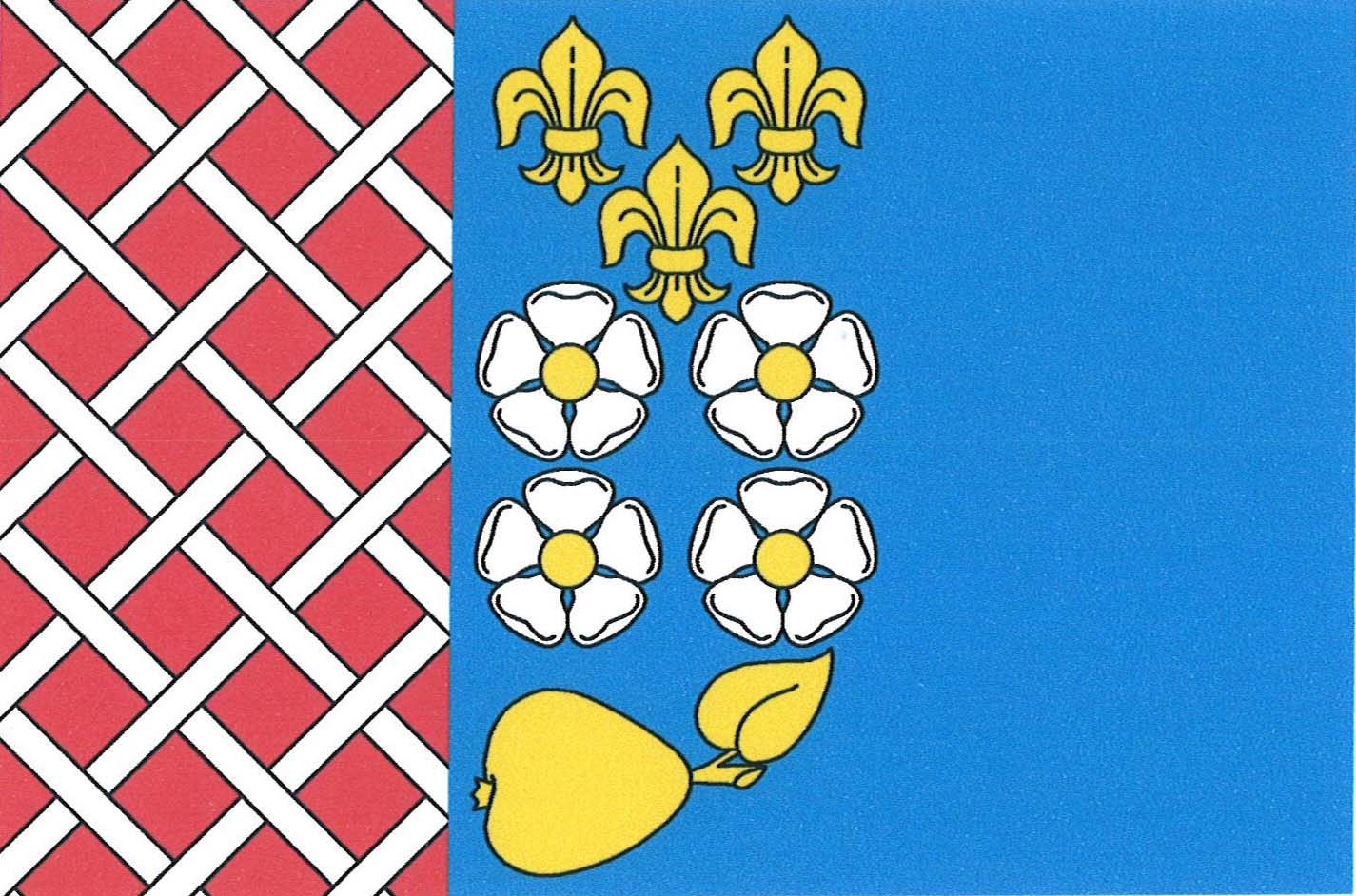
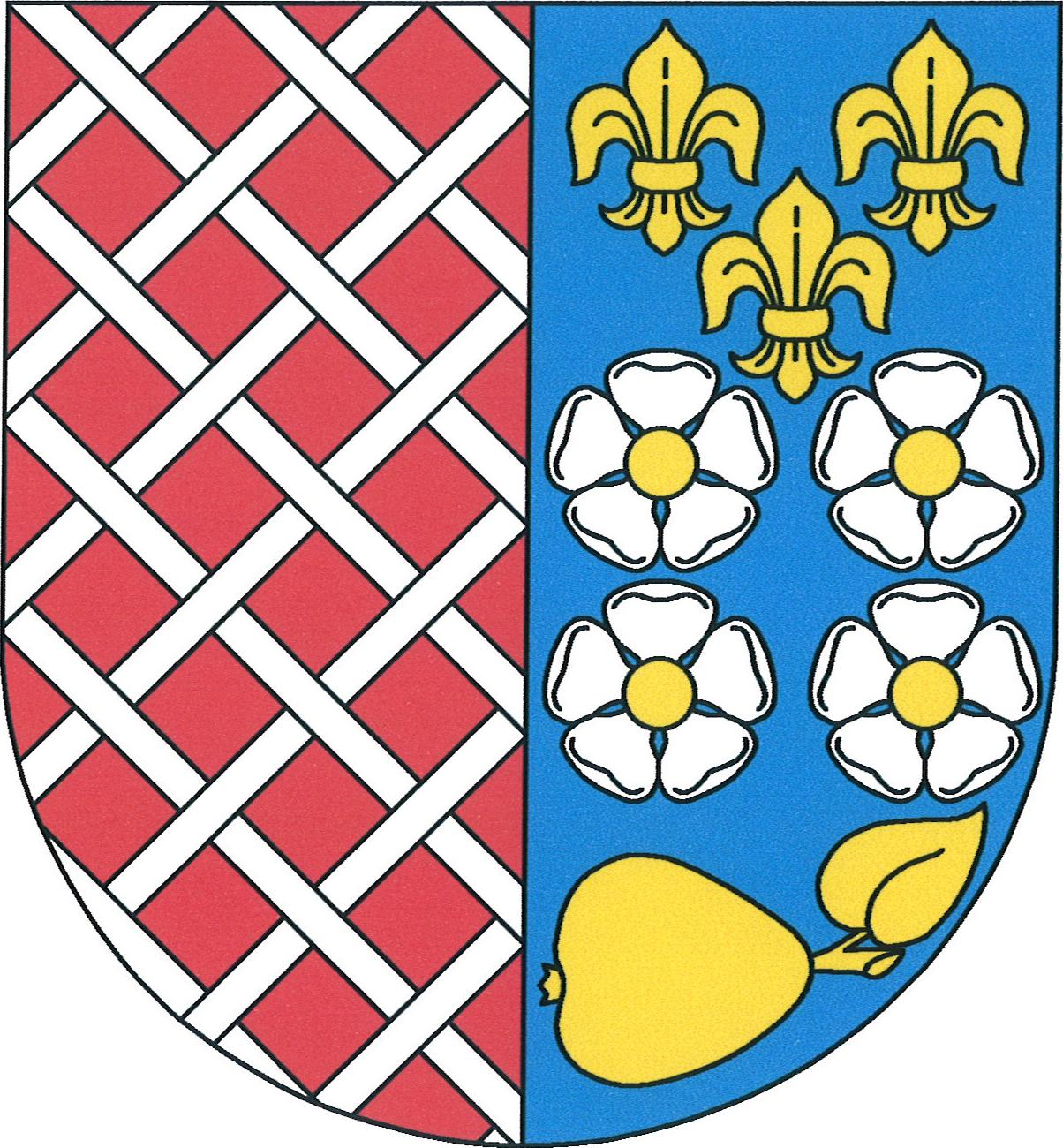
- Flag Coat of arms

- Location in the Czech Republic
- Coordinates: 50°19′58″N 13°25′50″E
- Country: Czech Republic
- Region: Ústí nad Labem
- District: Chomutov
- First mentioned: 1422

Area
  - Total: 27.88 km^{2} (10.76 sq mi)
- Elevation: 283 m (928 ft)

Population (2026-01-01)
  - Total: 650
  - Density: 23/km^{2} (60/sq mi)
- Time zone: UTC+1 (CET)
  - Summer (DST): UTC+2 (CEST)
- Postal codes: 431 57, 438 01
- Website: www.chbany.cz

Chbany (German: Kwon) is a municipality and village in Chomutov District in the Ústí nad Labem Region of the Czech Republic. It has about 700 inhabitants.

Chbany lies approximately 15 kilometres (9 mi) south of Chomutov, 56 km (35 mi) south-west of Ústí nad Labem, and 76 km (47 mi) west of Prague.

== Administrative division ==
Chbany consists of nine municipal parts (in brackets population according to the 2021 census):

- Chbany (280)
- Hořenice (8)
- Malé Krhovice (13)
- Poláky (152)
- Přeskaky (18)
- Roztyly (7)
- Soběsuky (14)
- Vadkovice (79)
- Vikletice (23)

== History ==
The first written mention of Chbany is from 1422.

== Demographics ==
Historical population
| Year | Pop. | ±% |
|---|---|---|
| 1869 | 1,435 | — |
| 1880 | 1,456 | +1.5% |
| 1890 | 1,514 | +4.0% |
| 1900 | 1,502 | −0.8% |
| 1910 | 1,381 | −8.1% |
| 1921 | 1,540 | +11.5% |
| 1930 | 1,547 | +0.5% |
| 1950 | 754 | −51.3% |
| 1961 | 608 | −19.4% |
| 1970 | 572 | −5.9% |
| 1980 | 633 | +10.7% |
| 1991 | 583 | −7.9% |
| 2001 | 599 | +2.7% |
| 2011 | 571 | −4.7% |
| 2021 | 594 | +4.0% |
Source: Censuses
