= Okounov =

- Municipality
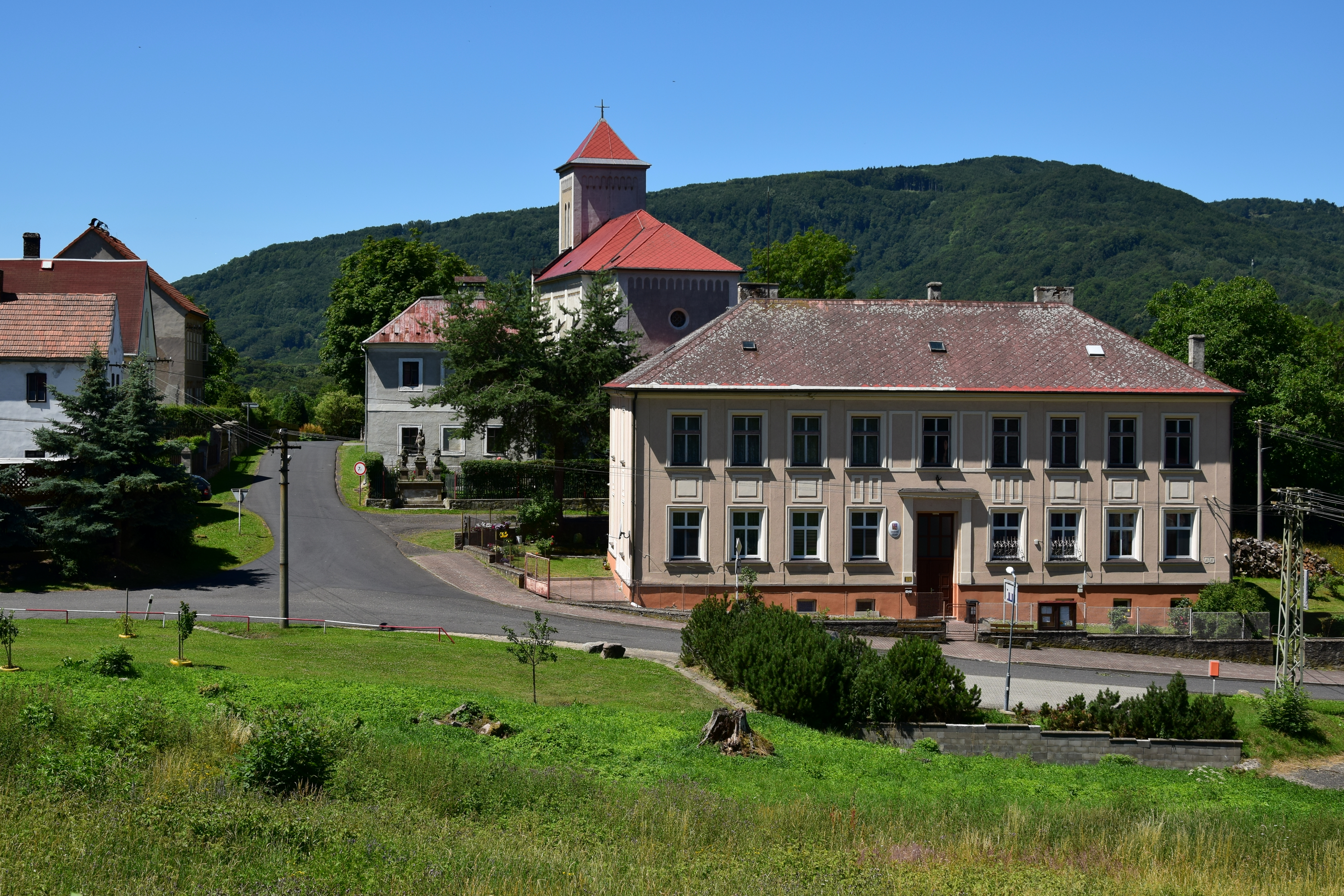
- Municipal office and Church of Saint Lawrence

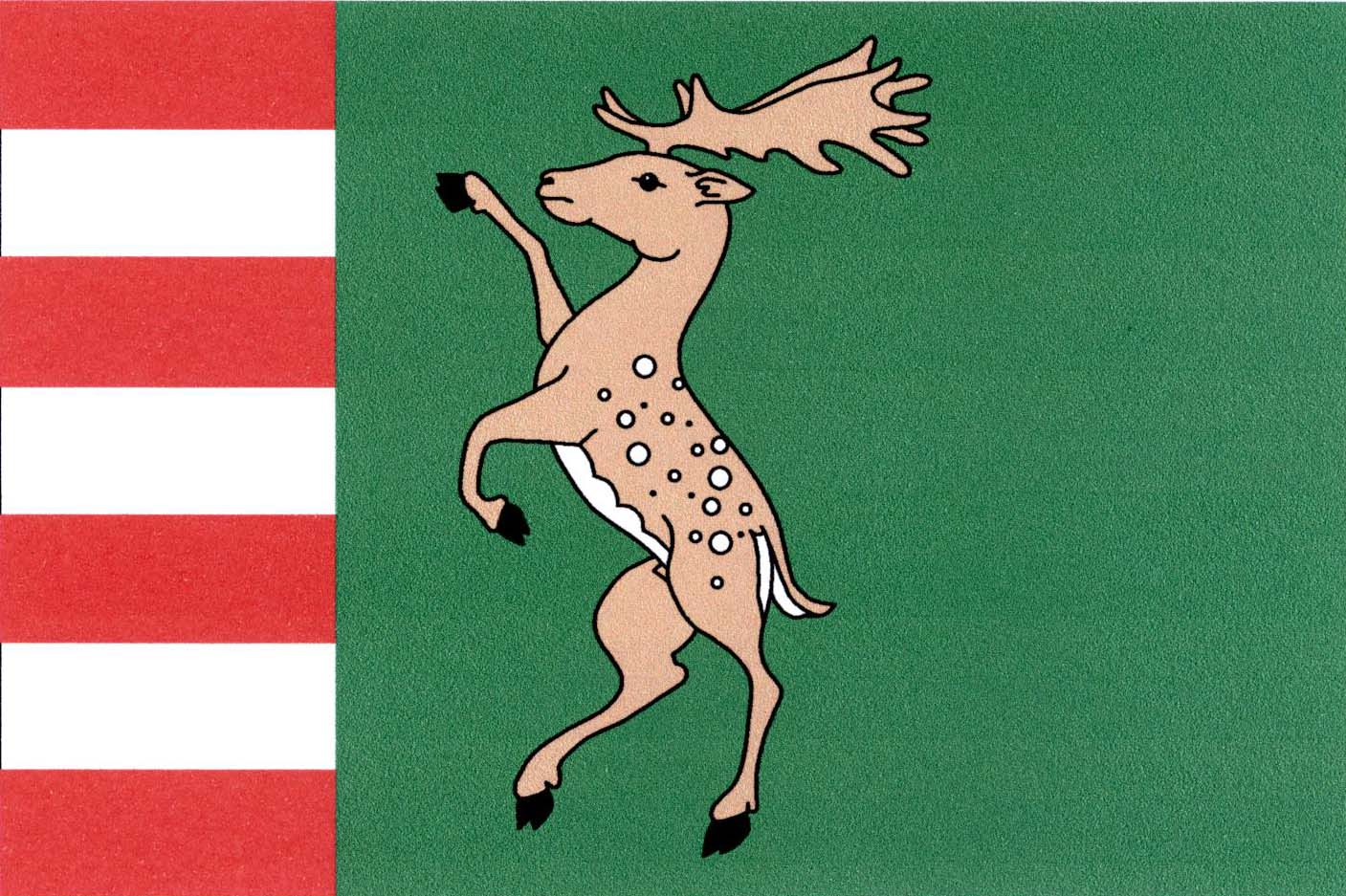
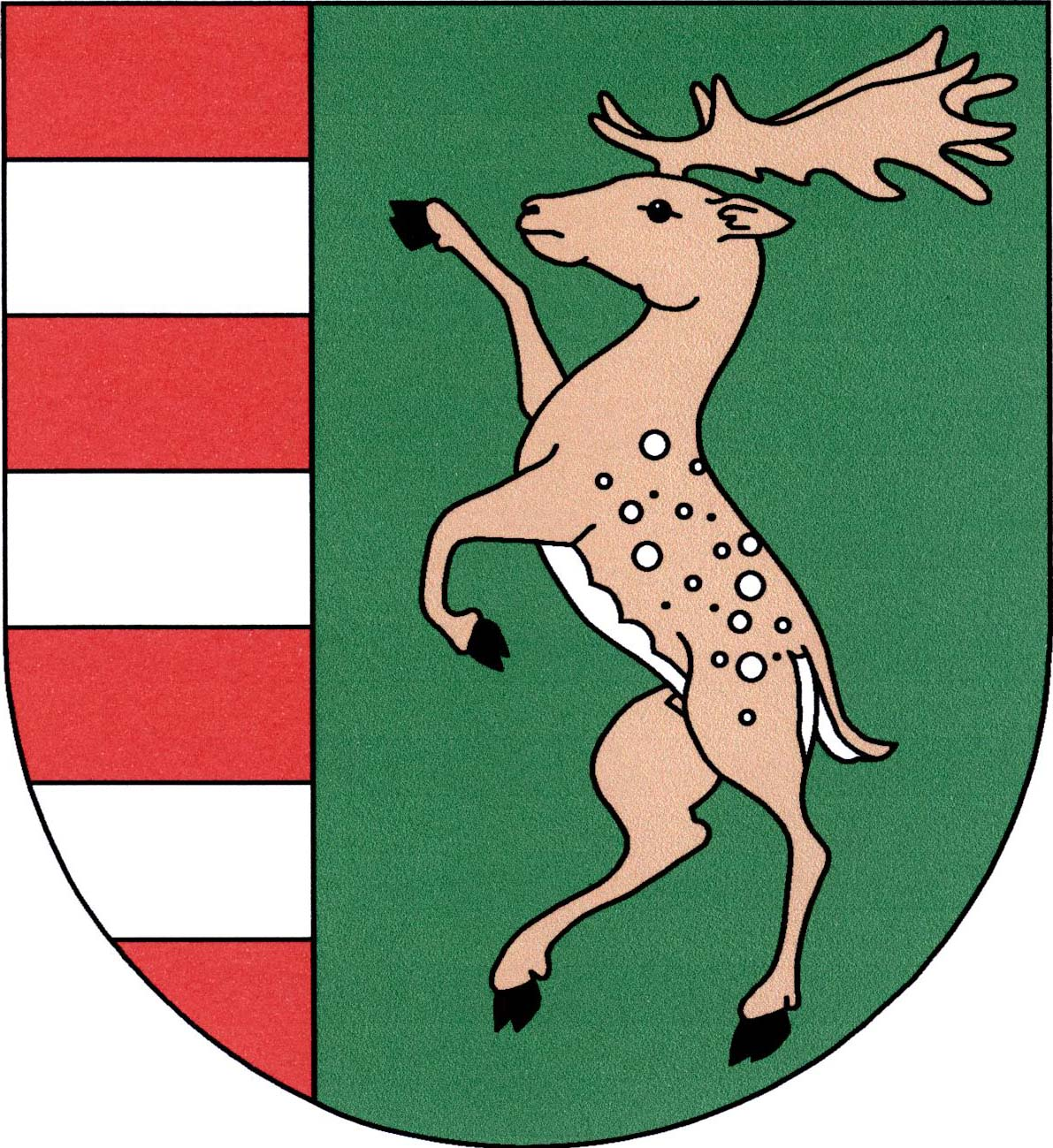
- Flag Coat of arms

- Location in the Czech Republic
- Coordinates: 50°21′44″N 13°6′24″E
- Country: Czech Republic
- Region: Ústí nad Labem
- District: Chomutov
- First mentioned: 1358

Area
  - Total: 8.32 km^{2} (3.21 sq mi)
- Elevation: 395 m (1,296 ft)

Population (2026-01-01)
  - Total: 437
  - Density: 52.5/km^{2} (136/sq mi)
- Time zone: UTC+1 (CET)
  - Summer (DST): UTC+2 (CEST)
- Postal code: 431 51
- Website: www.okounov.cz

Okounov (German: Okenau) is a municipality and village in Chomutov District in the Ústí nad Labem Region of the Czech Republic. It has about 400 inhabitants.

Okounov lies approximately 24 kilometres (15 mi) south-west of Chomutov, 74 km (46 mi) south-west of Ústí nad Labem, and 99 km (62 mi) west of Prague.

== Administrative division ==
Okounov consists of four municipal parts (in brackets population according to the 2021 census):

- Okounov (221)
- Kotvina (146)
- Krupice (3)
- Oslovice (27)

== Demographics ==
Historical population
Year	Pop.	±%
1869	839	—
1880	877	+4.5%
1890	882	+0.6%
1900	890	+0.9%
1910	854	−4.0%
1921	918	+7.5%
1930	1,008	+9.8%
1950	461	−54.3%
1961	479	+3.9%
1970	415	−13.4%
1980	335	−19.3%
1991	228	−31.9%
2001	262	+14.9%
2011	303	+15.6%
2021	397	+31.0%
Source: Censuses
