= Domašín =

- Municipality
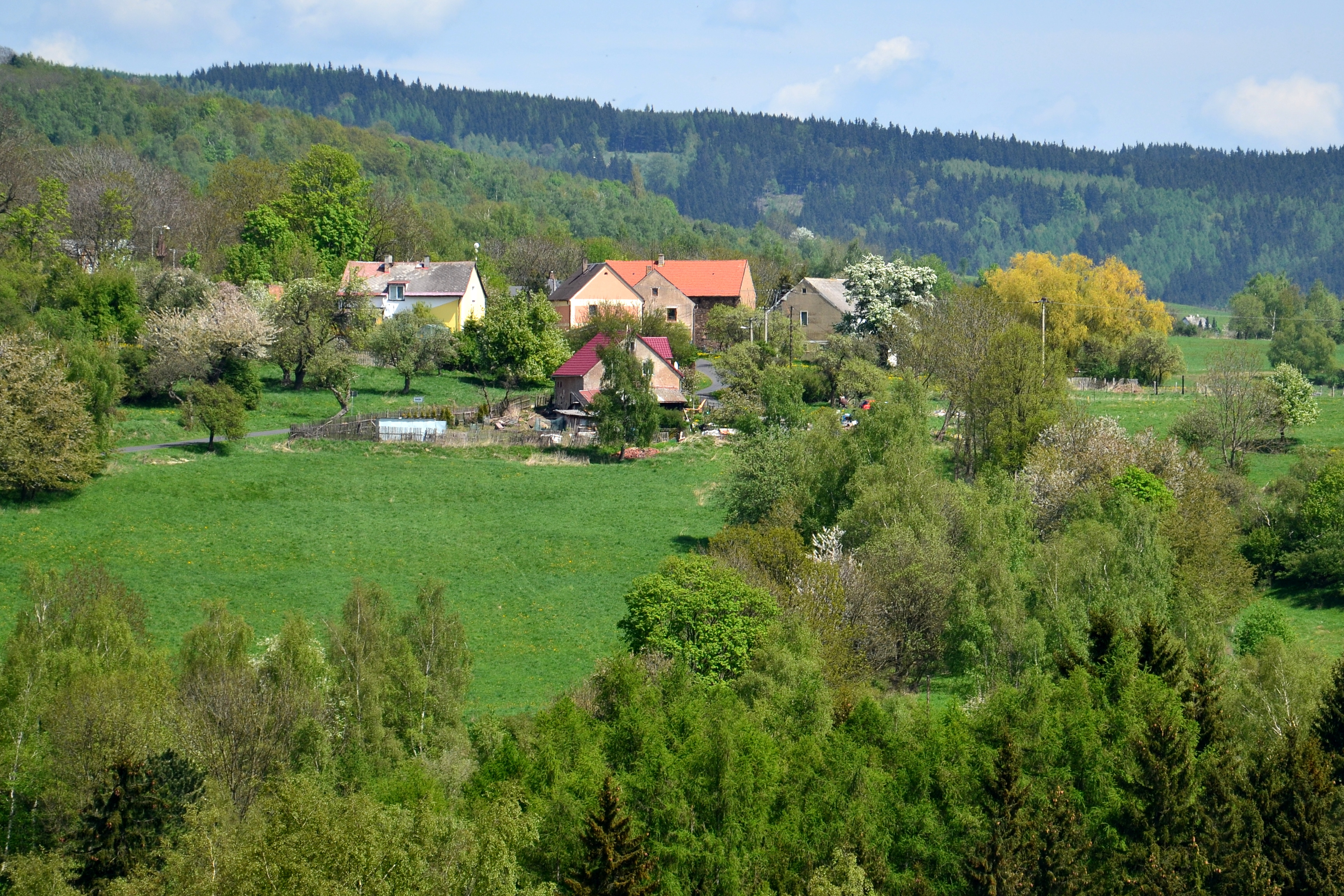
- View from the southwest

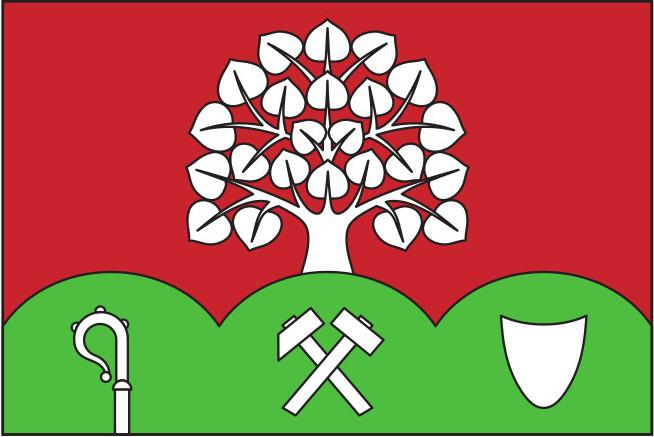
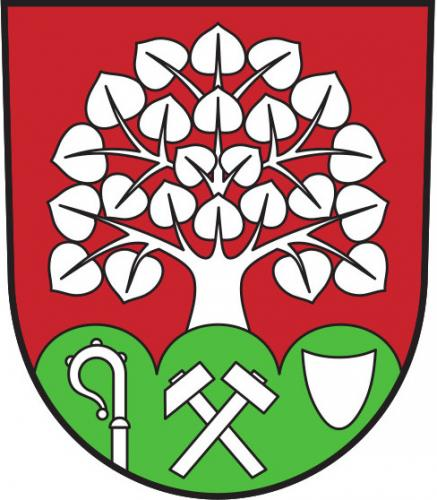
- Flag Coat of arms

- Location in the Czech Republic
- Coordinates: 50°25′15″N 13°10′20″E
- Country: Czech Republic
- Region: Ústí nad Labem
- District: Chomutov
- First mentioned: 1431

Area
  - Total: 15.80 km^{2} (6.10 sq mi)
- Elevation: 568 m (1,864 ft)

Population (2026-01-01)
  - Total: 194
  - Density: 12.3/km^{2} (31.8/sq mi)
- Time zone: UTC+1 (CET)
  - Summer (DST): UTC+2 (CEST)
- Postal code: 431 51
- Website: www.obec-domasin.cz

Domašín (German: Tomitschan) is a municipality and village in Chomutov District in the Ústí nad Labem Region of the Czech Republic. It has about 200 inhabitants.

Domašín lies approximately 17 kilometres (11 mi) west of Chomutov, 67 km (42 mi) west of Ústí nad Labem, and 97 km (60 mi) north-west of Prague.

== Administrative division ==
Domašín consists of four municipal parts (in brackets population according to the 2021 census):

- Domašín (18)
- Louchov (49)
- Nová Víska (8)
- Petlery (98)

== Demographics ==
Historical population
Year	Pop.	±%
1869	1,270	—
1880	1,320	+3.9%
1890	1,276	−3.3%
1900	1,268	−0.6%
1910	1,299	+2.4%
1921	1,217	−6.3%
1930	1,107	−9.0%
1950	211	−80.9%
1961	235	+11.4%
1970	224	−4.7%
1980	185	−17.4%
1991	120	−35.1%
2001	153	+27.5%
2011	186	+21.6%
2021	173	−7.0%
Source: Censuses
