= Chomutov District =

Chomutov District Okres Chomutov
- District
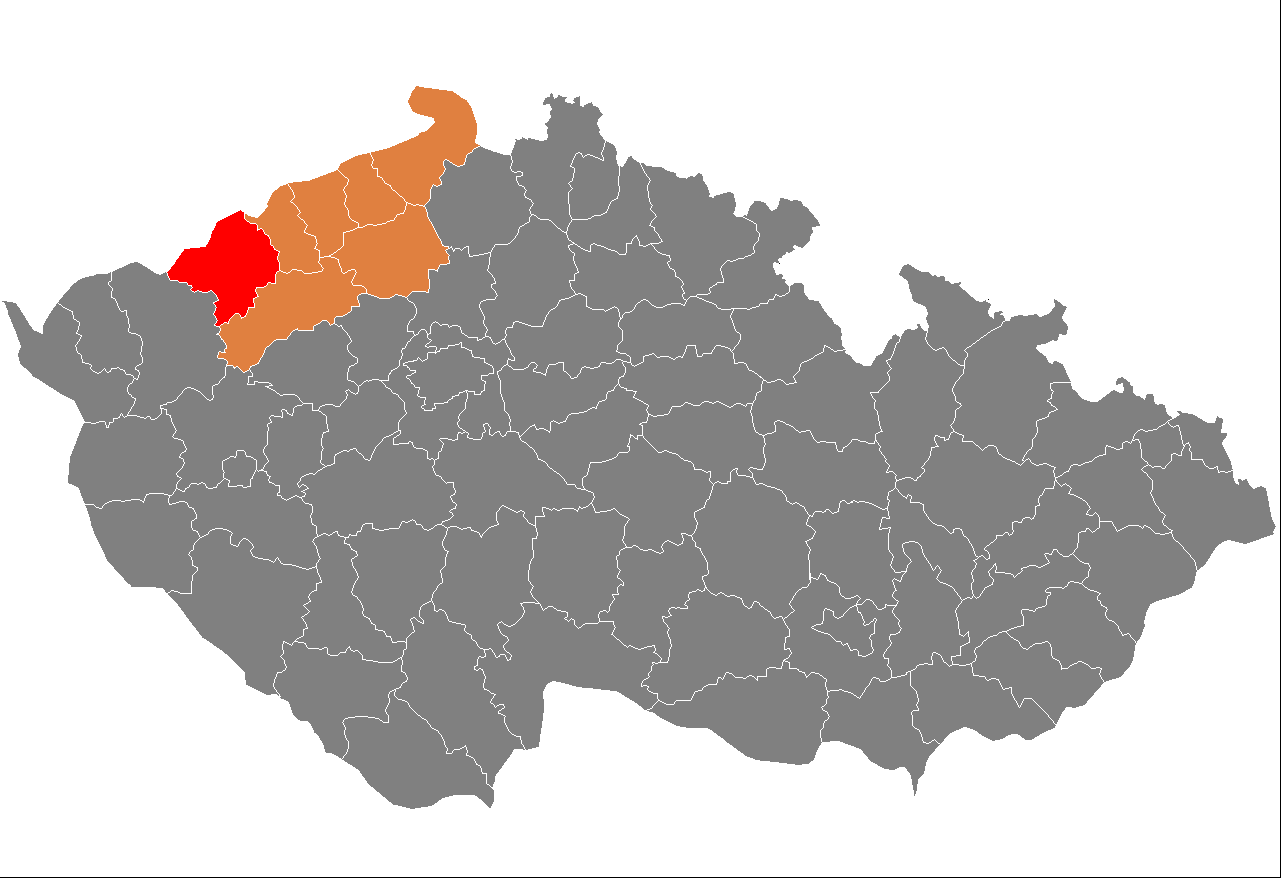
- Location in the Ústí nad Labem Region within the Czech Republic

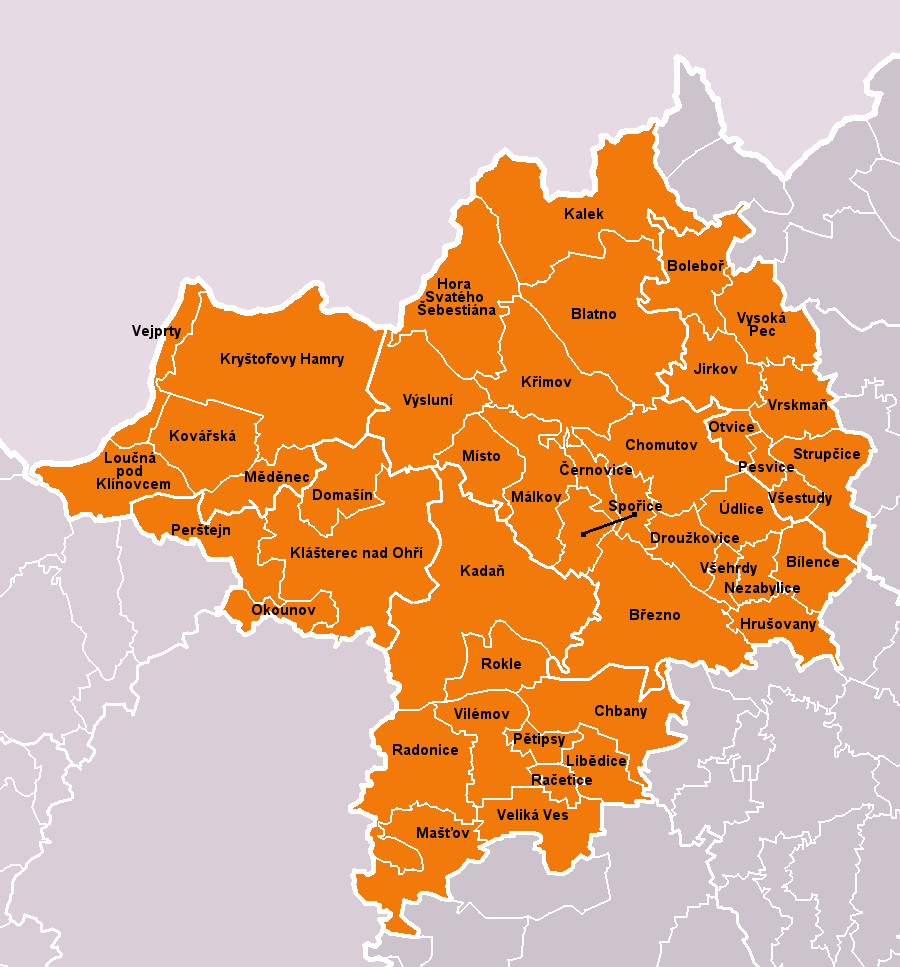
- Coordinates: 50°26′N 13°18′E
- Country: Czech Republic
- Region: Ústí nad Labem
- Capital: Chomutov

Area
  - Total: 935.70 km^{2} (361.28 sq mi)

Population (2026)
  - Total: 123,049
  - Density: 131.50/km^{2} (340.60/sq mi)
- Time zone: UTC+1 (CET)
  - Summer (DST): UTC+2 (CEST)
- Municipalities: 44
- * Cities and towns: 8
- * Market towns: 1

Chomutov District (Czech: okres Chomutov) is a district in the Ústí nad Labem Region of the Czech Republic. Its capital is the city of Chomutov.

== Administrative division ==
Chomutov District is divided into two administrative districts of municipalities with extended competence: Chomutov and Kadaň.

=== List of municipalities ===
Cities and towns are marked in bold and market towns in italics:

Bílence - Blatno - Boleboř - Březno - Černovice - Chbany - Chomutov - Domašín - Droužkovice - Hora Svatého Šebestiána - Hrušovany - Jirkov - Kadaň - Kalek - Klášterec nad Ohří - Kovářská - Křimov - Kryštofovy Hamry - Libědice - Loučná pod Klínovcem - Málkov - Mašťov - Měděnec - Místo - Nezabylice - Okounov - Otvice - Perštejn - Pesvice - Pětipsy - Račetice - Radonice - Rokle - Spořice - Strupčice - Údlice - Vejprty - Veliká Ves - Vilémov - Vrskmaň - Všehrdy - Všestudy - Výsluní - Vysoká Pec

== Geography ==
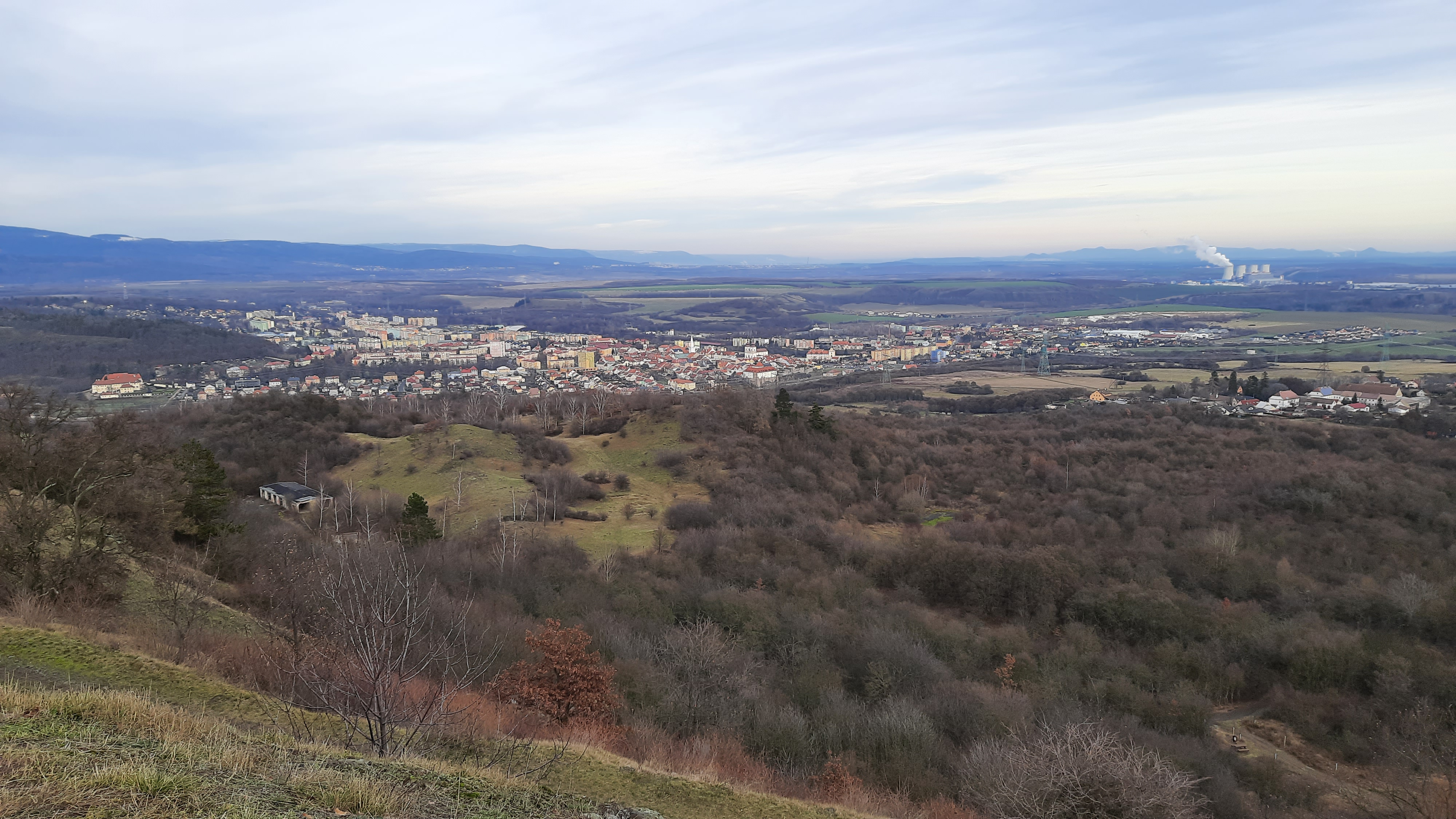
Landscape around Kadaň

Chomutov District borders Germany in the north. The district consists of two distinct parts, the forested and mountainous landscape in the northwest and the flat, mainly agricultural landscape in the southeast. The territory extends into three geomorphological mesoregions: Most Basin (south and east), Ore Mountains (north and west), and Doupov Mountains (small part in the southwest). The highest point of the district and the entire Ústí nad Labem Region is a contour line below the top of the Klínovec Mountain in Loučná pod Klínovcem with an elevation of 1,231 metres (4,039 ft), the highest peak is the nearby Macecha at 1,113 m (3,652 ft). The lowest point is the river bed of the Ohře in Březno at 220 m (720 ft).

From the total district area of 935.7 km^{2} (361.3 sq mi), agricultural land occupies 387.9 km^{2} (149.8 sq mi), forests occupy 360.3 km^{2} (139.1 sq mi), and water area occupies 31.0 km^{2} (12.0 sq mi). Forests cover 38.5% of the district's area.

The most important river is the Ohře, which flows across the southern part of the territory. Notable are the rivers Bílina and Chomutovka that originates here and drain the northern part. The largest bodies of water are the reservoirs Nechranice (the sixth largest reservoir in the country) and Přísečnice. There are also several ponds and the artificial lake Kamencové jezero.

There are no large-scale protected areas.

== Demographics ==
Historical population

Year	Pop.	±%
1869	92,652	—
1880	105,468	+13.8%
1890	114,283	+8.4%
1900	125,444	+9.8%
1910	136,393	+8.7%

Year	Pop.	±%
1921	134,596	−1.3%
1930	147,744	+9.8%
1950	85,715	−42.0%
1961	93,967	+9.6%
1970	103,735	+10.4%

Year	Pop.	±%
1980	118,043	+13.8%
1991	124,081	+5.1%
2001	124,988	+0.7%
2011	122,166	−2.3%
2021	119,240	−2.4%

Source: Censuses

=== Most populous municipalities ===
Name	Population	Area (km^{2})
Chomutov	46,560	29
Jirkov	19,067	17
Kadaň	18,088	66
Klášterec nad Ohří	13,980	54
Vejprty	2,750	10
Spořice	1,550	17
Březno	1,446	46
Údlice	1,325	12
Strupčice	1,194	20
Vysoká Pec	1,188	20

== Economy ==
The largest employers with headquarters in Chomutov District and at least 500 employees are:

Economic entity	Location	Number of employees	Main activity
Severočeské doly	Chomutov	2,500–2,999	Coal mining
Magna Automotive (CZ)	Spořice	1,000–1,499	Manufacture of parts for motor vehicles
Alleima CZ	Chomutov	500–999	Manufacture of metal pipes
Parker Hannifin Industrial	Chomutov	500–999	Manufacture of hydraulic and pneumatic systems
Povodí Ohře	Chomutov	500–999	Water treatment
Kadaň Hospital	Kadaň	500–999	Health care
Donaldson Czech Republic	Klášterec nad Ohří	500–999	Manufacture of filters
HOPI	Klášterec nad Ohří	500–999	Transport and storage
Toyoda Gosei Czech	Klášterec nad Ohří	500–999	Manufacture of parts for motor vehicles
ZF Electronics	Klášterec nad Ohří	500–999	Manufacture of keyboards

== Transport ==
The D7 motorway from Prague leads to Chomutov.

== Sights ==
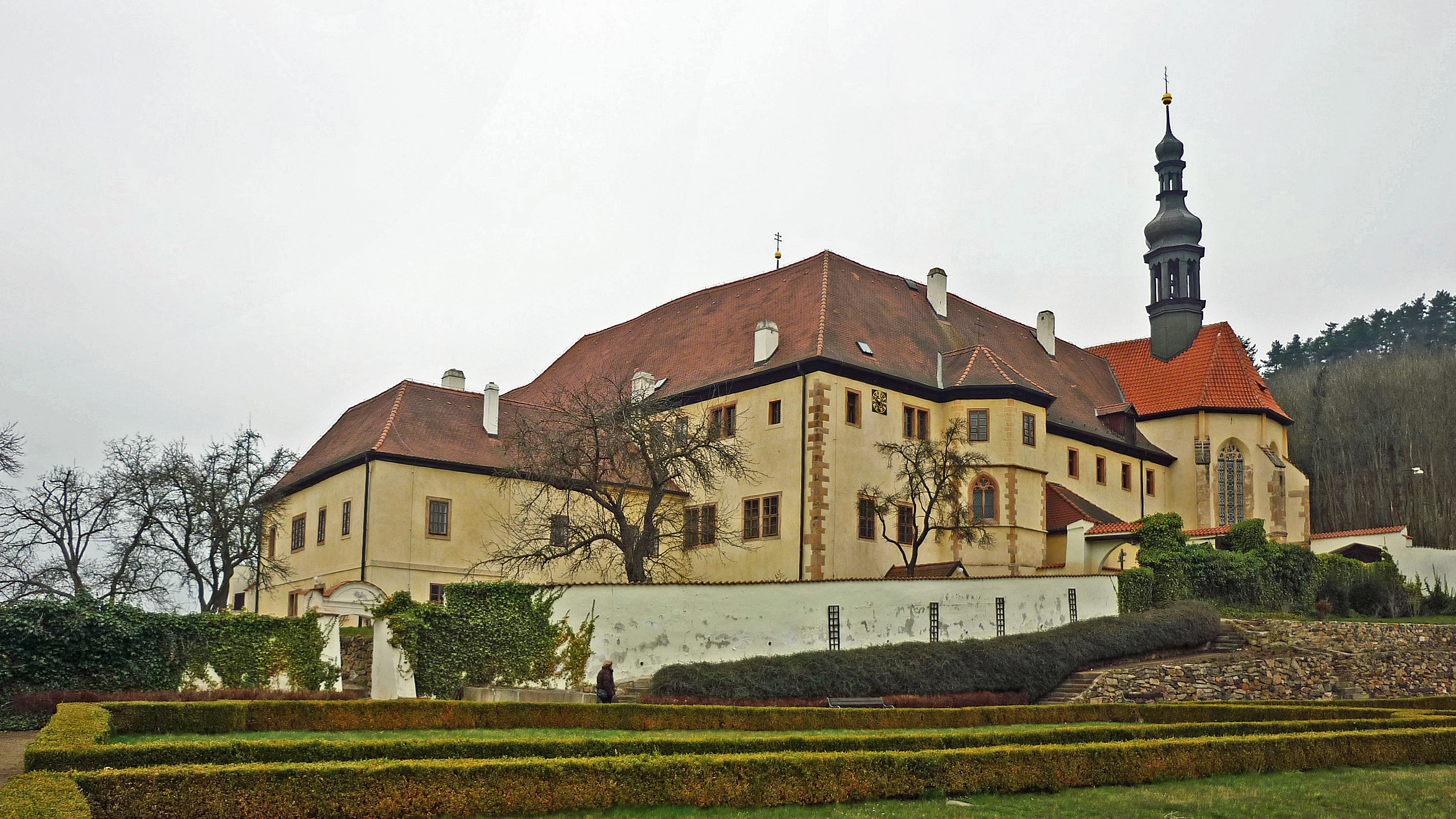
Franciscan monastery in Kadaň

Mědník Hill in Měděnec was designated a UNESCO World Heritage Site in 2019 as part of the transnational Ore Mountain Mining Region.

The most important monuments in the district, protected as national cultural monuments, are:

- Franciscan monastery with the Church of the Fourteen Holy Helpers in Kadaň
- Kadaň Town Hall

The best-preserved settlements and landscapes, protected as monument reservations and monument zones, are:

- Kadaň (monument reservation)
- Chomutov
- Klášterec nad Ohří
- Mašťov
- Mining landscape Háj–Kovářská–Mědník

The most visited tourist destination is the Chomutov Zoo.
