= Otvice =

- Municipality
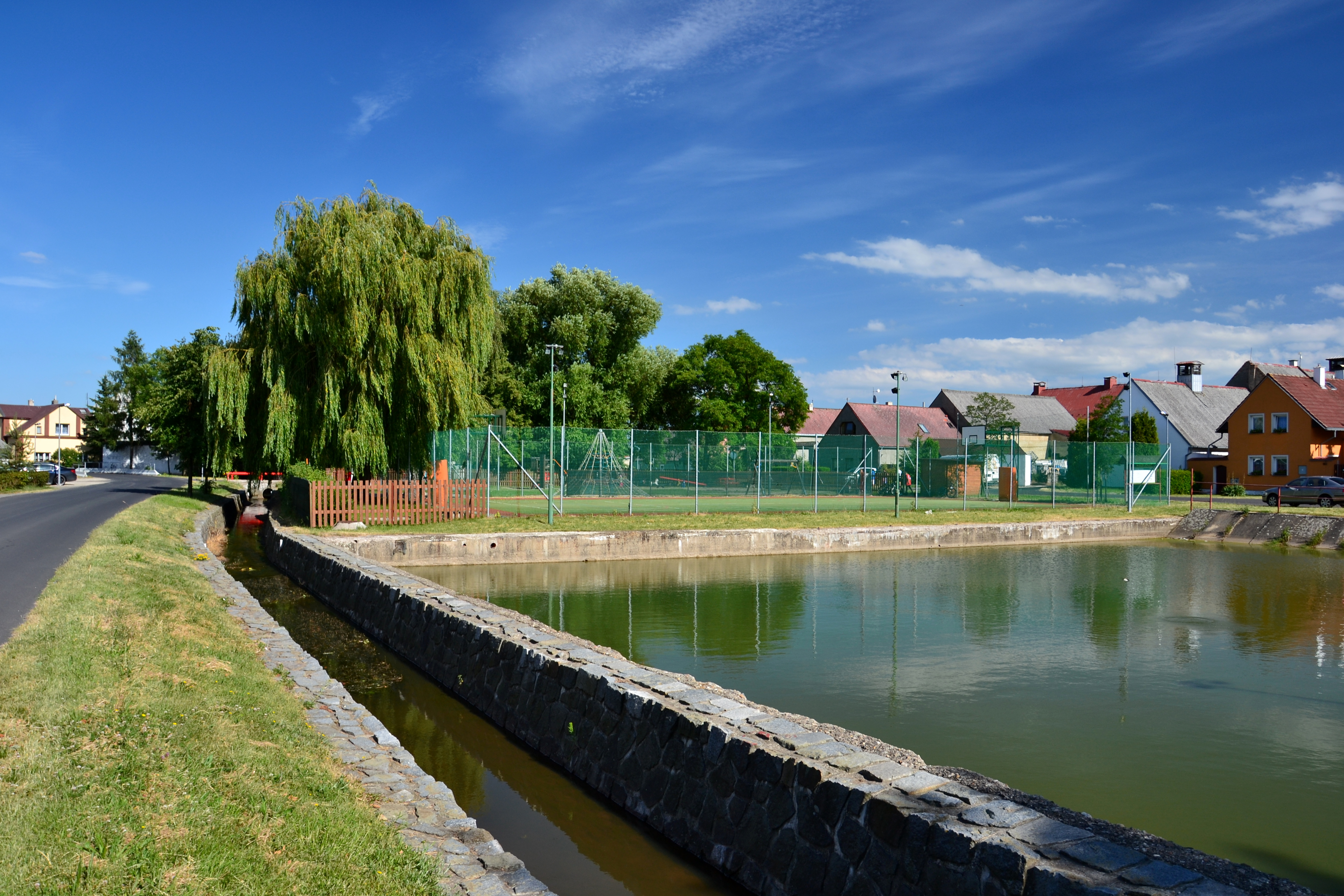
- Centre of Otvice

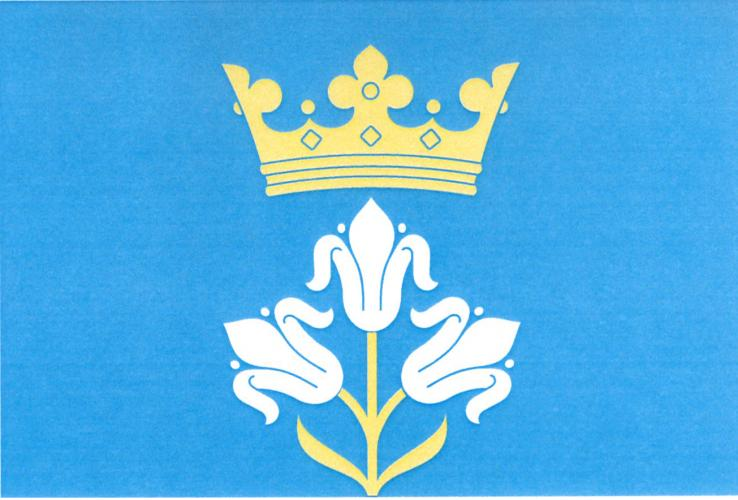
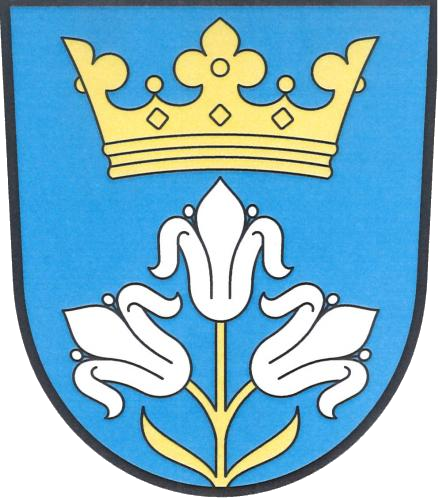
- Flag Coat of arms

- Location in the Czech Republic
- Coordinates: 50°28′51″N 13°27′3″E
- Country: Czech Republic
- Region: Ústí nad Labem
- District: Chomutov
- First mentioned: 1295

Area
  - Total: 5.31 km^{2} (2.05 sq mi)
- Elevation: 323 m (1,060 ft)

Population (2026-01-01)
  - Total: 712
  - Density: 134/km^{2} (347/sq mi)
- Time zone: UTC+1 (CET)
  - Summer (DST): UTC+2 (CEST)
- Postal code: 431 11
- Website: www.otvice.cz

Otvice is a municipality and village in Chomutov District in the Ústí nad Labem Region of the Czech Republic. It has about 700 inhabitants.

Otvice lies approximately 5 kilometres (3 mi) east of Chomutov, 47 km (29 mi) south-west of Ústí nad Labem, and 82 km (51 mi) north-west of Prague.

== Demographics ==
Historical population
Year	Pop.	±%
1869	433	—
1880	570	+31.6%
1890	622	+9.1%
1900	923	+48.4%
1910	1,078	+16.8%
1921	1,154	+7.1%
1930	1,405	+21.8%
1950	839	−40.3%
1961	844	+0.6%
1970	742	−12.1%
1980	592	−20.2%
1991	467	−21.1%
2001	520	+11.3%
2011	602	+15.8%
2021	687	+14.1%
Source: Censuses
