= Nezabylice =

- Municipality
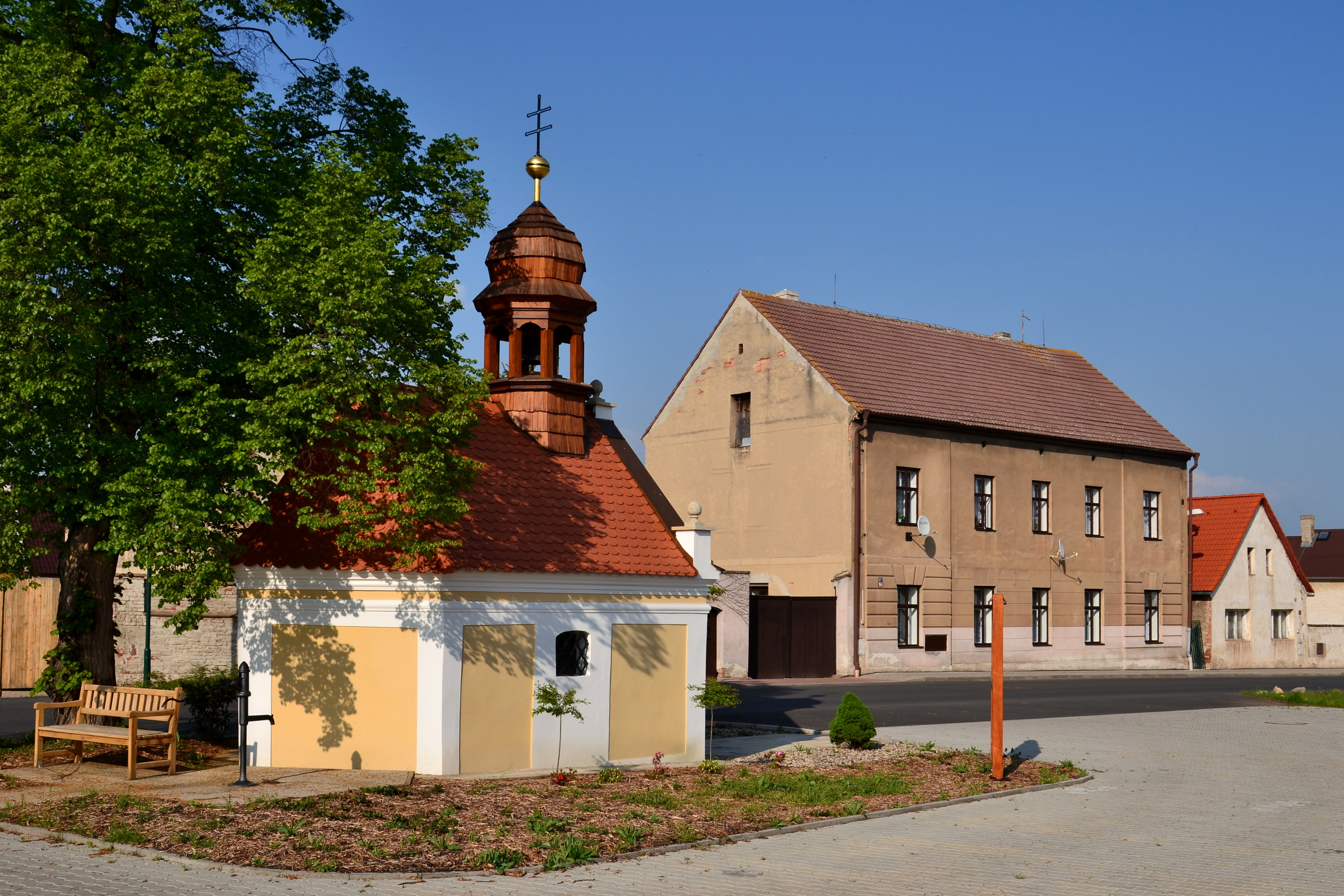
- Hořenec, a part of Nezabylice

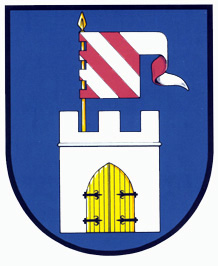
- Flag Coat of arms

- Location in the Czech Republic
- Coordinates: 50°25′27″N 13°28′43″E
- Country: Czech Republic
- Region: Ústí nad Labem
- District: Chomutov
- First mentioned: 1378

Area
  - Total: 6.69 km^{2} (2.58 sq mi)
- Elevation: 270 m (890 ft)

Population (2026-01-01)
  - Total: 289
  - Density: 43.2/km^{2} (112/sq mi)
- Time zone: UTC+1 (CET)
  - Summer (DST): UTC+2 (CEST)
- Postal code: 430 01
- Website: www.nezabylice.cz

Nezabylice (German: Neosablitz) is a municipality and village in Chomutov District in the Ústí nad Labem Region of the Czech Republic. It has about 300 inhabitants.

Nezabylice lies approximately 8 kilometres (5 mi) south-east of Chomutov, 47 km (29 mi) south-west of Ústí nad Labem, and 77 km (48 mi) north-west of Prague.

== Administrative division ==
Nezabylice consists of two municipal parts (in brackets population according to the 2021 census):

- Nezabylice (151)
- Hořenec (98)

== Demographics ==
Historical population
Year	Pop.	±%
1869	576	—
1880	599	+4.0%
1890	655	+9.3%
1900	618	−5.6%
1910	655	+6.0%
1921	626	−4.4%
1930	622	−0.6%
1950	305	−51.0%
1961	269	−11.8%
1970	303	+12.6%
1980	280	−7.6%
1991	173	−38.2%
2001	199	+15.0%
2011	194	−2.5%
2021	249	+28.4%
Source: Censuses
