= Spořice =

- Municipality
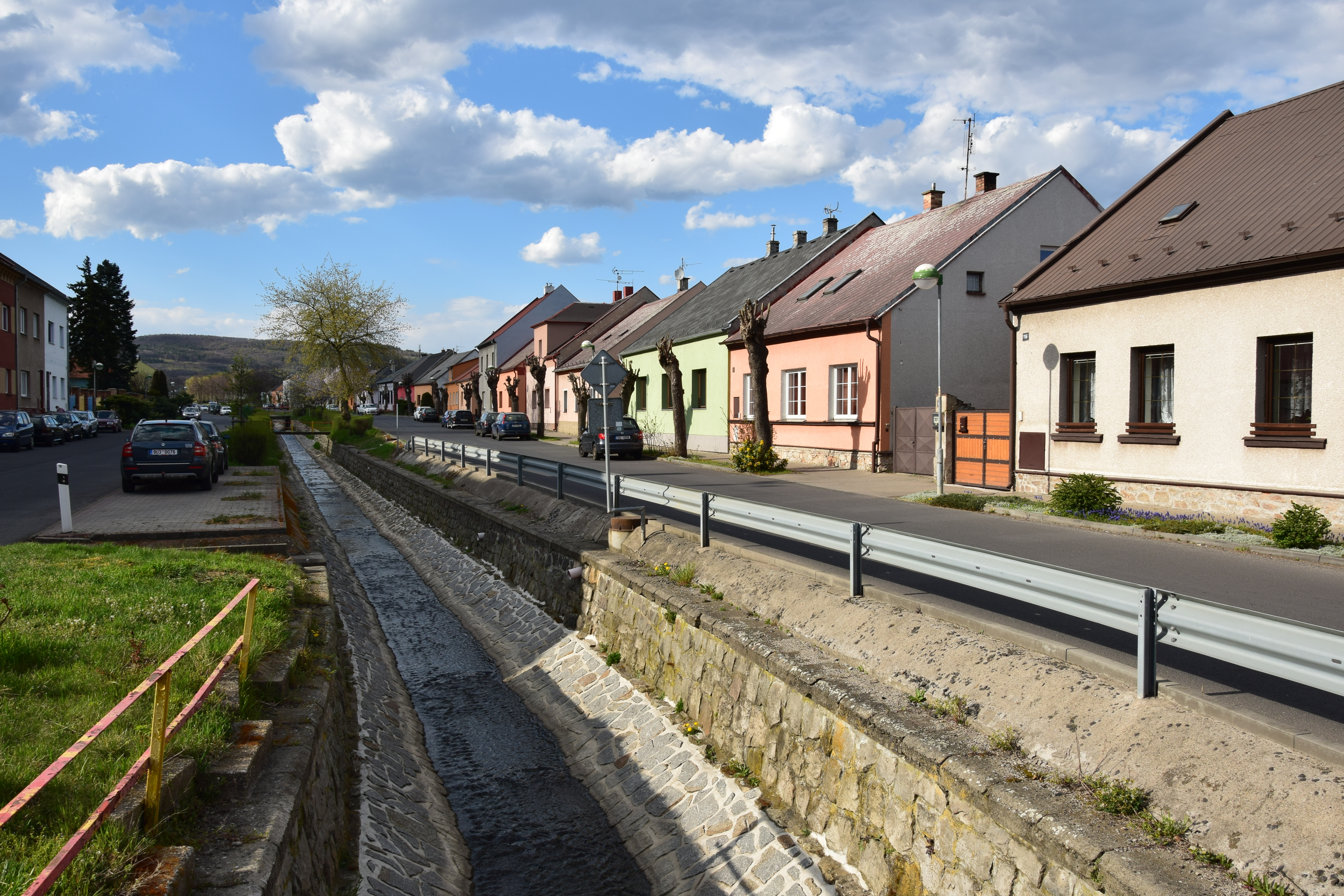
- Lipová street

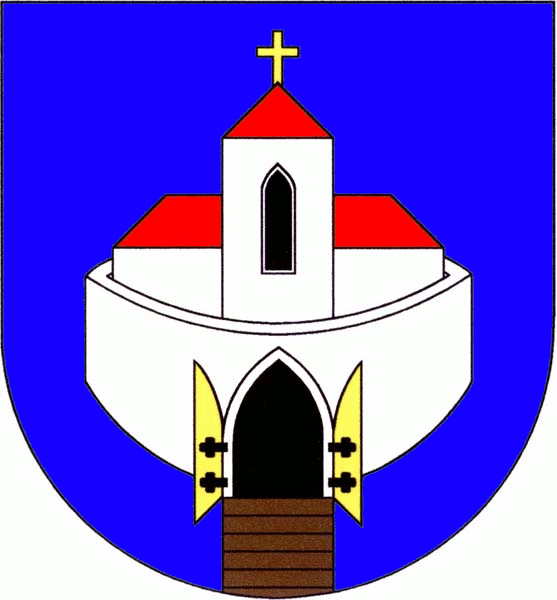
- Flag Coat of arms

- Location in the Czech Republic
- Coordinates: 50°26′28″N 13°23′31″E
- Country: Czech Republic
- Region: Ústí nad Labem
- District: Chomutov
- First mentioned: 1281

Area
  - Total: 16.66 km^{2} (6.43 sq mi)
- Elevation: 333 m (1,093 ft)

Population (2026-01-01)
  - Total: 1,550
  - Density: 93.0/km^{2} (241/sq mi)
- Time zone: UTC+1 (CET)
  - Summer (DST): UTC+2 (CEST)
- Postal code: 431 01
- Website: www.obecsporice.cz

Spořice (German: Sporitz) is a municipality and village in Chomutov District in the Ústí nad Labem Region of the Czech Republic. It has about 1,600 inhabitants.

== Demographics ==
Historical population
Year	Pop.	±%
1869	1,239	—
1880	1,427	+15.2%
1890	1,676	+17.4%
1900	2,230	+33.1%
1910	2,980	+33.6%
1921	3,294	+10.5%
1930	3,467	+5.3%
1950	2,311	−33.3%
1961	2,193	−5.1%
1970	1,487	−32.2%
1980	1,103	−25.8%
1991	810	−26.6%
2001	876	+8.1%
2011	1,271	+45.1%
2021	1,433	+12.7%
Source: Censuses
