= Místo =

- Municipality
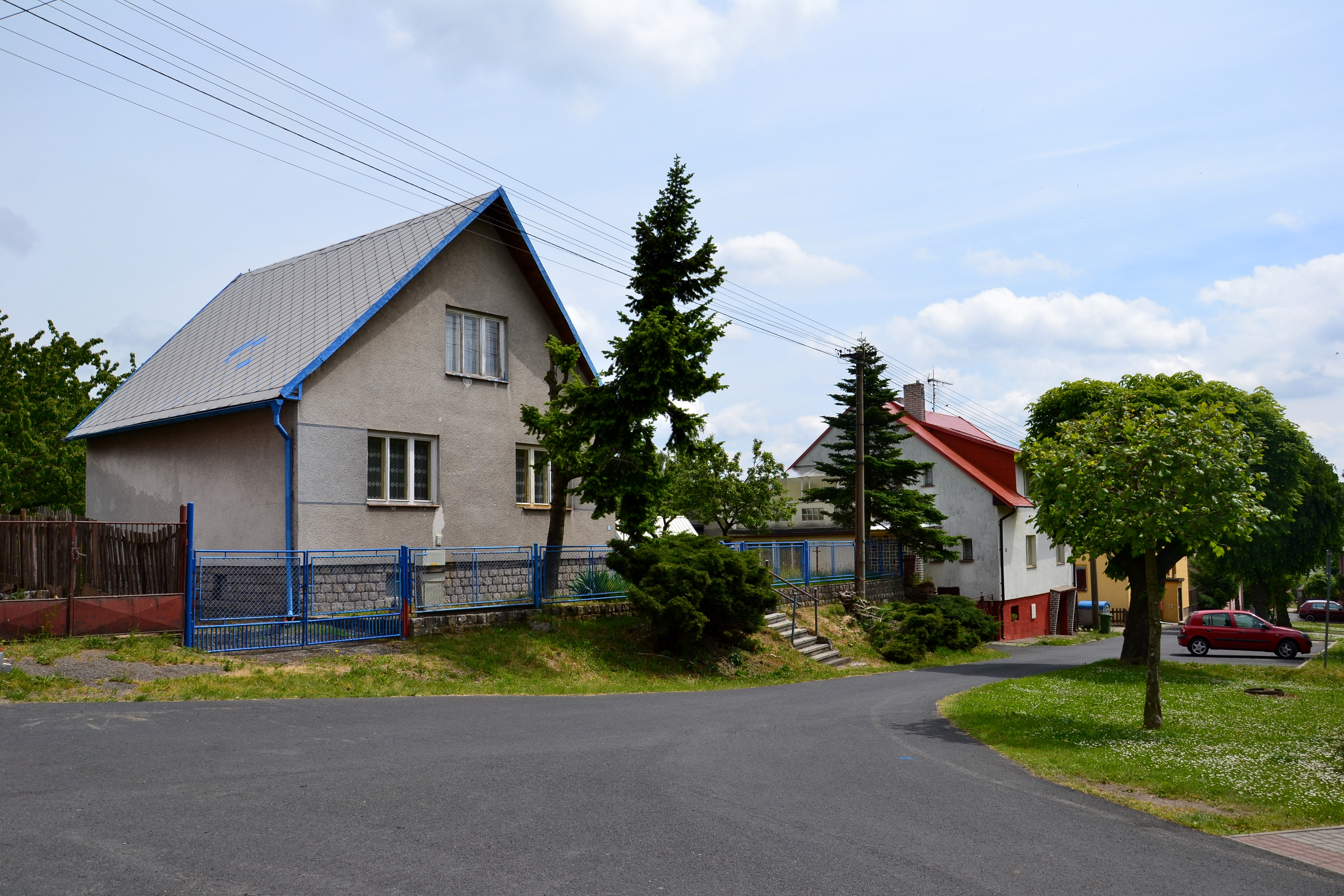
- Centre of Místo

- Location in the Czech Republic
- Coordinates: 50°26′50″N 13°16′3″E
- Country: Czech Republic
- Region: Ústí nad Labem
- District: Chomutov
- First mentioned: 1518

Area
  - Total: 13.39 km^{2} (5.17 sq mi)
- Elevation: 576 m (1,890 ft)

Population (2026-01-01)
  - Total: 433
  - Density: 32.3/km^{2} (83.8/sq mi)
- Time zone: UTC+1 (CET)
  - Summer (DST): UTC+2 (CEST)
- Postal codes: 430 01, 431 58
- Website: www.obec-misto.cz

Místo (German: Platz) is a municipality and village in Chomutov District in the Ústí nad Labem Region of the Czech Republic. It has about 400 inhabitants.

Místo lies approximately 10 kilometres (6 mi) west of Chomutov, 60 km (37 mi) south-west of Ústí nad Labem, and 91 km (57 mi) north-west of Prague.

== Administrative division ==
Místo consists of three municipal parts (in brackets population according to the 2021 census):

- Místo (264)
- Blahuňov (120)
- Vysoká Jedle (39)

== Demographics ==
Historical population
Year	Pop.	±%
1869	686	—
1880	604	−12.0%
1890	609	+0.8%
1900	642	+5.4%
1910	627	−2.3%
1921	589	−6.1%
1930	592	+0.5%
1950	337	−43.1%
1961	321	−4.7%
1970	305	−5.0%
1980	332	+8.9%
1991	353	+6.3%
2001	380	+7.6%
2011	468	+23.2%
2021	423	−9.6%
Source: Censuses
