= Všehrdy (Chomutov District) =

- Municipality
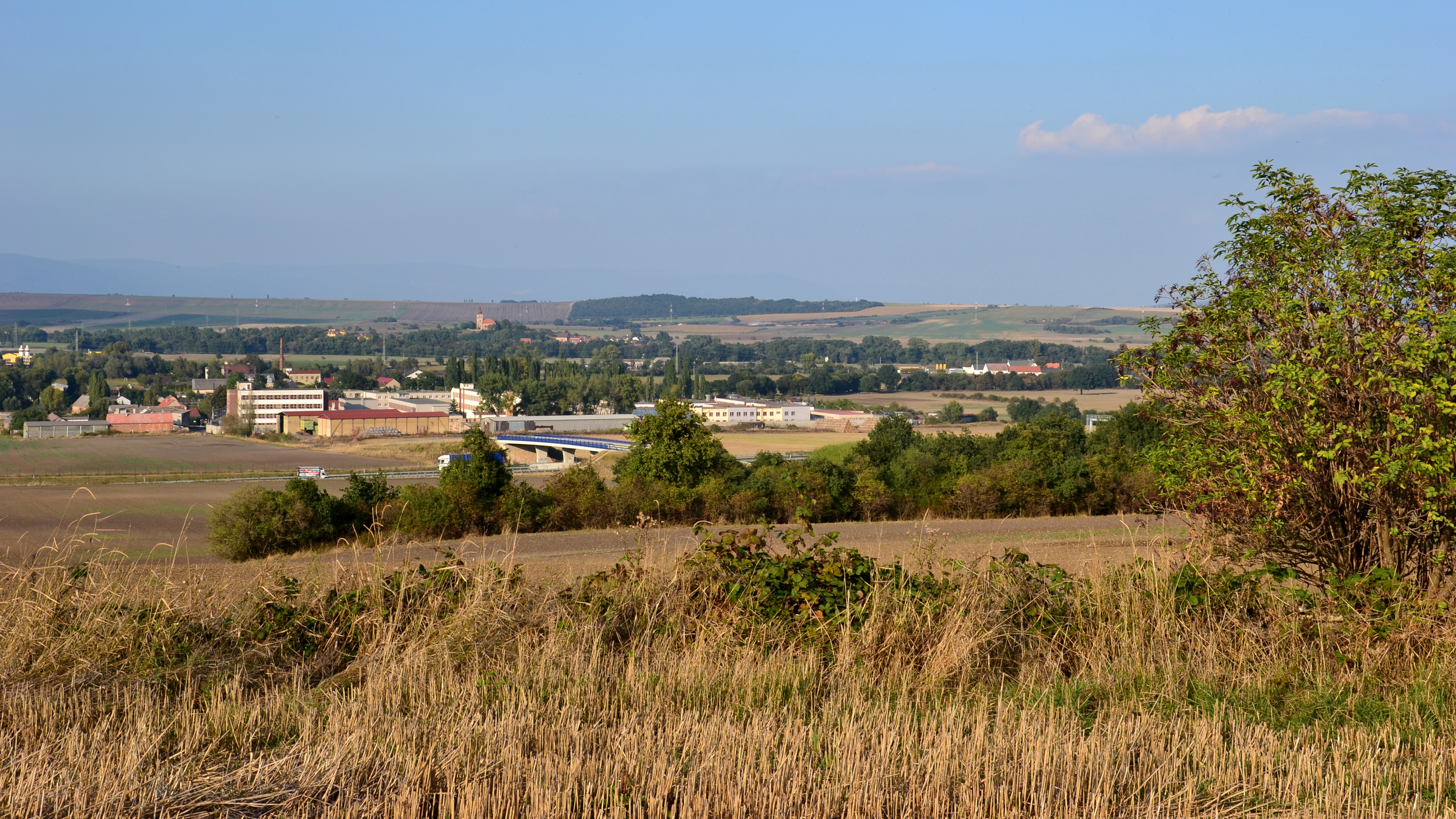
- View from the south

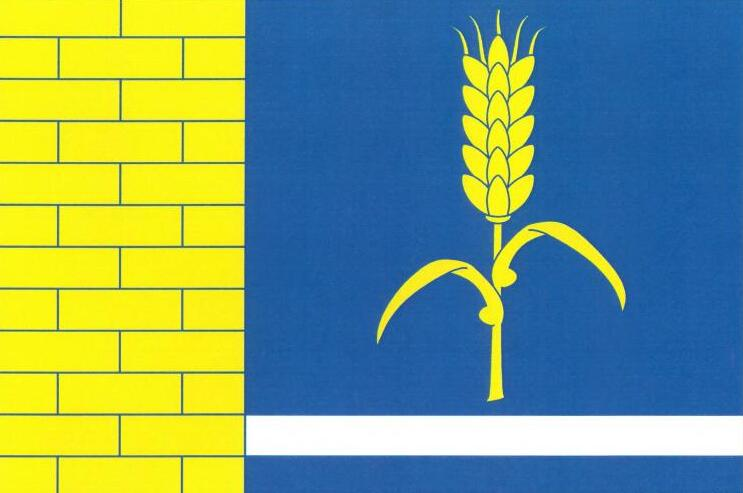
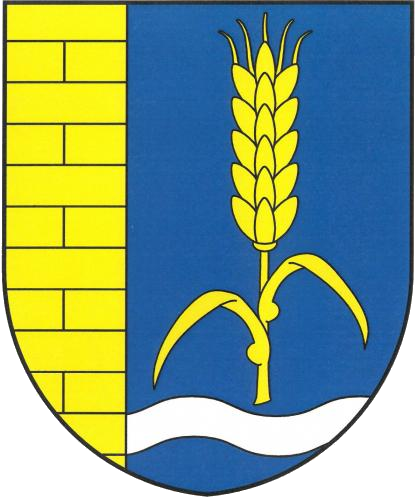
- Flag Coat of arms

- Location in the Czech Republic
- Coordinates: 50°25′12″N 13°27′41″E
- Country: Czech Republic
- Region: Ústí nad Labem
- District: Chomutov
- First mentioned: 1295

Area
  - Total: 3.86 km^{2} (1.49 sq mi)
- Elevation: 282 m (925 ft)

Population (2026-01-01)
  - Total: 143
  - Density: 37.0/km^{2} (96.0/sq mi)
- Time zone: UTC+1 (CET)
  - Summer (DST): UTC+2 (CEST)
- Postal code: 430 01
- Website: www.vsehrdy.cz

Všehrdy (German: Tschern) is a municipality and village in Chomutov District in the Ústí nad Labem Region of the Czech Republic. It has about 100 inhabitants.

Všehrdy lies approximately 8 kilometres (5 mi) south-east of Chomutov, 50 km (31 mi) south-west of Ústí nad Labem, and 78 km (48 mi) north-west of Prague.

== Demographics ==
Historical population
Year	Pop.	±%
1869	197	—
1880	196	−0.5%
1890	209	+6.6%
1900	260	+24.4%
1910	242	−6.9%
1921	239	−1.2%
1930	252	+5.4%
1950	180	−28.6%
1961	165	−8.3%
1970	183	+10.9%
1980	111	−39.3%
1991	127	+14.4%
2001	138	+8.7%
2011	623	+351.4%
2021	535	−14.1%
Source: Censuses

== Economy ==
The Všehrdy Prison is the main employer in Všehrdy. It is classified as a low-, medium- and high-security prison for men with a capacity of 540 prisoners. There is also a ward for juvenile prisoners. The prison employs more than 200 people.
