= Kalek =

- Municipality
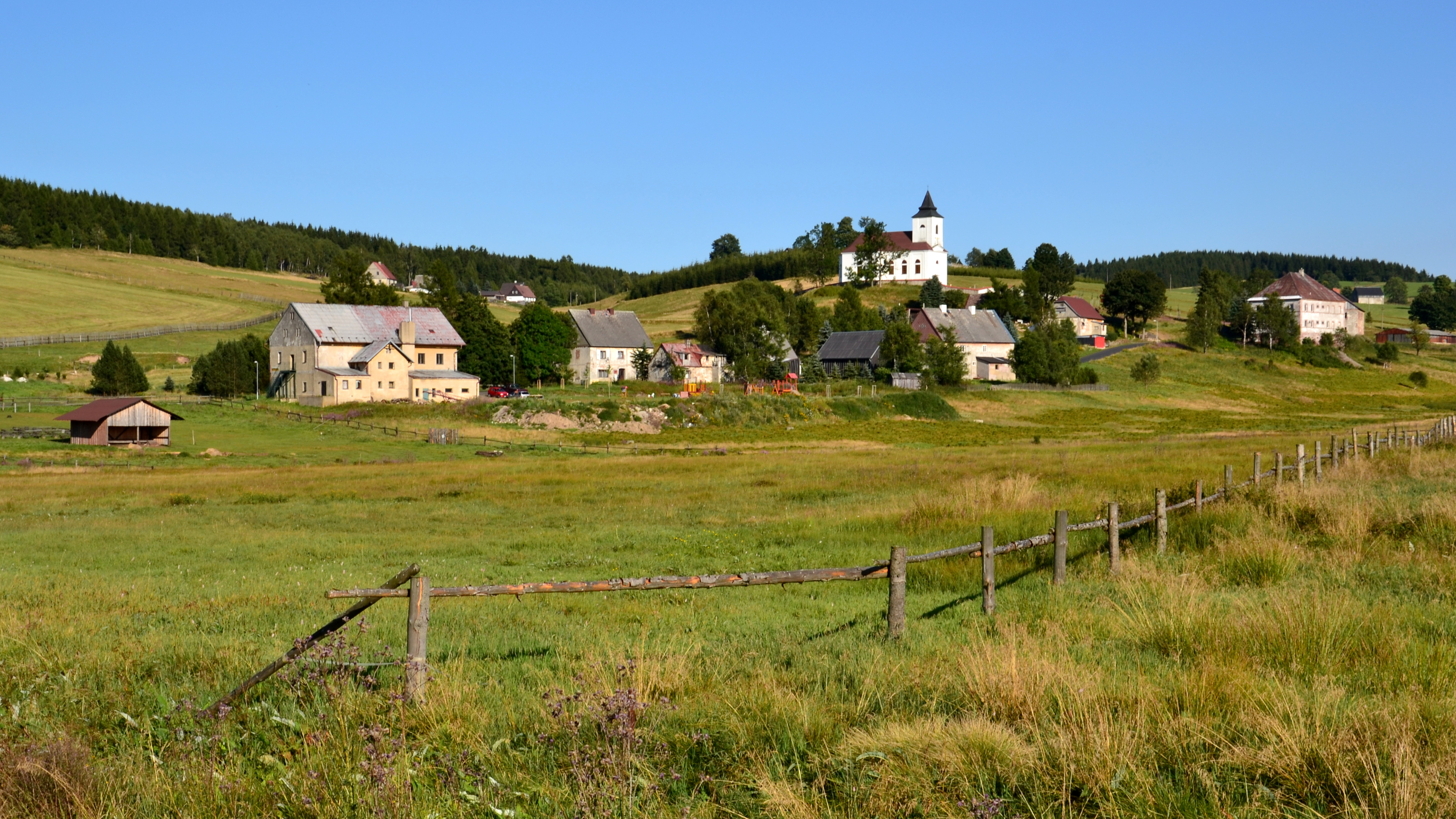
- Eastern part of Kalek with the Church of Saint Wenceslaus

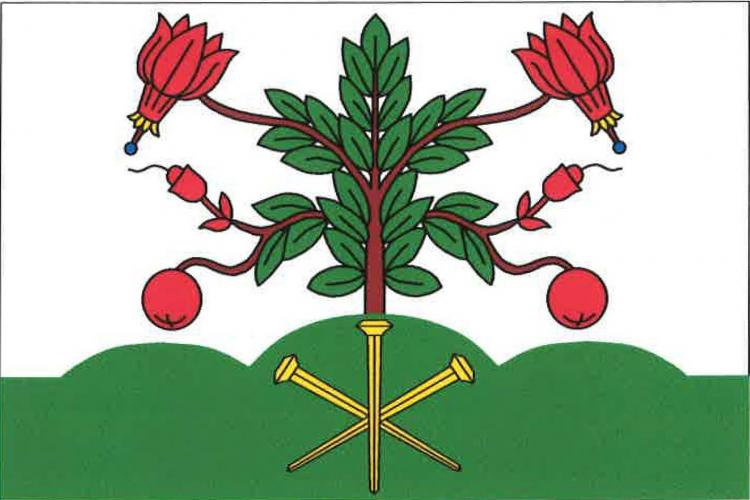
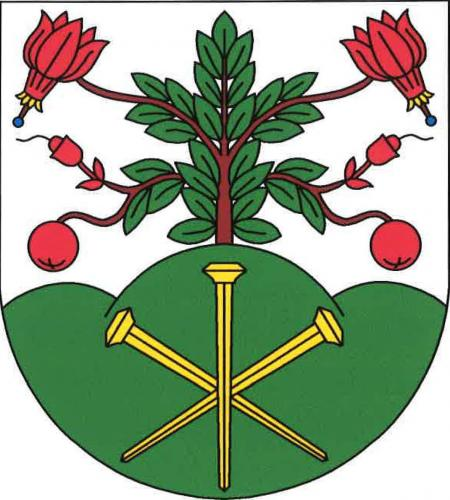
- Flag Coat of arms

- Location in the Czech Republic
- Coordinates: 50°34′40″N 13°19′19″E
- Country: Czech Republic
- Region: Ústí nad Labem
- District: Chomutov
- First mentioned: 1555

Area
  - Total: 48.66 km^{2} (18.79 sq mi)
- Elevation: 700 m (2,300 ft)

Population (2026-01-01)
  - Total: 251
  - Density: 5.16/km^{2} (13.4/sq mi)
- Time zone: UTC+1 (CET)
  - Summer (DST): UTC+2 (CEST)
- Postal code: 431 32
- Website: www.obeckalek.cz

Kalek (German: Kallich) is a municipality and village in Chomutov District in the Ústí nad Labem Region of the Czech Republic. It has about 300 inhabitants.

Kalek lies approximately 14 kilometres (9 mi) north of Chomutov, 50 km (31 mi) west of Ústí nad Labem, and 94 km (58 mi) north-west of Prague.

== Administrative division ==
Kalek consists of five municipal parts (in brackets population according to the 2021 census):

- Kalek (102)
- Jindřichova Ves (80)
- Načetín (46)

== Demographics ==
Historical population
Year	Pop.	±%
1869	2,599	—
1880	2,759	+6.2%
1890	2,649	−4.0%
1900	2,690	+1.5%
1910	2,685	−0.2%
1921	2,131	−20.6%
1930	2,050	−3.8%
1950	305	−85.1%
1961	246	−19.3%
1970	208	−15.4%
1980	150	−27.9%
1991	104	−30.7%
2001	159	+52.9%
2011	187	+17.6%
2021	228	+21.9%
Source: Censuses
