= Strupčice =

- Municipality
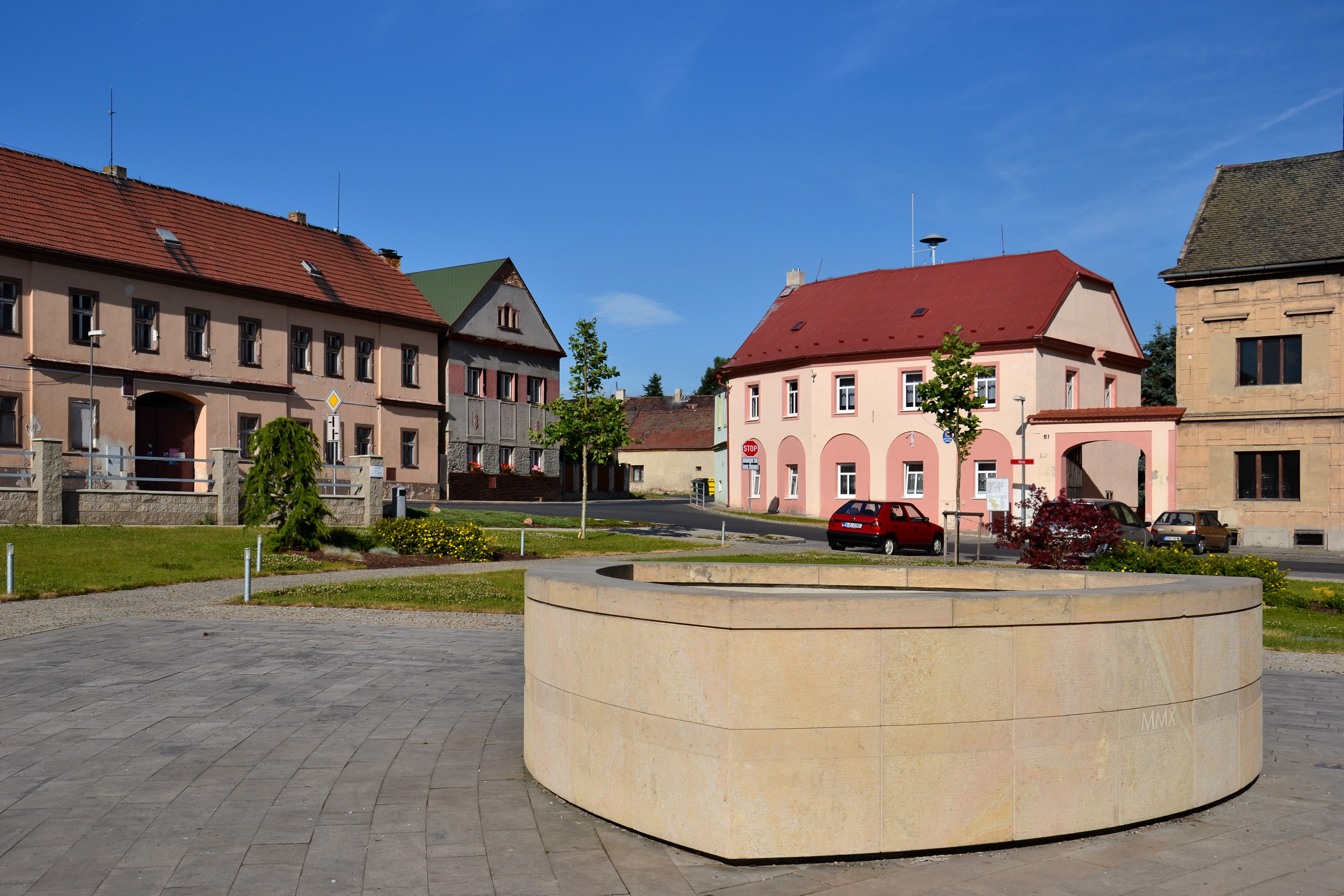
- Centre of Strupčice

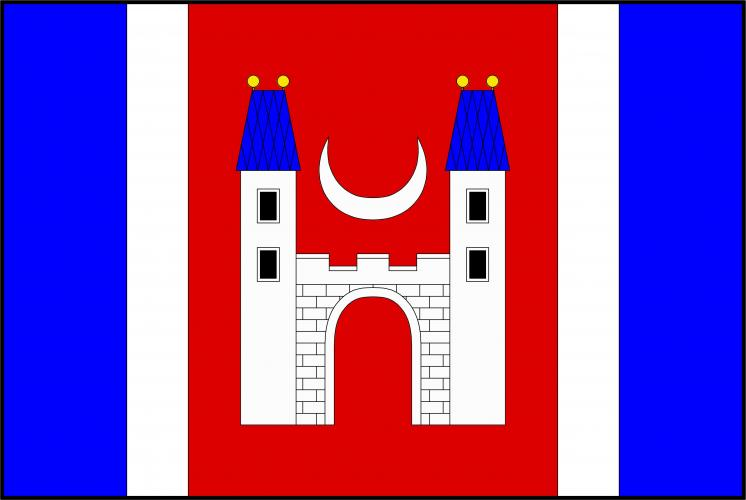
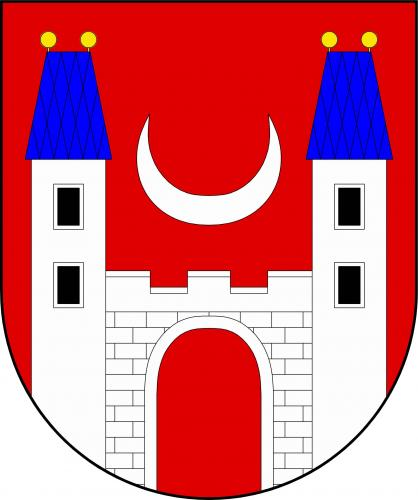
- Flag Coat of arms

- Location in the Czech Republic
- Coordinates: 50°28′16″N 13°31′50″E
- Country: Czech Republic
- Region: Ústí nad Labem
- District: Chomutov
- First mentioned: 1352

Area
  - Total: 19.66 km^{2} (7.59 sq mi)
- Elevation: 258 m (846 ft)

Population (2026-01-01)
  - Total: 1,194
  - Density: 60.73/km^{2} (157.3/sq mi)
- Time zone: UTC+1 (CET)
  - Summer (DST): UTC+2 (CEST)
- Postal codes: 431 11, 431 14
- Website: www.obec-strupcice.cz

Strupčice (German: Trupschitz) is a municipality and village in Chomutov District in the Ústí nad Labem Region of the Czech Republic. It has about 1,200 inhabitants.

Strupčice lies approximately 10 kilometres (6 mi) east of Chomutov, 42 km (26 mi) south-west of Ústí nad Labem, and 77 km (48 mi) north-west of Prague.

== Administrative division ==
Strupčice consists of four municipal parts (in brackets population according to the 2021 census):

- Strupčice (785)
- Hošnice (55)
- Okořín (146)
- Sušany (64)

== Demographics ==
Historical population
Year	Pop.	±%
1869	1,197	—
1880	1,268	+5.9%
1890	1,410	+11.2%
1900	1,530	+8.5%
1910	1,619	+5.8%
1921	1,868	+15.4%
1930	2,316	+24.0%
1950	1,372	−40.8%
1961	1,148	−16.3%
1970	920	−19.9%
1980	761	−17.3%
1991	568	−25.4%
2001	654	+15.1%
2011	722	+10.4%
2021	1,050	+45.4%
Source: Censuses
