= Račetice =

- Municipality
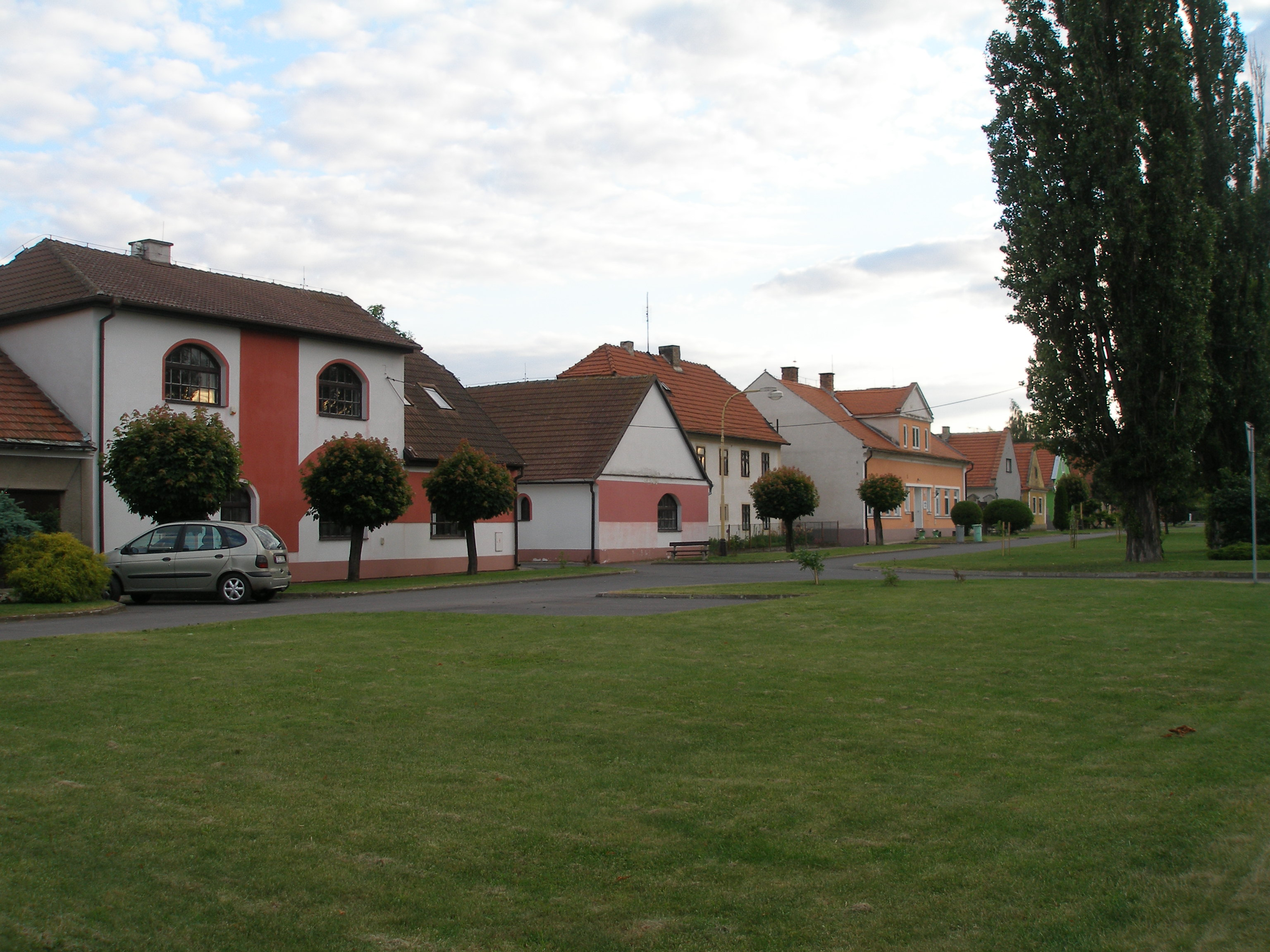
- Centre of Račetice

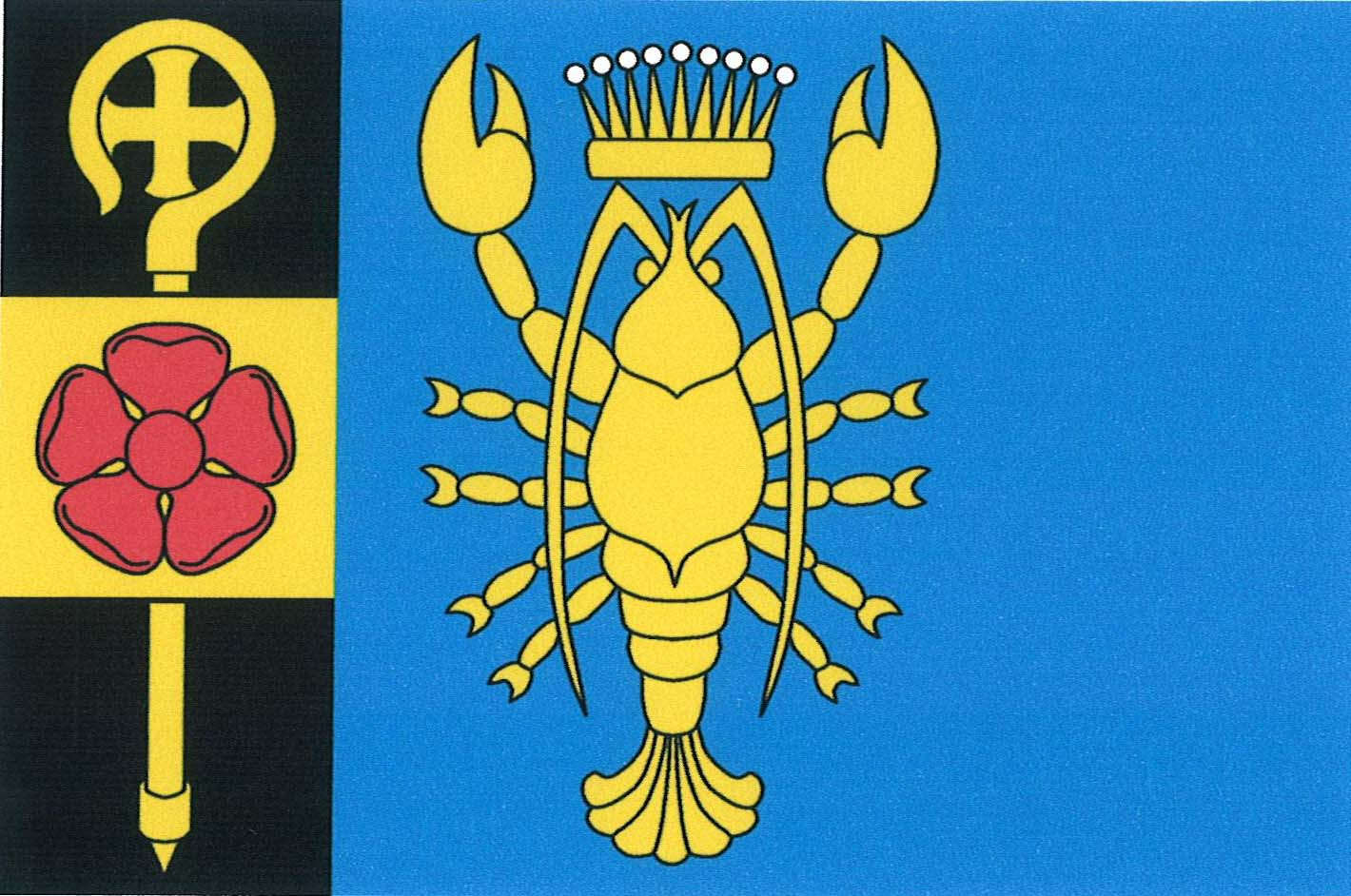
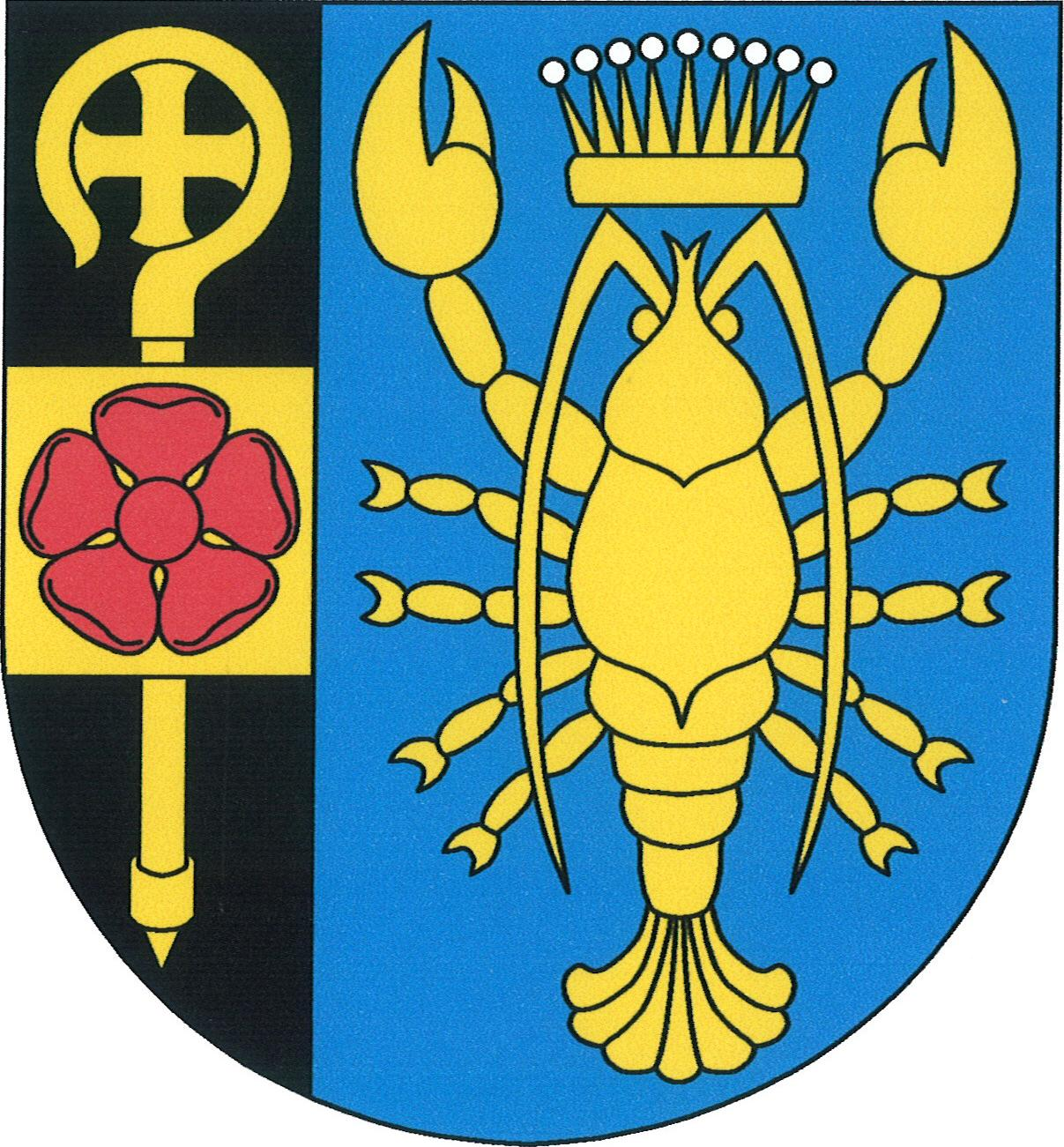
- Flag Coat of arms

- Location in the Czech Republic
- Coordinates: 50°18′19″N 13°21′54″E
- Country: Czech Republic
- Region: Ústí nad Labem
- District: Chomutov
- First mentioned: 1209

Area
  - Total: 3.86 km^{2} (1.49 sq mi)
- Elevation: 289 m (948 ft)

Population (2026-01-01)
  - Total: 433
  - Density: 112/km^{2} (291/sq mi)
- Time zone: UTC+1 (CET)
  - Summer (DST): UTC+2 (CEST)
- Postal codes: 438 01
- Website: www.racetice.cz

Račetice (German: Ratschitz) is a municipality and village in Chomutov District in the Ústí nad Labem Region of the Czech Republic. It has about 400 inhabitants.

Račetice lies approximately 19 kilometres (12 mi) south of Chomutov, 63 km (39 mi) south-west of Ústí nad Labem, and 80 km (50 mi) west of Prague.

== Demographics ==
Historical population
Year	Pop.	±%
1869	253	—
1880	311	+22.9%
1890	282	−9.3%
1900	260	−7.8%
1910	235	−9.6%
1921	280	+19.1%
1930	322	+15.0%
1950	173	−46.3%
1961	129	−25.4%
1970	169	+31.0%
1980	154	−8.9%
1991	225	+46.1%
2001	236	+4.9%
2011	383	+62.3%
2021	387	+1.0%
Source: Censuses
