= Černovice (Chomutov District) =

- Municipality
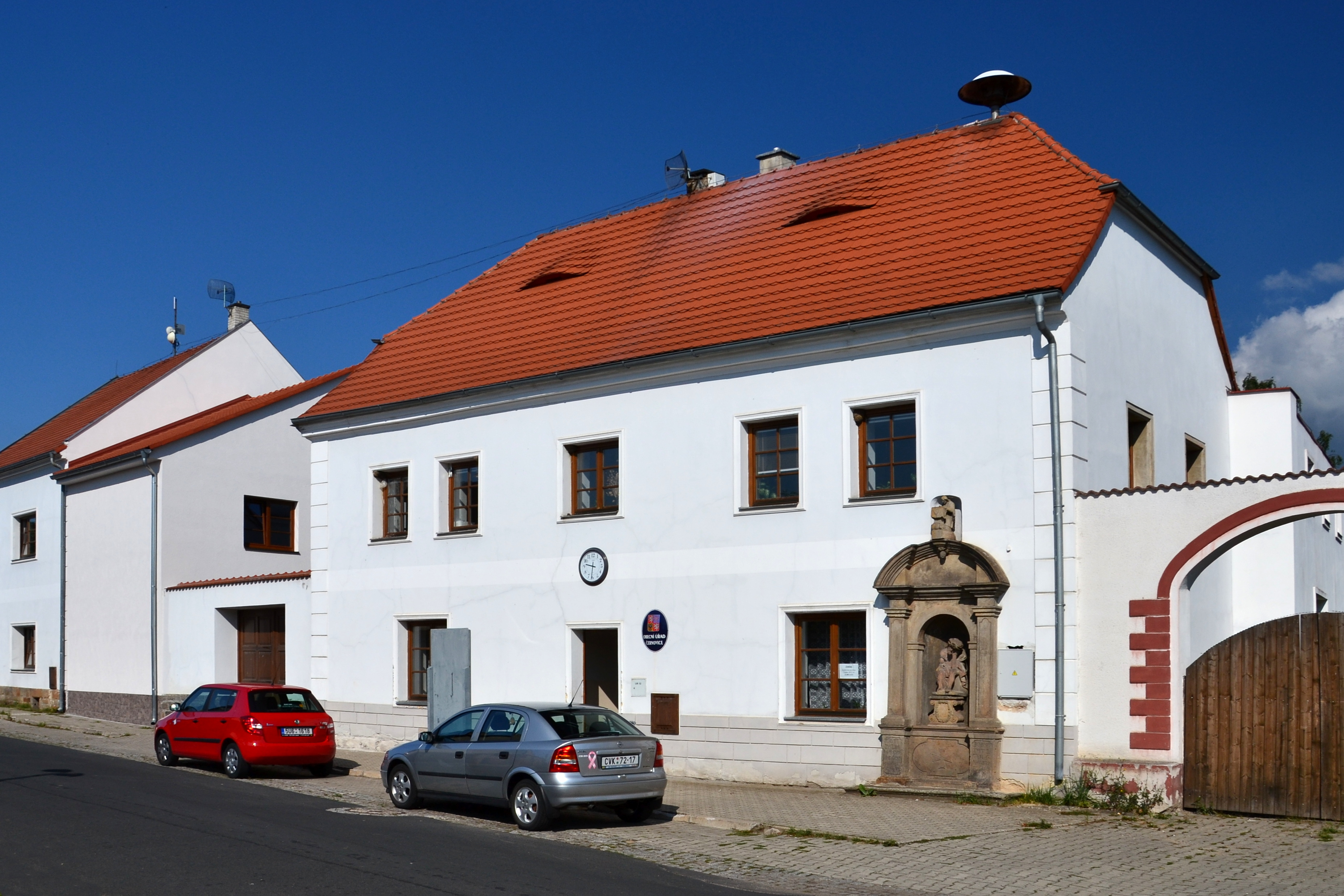
- Municipal office

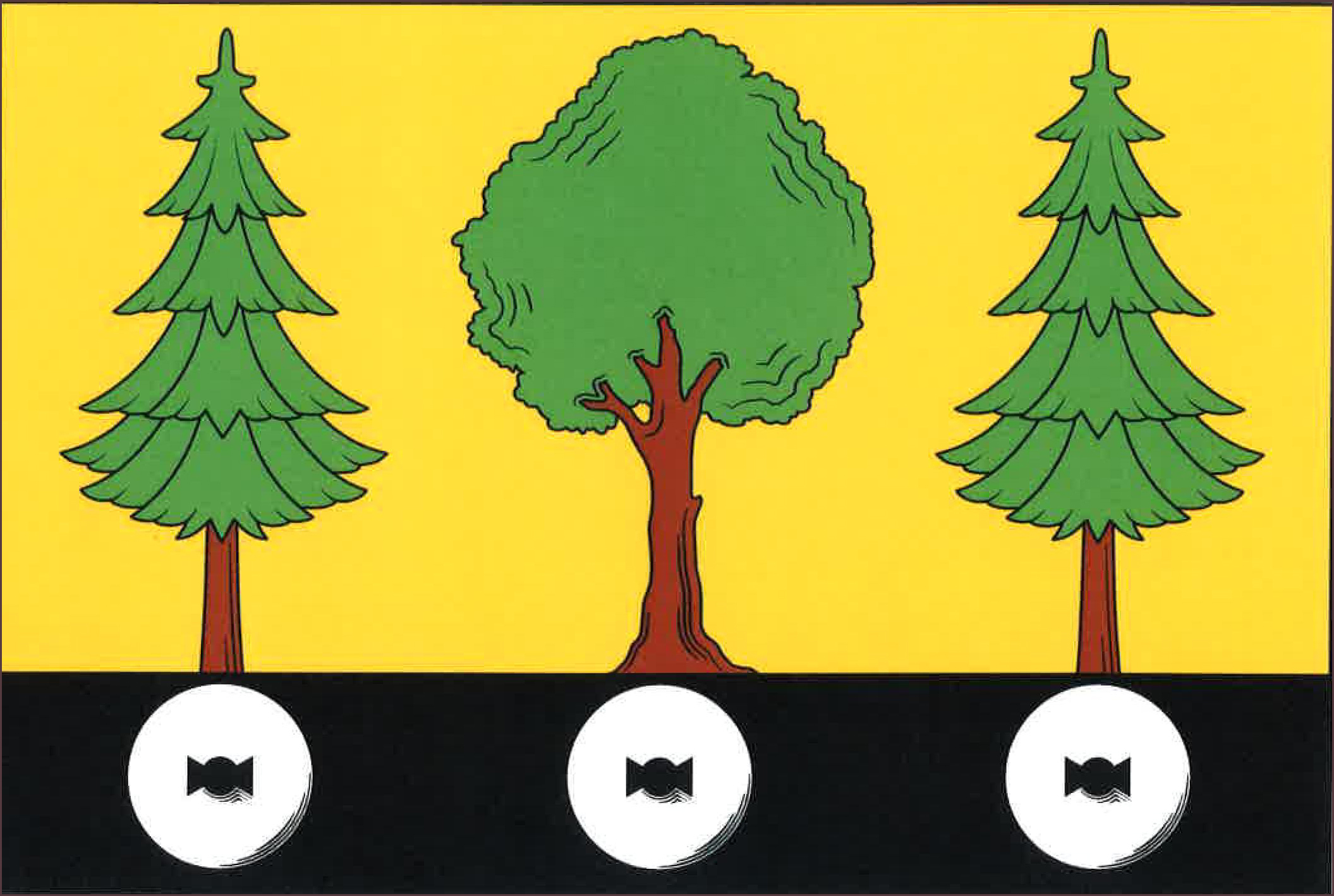
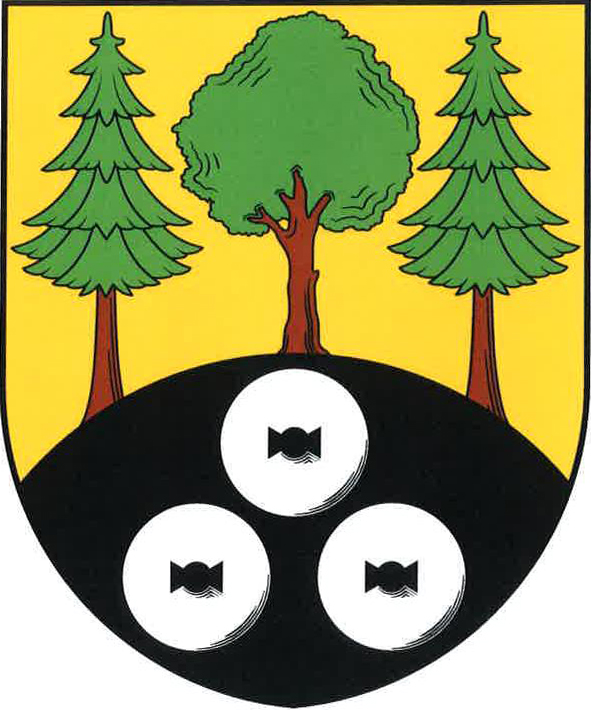
- Flag Coat of arms

- Location in the Czech Republic
- Coordinates: 50°26′52″N 13°21′34″E
- Country: Czech Republic
- Region: Ústí nad Labem
- District: Chomutov
- First mentioned: 1281

Area
  - Total: 5.59 km^{2} (2.16 sq mi)
- Elevation: 375 m (1,230 ft)

Population (2026-01-01)
  - Total: 694
  - Density: 124/km^{2} (322/sq mi)
- Time zone: UTC+1 (CET)
  - Summer (DST): UTC+2 (CEST)
- Postal code: 430 01
- Website: www.cernovice-ulk.cz

Černovice (German: Tschernowitz) is a municipality and village in Chomutov District in the Ústí nad Labem Region of the Czech Republic. It has about 700 inhabitants.

== Demographics ==
Historical population
| Year | Pop. | ±% |
|---|---|---|
| 1869 | 439 | — |
| 1880 | 424 | −3.4% |
| 1890 | 460 | +8.5% |
| 1900 | 553 | +20.2% |
| 1910 | 724 | +30.9% |
| 1921 | 844 | +16.6% |
| 1930 | 892 | +5.7% |
| 1950 | 644 | −27.8% |
| 1961 | 613 | −4.8% |
| 1970 | 501 | −18.3% |
| 1980 | 428 | −14.6% |
| 1991 | 337 | −21.3% |
| 2001 | 378 | +12.2% |
| 2011 | 497 | +31.5% |
| 2021 | 622 | +25.2% |
Source: Censuses
