= Libědice =

- Municipality
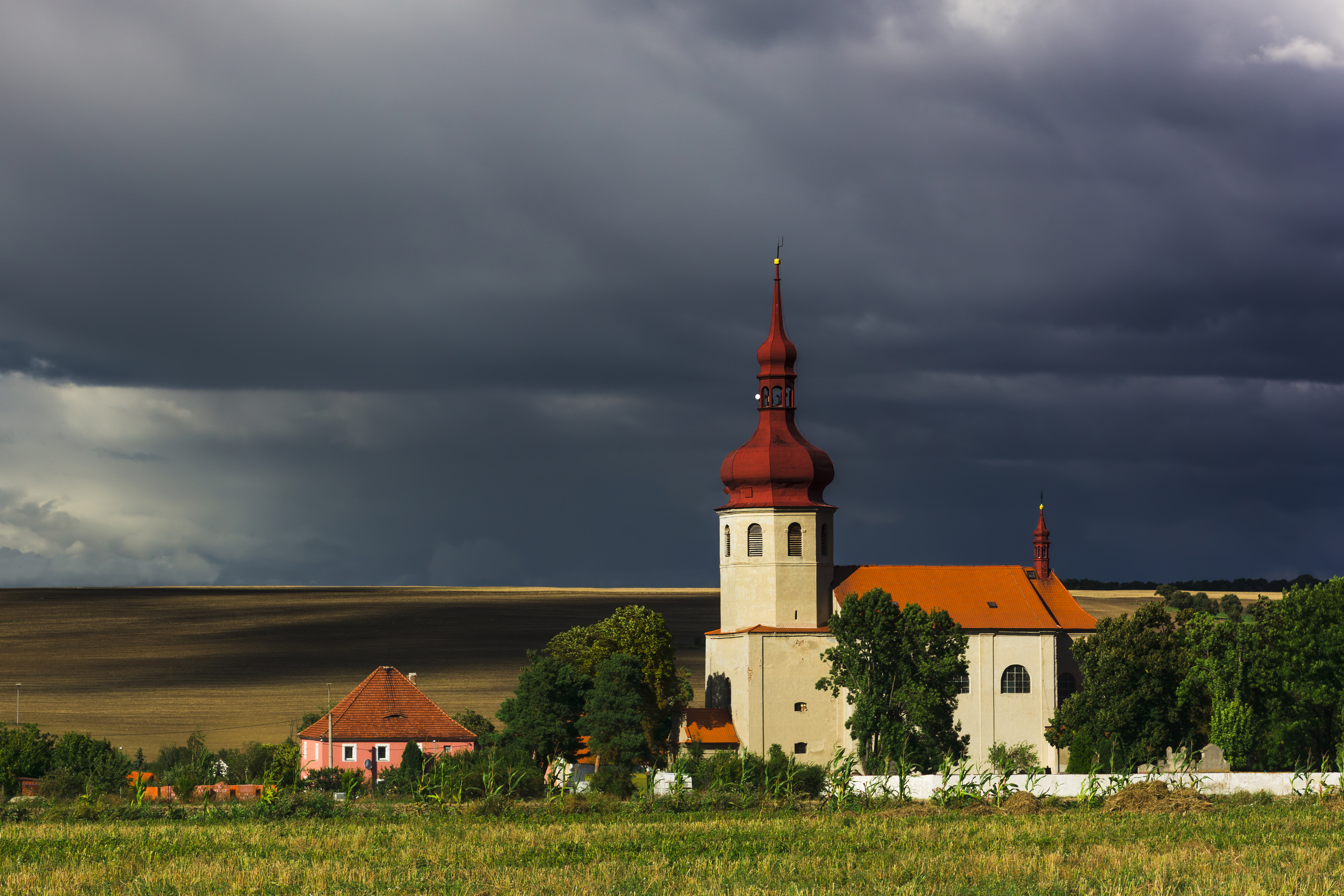
- Church of Saint Vitus

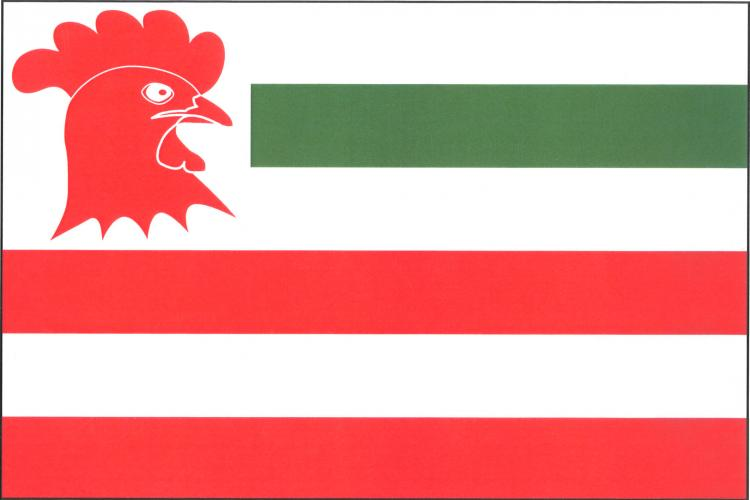
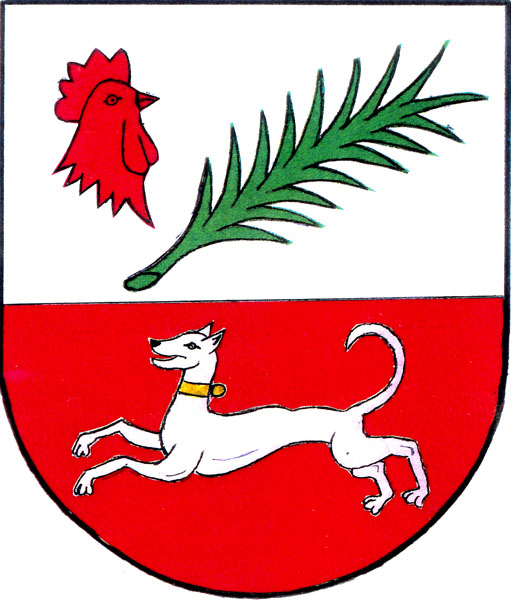
- Flag Coat of arms

- Location in the Czech Republic
- Coordinates: 50°18′58″N 13°23′8″E
- Country: Czech Republic
- Region: Ústí nad Labem
- District: Chomutov
- First mentioned: 1226

Area
  - Total: 11.04 km^{2} (4.26 sq mi)
- Elevation: 255 m (837 ft)

Population (2026-01-01)
  - Total: 240
  - Density: 22/km^{2} (56/sq mi)
- Time zone: UTC+1 (CET)
  - Summer (DST): UTC+2 (CEST)
- Postal code: 438 01
- Website: www.libedice.cz

Libědice (German: Libotitz) is a municipality and village in Chomutov District in the Ústí nad Labem Region of the Czech Republic. It has about 200 inhabitants.

Libědice lies approximately 17 kilometres (11 mi) south of Chomutov, 60 km (37 mi) south-west of Ústí nad Labem, and 78 km (48 mi) west of Prague.

== Administrative division ==
Libědice consists of two municipal parts (in brackets population according to the 2021 census):

- Libědice (199)
- Čejkovice (35)

== Demographics ==
Historical population
Year	Pop.	±%
1869	818	—
1880	955	+16.7%
1890	999	+4.6%
1900	932	−6.7%
1910	986	+5.8%
1921	988	+0.2%
1930	904	−8.5%
1950	394	−56.4%
1961	409	+3.8%
1970	326	−20.3%
1980	255	−21.8%
1991	209	−18.0%
2001	206	−1.4%
2011	236	+14.6%
2021	234	−0.8%
Source: Censuses
