= Kunratice =

Kunratice may refer to places in the Czech Republic:

- Kunratice (Děčín District), a municipality and village in the Ústí nad Labem Region
- Kunratice (Liberec District), a municipality and village in the Liberec Region
- Kunratice (Prague), a district of Prague
- Kunratice u Cvikova, a municipality and village in the Liberec Region
- Kunratice, a village and part of Šluknov in the Ústí nad Labem Region
- Liberec XXIX-Kunratice, a city part of Liberec in the Liberec Region
