= Valkeřice =

- Municipality
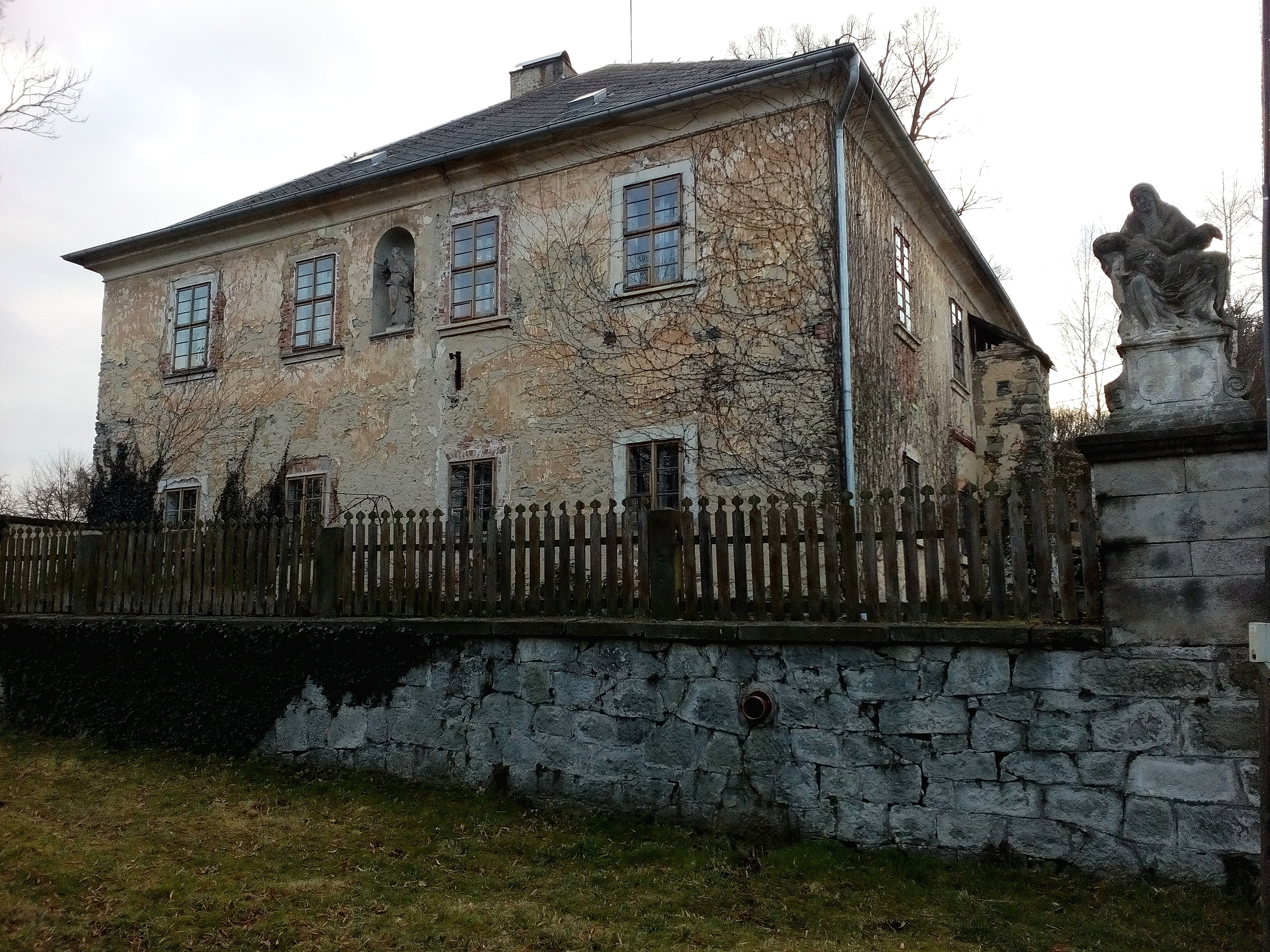
- Rectory

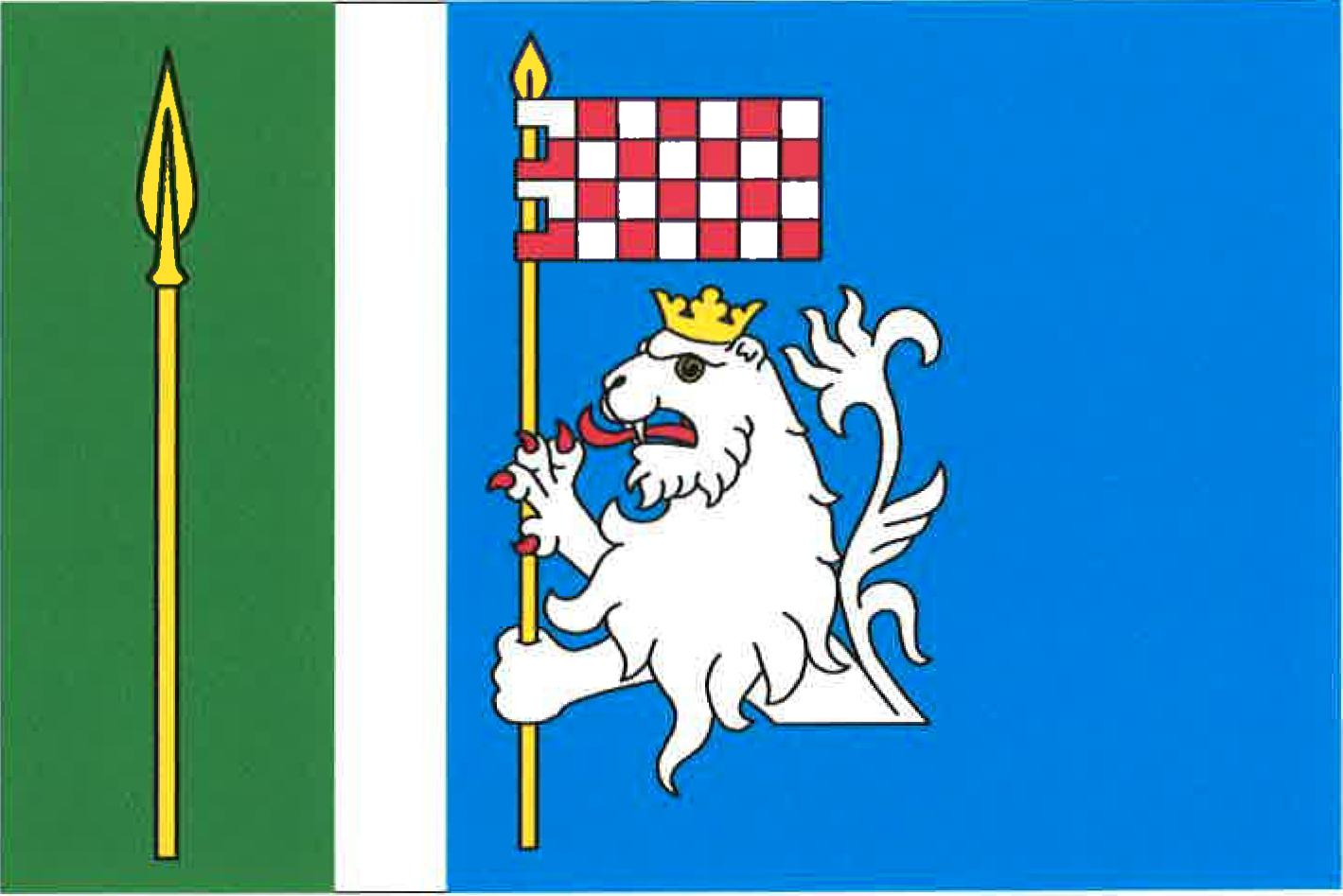
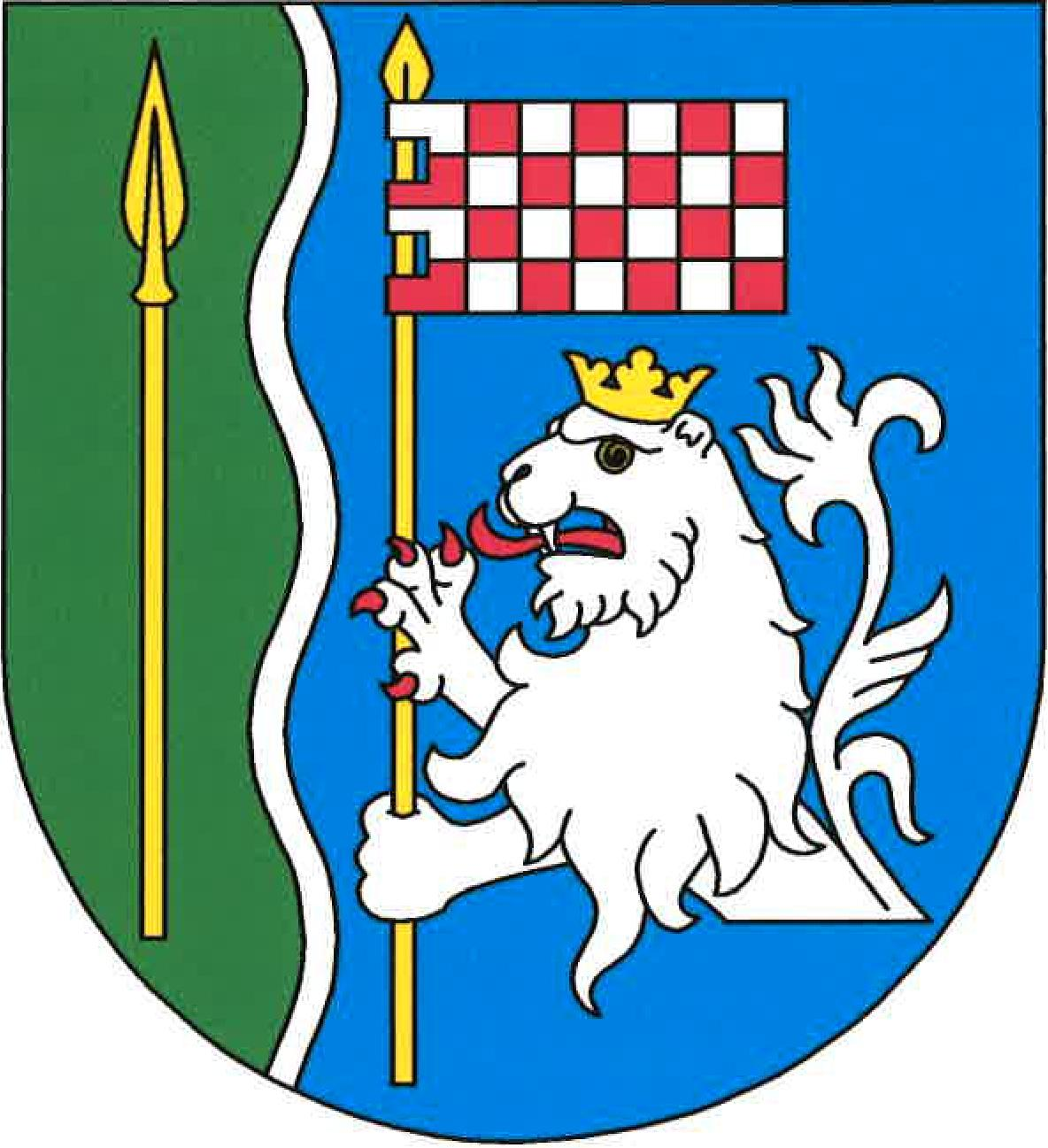
- Flag Coat of arms

- Location in the Czech Republic
- Coordinates: 50°42′7″N 14°19′19″E
- Country: Czech Republic
- Region: Ústí nad Labem
- District: Děčín
- First mentioned: 1363

Area
  - Total: 14.12 km^{2} (5.45 sq mi)
- Elevation: 443 m (1,453 ft)

Population (2026-01-01)
  - Total: 412
  - Density: 29.2/km^{2} (75.6/sq mi)
- Time zone: UTC+1 (CET)
  - Summer (DST): UTC+2 (CEST)
- Postal code: 407 24
- Website: www.valkerice.cz

Valkeřice (German: Algersdorf) is a municipality and village in Děčín District in the Ústí nad Labem Region of the Czech Republic. It has about 400 inhabitants.

Valkeřice lies approximately 13 kilometres (8 mi) south-east of Děčín, 21 km (13 mi) east of Ústí nad Labem, and 69 km (43 mi) north of Prague.

== Administrative division ==
Valkeřice consists of two municipal parts (in brackets population according to the 2021 census):

- Valkeřice (374)
- Sluková (0)

== Demographics ==
Historical population
Year	Pop.	±%
1869	1,785	—
1880	1,859	+4.1%
1890	1,814	−2.4%
1900	1,845	+1.7%
1910	1,884	+2.1%
1921	1,799	−4.5%
1930	1,890	+5.1%
1950	776	−58.9%
1961	595	−23.3%
1970	499	−16.1%
1980	456	−8.6%
1991	369	−19.1%
2001	409	+10.8%
2011	391	−4.4%
2021	374	−4.3%
Source: Censuses
