= Dobrná =

- Municipality
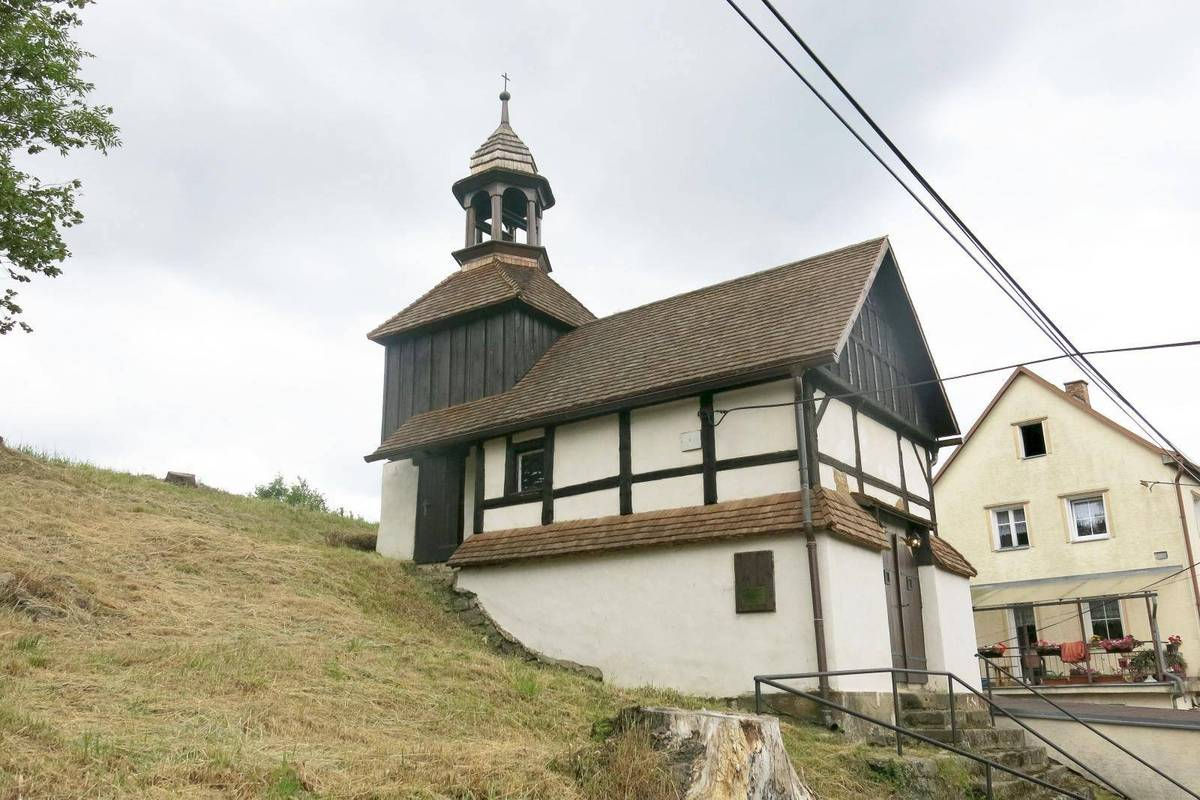
- Chapel of Saint John of Nepomuk

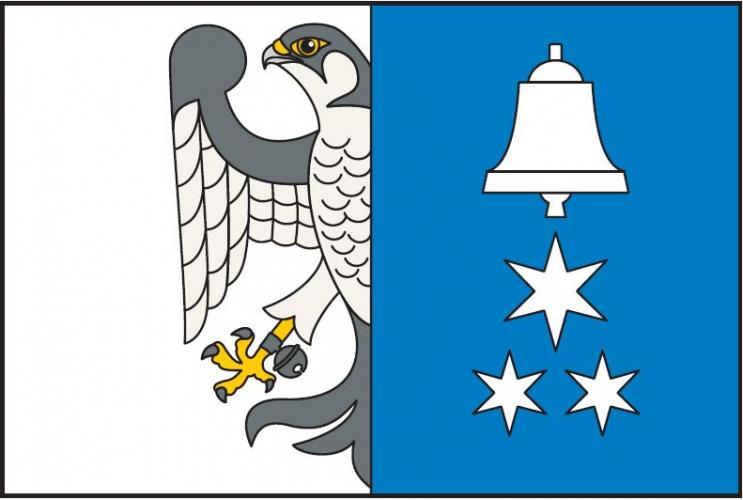
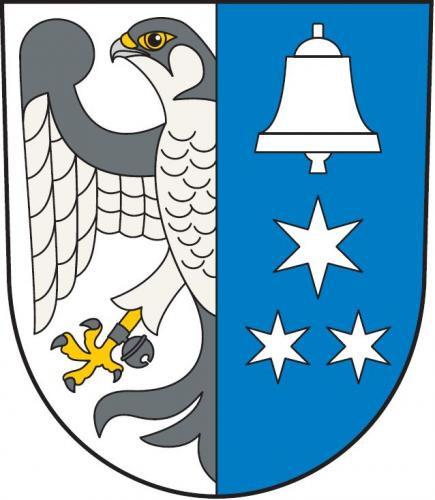
- Flag Coat of arms

- Location in the Czech Republic
- Coordinates: 50°46′11″N 14°17′36″E
- Country: Czech Republic
- Region: Ústí nad Labem
- District: Děčín
- First mentioned: 1543

Area
  - Total: 8.82 km^{2} (3.41 sq mi)
- Elevation: 397 m (1,302 ft)

Population (2026-01-01)
  - Total: 450
  - Density: 51/km^{2} (130/sq mi)
- Time zone: UTC+1 (CET)
  - Summer (DST): UTC+2 (CEST)
- Postal code: 407 41
- Website: www.obec-dobrna.cz

Dobrná is a municipality and village in Děčín District in the Ústí nad Labem Region of the Czech Republic. It has about 500 inhabitants.

Dobrná lies approximately 8 kilometres (5 mi) east of Děčín, 22 km (14 mi) north-east of Ústí nad Labem, and 77 km (48 mi) north of Prague.

== Administrative division ==
Dobrná consists of two municipal parts (in brackets population according to the 2021 census):

- Dobrná (371)
- Brložec (51)

== Demographics ==
Historical population
Year	Pop.	±%
1869	1,284	—
1880	1,295	+0.9%
1890	1,228	−5.2%
1900	1,253	+2.0%
1910	1,173	−6.4%
1921	1,048	−10.7%
1930	1,112	+6.1%
1950	480	−56.8%
1961	500	+4.2%
1970	525	+5.0%
1980	414	−21.1%
1991	370	−10.6%
2001	391	+5.7%
2011	435	+11.3%
2021	422	−3.0%
Source: Censuses
