= Horní Habartice =

- Municipality
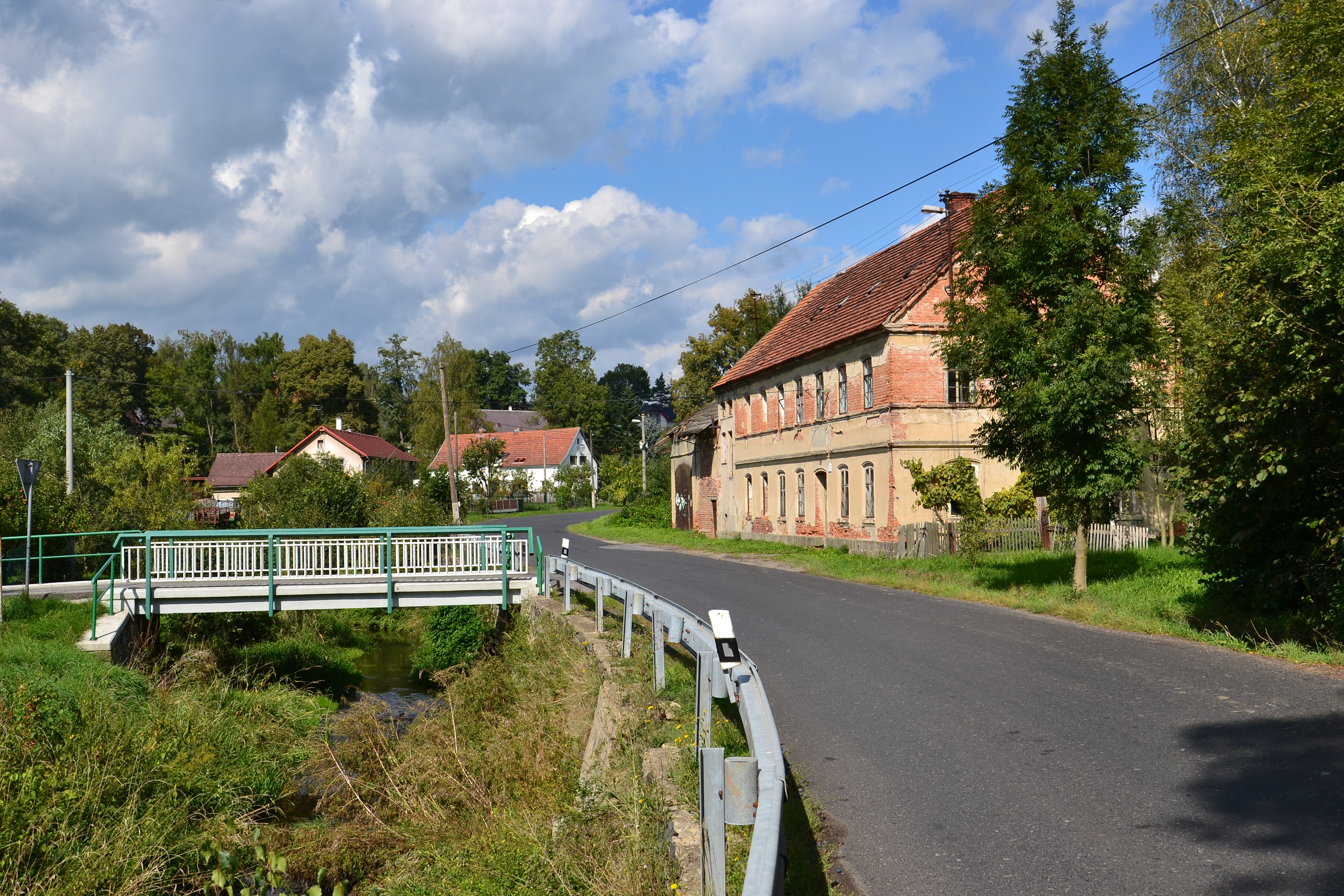
- Northern part of Horní Habartice

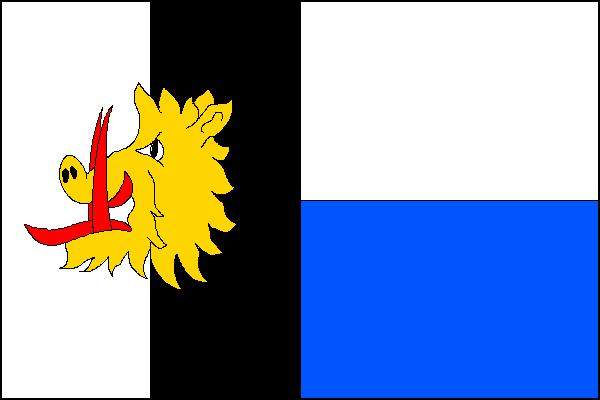
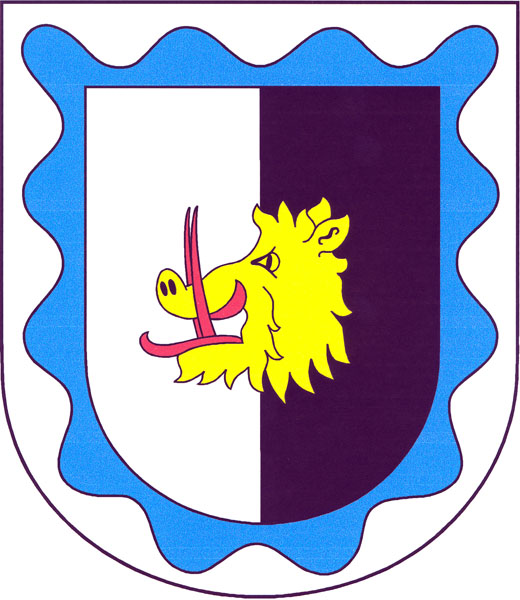
- Flag Coat of arms

- Location in the Czech Republic
- Coordinates: 50°45′44″N 14°20′27″E
- Country: Czech Republic
- Region: Ústí nad Labem
- District: Děčín
- First mentioned: 1281

Area
  - Total: 7.27 km^{2} (2.81 sq mi)
- Elevation: 255 m (837 ft)

Population (2026-01-01)
  - Total: 454
  - Density: 62.4/km^{2} (162/sq mi)
- Time zone: UTC+1 (CET)
  - Summer (DST): UTC+2 (CEST)
- Postal code: 405 02
- Website: www.hornihabartice.cz

Horní Habartice (German: Ober Ebersdorf) is a municipality and village in Děčín District in the Ústí nad Labem Region of the Czech Republic. It has about 500 inhabitants.

Horní Habartice lies approximately 12 kilometres (7 mi) east of Děčín, 25 km (16 mi) north-east of Ústí nad Labem, and 75 km (47 mi) north of Prague.

== Demographics ==
Historical population
Year	Pop.	±%
1869	1,107	—
1880	1,084	−2.1%
1890	1,023	−5.6%
1900	980	−4.2%
1910	917	−6.4%
1921	919	+0.2%
1930	934	+1.6%
1950	535	−42.7%
1961	554	+3.6%
1970	513	−7.4%
1980	453	−11.7%
1991	368	−18.8%
2001	381	+3.5%
2011	393	+3.1%
2021	408	+3.8%
Source: Censuses
