= Starý Šachov =

- Municipality
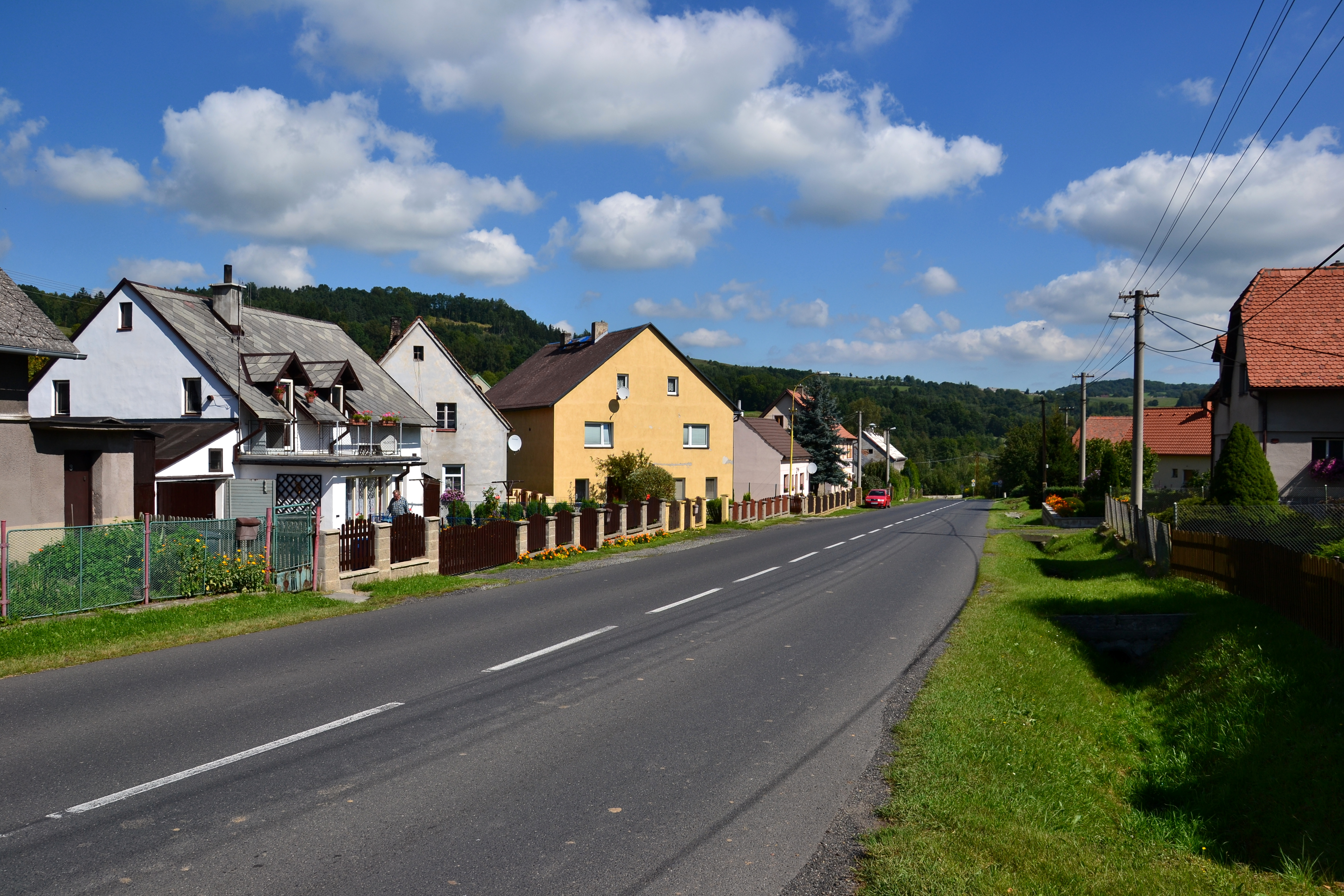
- Malý Šachov, a part of Starý Šachov

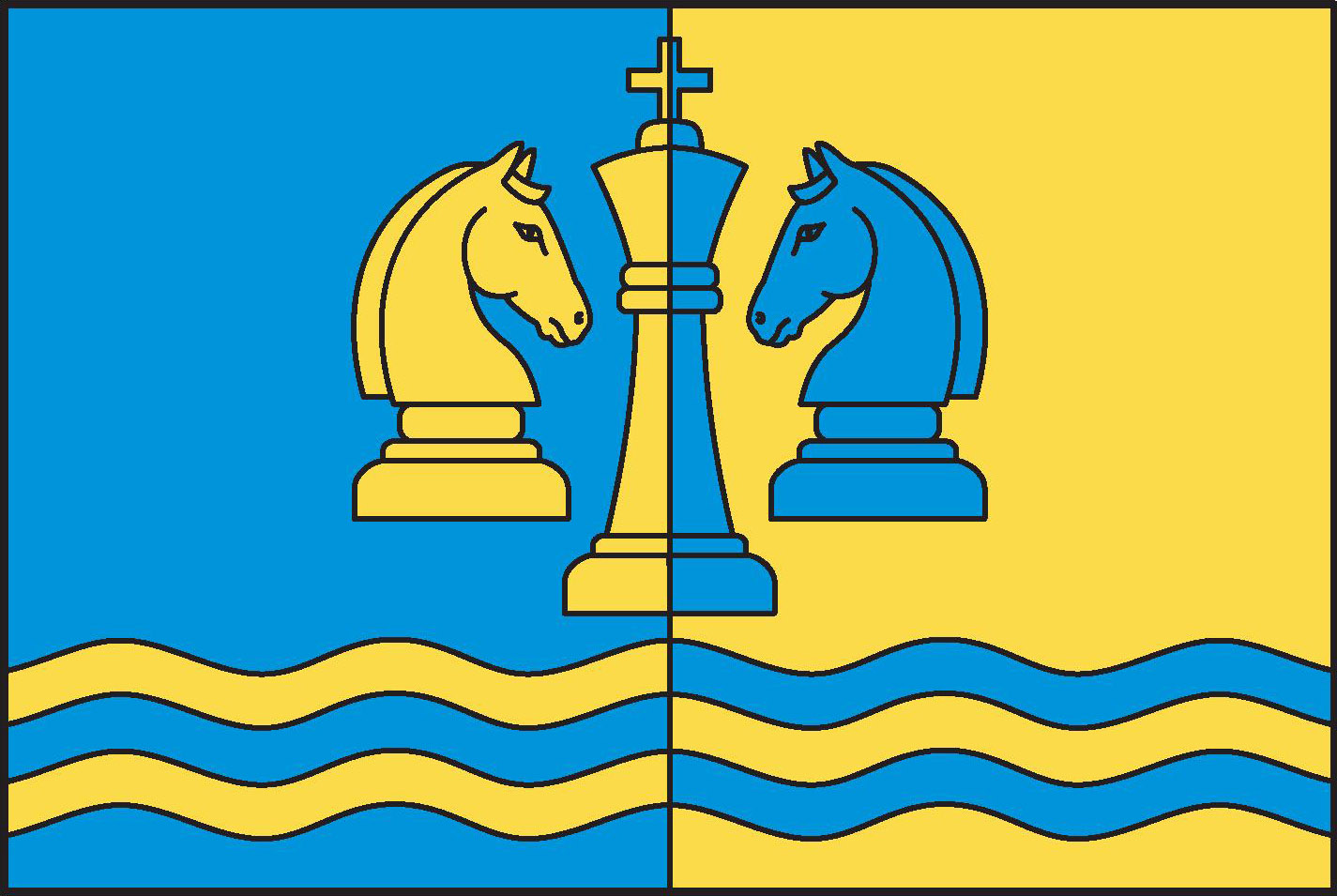
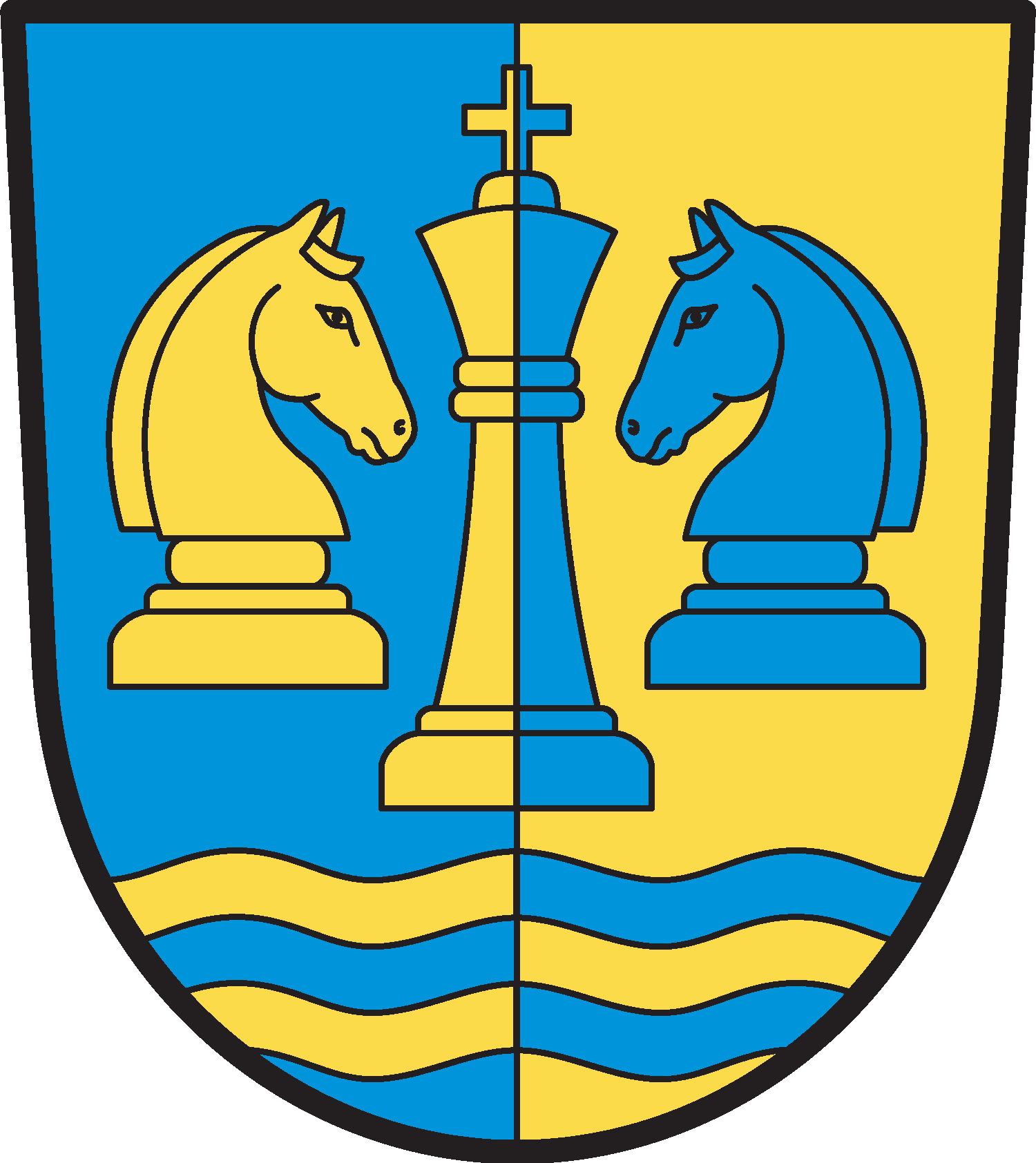
- Flag Coat of arms

- Location in the Czech Republic
- Coordinates: 50°42′55″N 14°21′38″E
- Country: Czech Republic
- Region: Ústí nad Labem
- District: Děčín
- First mentioned: 1387

Area
  - Total: 3.42 km^{2} (1.32 sq mi)
- Elevation: 250 m (820 ft)

Population (2026-01-01)
  - Total: 220
  - Density: 64/km^{2} (170/sq mi)
- Time zone: UTC+1 (CET)
  - Summer (DST): UTC+2 (CEST)
- Postal code: 405 02
- Website: starysachov.cz

Starý Šachov (German: Alt Schokau) is a municipality and village in Děčín District in the Ústí nad Labem Region of the Czech Republic. It has about 200 inhabitants.

Starý Šachov lies approximately 15 kilometres (9 mi) east of Děčín, 25 km (16 mi) east of Ústí nad Labem, and 71 km (44 mi) north of Prague.

== Administrative division ==
Starý Šachov consists of two municipal parts (in brackets population according to the 2021 census):

- Starý Šachov (51)
- Malý Šachov (151)

== Demographics ==
Historical population
Year	Pop.	±%
1869	732	—
1880	628	−14.2%
1890	639	+1.8%
1900	623	−2.5%
1910	614	−1.4%
1921	549	−10.6%
1930	586	+6.7%
1950	373	−36.3%
1961	382	+2.4%
1970	305	−20.2%
1980	244	−20.0%
1991	180	−26.2%
2001	216	+20.0%
2011	207	−4.2%
2021	202	−2.4%
Source: Censuses
