= Merboltice =

- Municipality
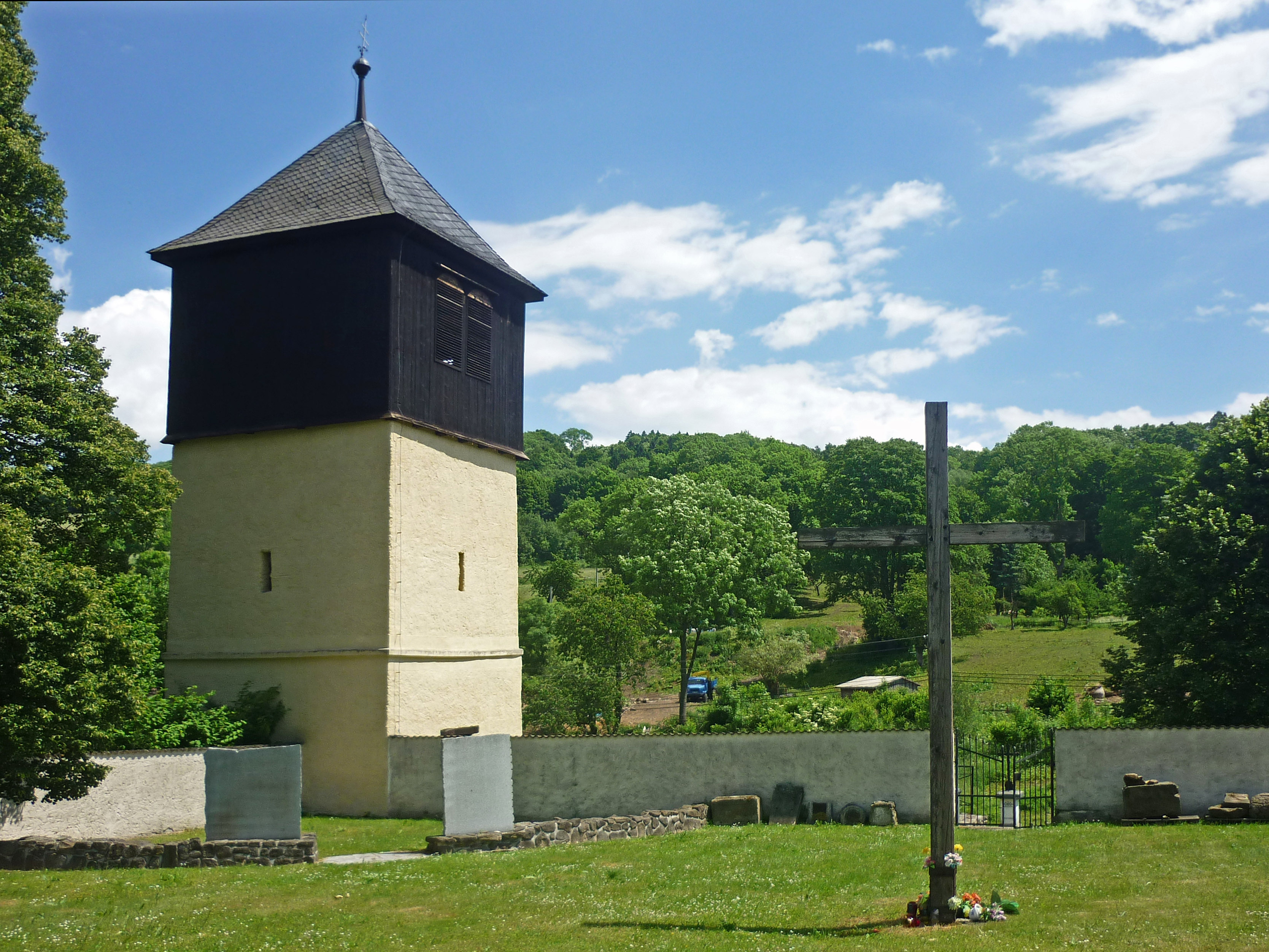
- Belfry in Merboltice

- Flag Coat of arms

- Location in the Czech Republic
- Coordinates: 50°40′59″N 14°20′23″E
- Country: Czech Republic
- Region: Ústí nad Labem
- District: Děčín
- First mentioned: 1352

Area
  - Total: 8.25 km^{2} (3.19 sq mi)
- Elevation: 413 m (1,355 ft)

Population (2026-01-01)
  - Total: 197
  - Density: 23.9/km^{2} (61.8/sq mi)
- Time zone: UTC+1 (CET)
  - Summer (DST): UTC+2 (CEST)
- Postal code: 405 02
- Website: www.merboltice.cz

Merboltice (German: Mertendorf) is a municipality and village in Děčín District in the Ústí nad Labem Region of the Czech Republic. It has about 200 inhabitants.

Merboltice lies approximately 15 kilometres (9 mi) south-east of Děčín, 23 km (14 mi) east of Ústí nad Labem, and 67 km (42 mi) north of Prague.

== Demographics ==
Historical population
Year	Pop.	±%
1869	1,065	—
1880	1,027	−3.6%
1890	958	−6.7%
1900	965	+0.7%
1910	935	−3.1%
1921	875	−6.4%
1930	864	−1.3%
1950	307	−64.5%
1961	269	−12.4%
1970	186	−30.9%
1980	124	−33.3%
1991	97	−21.8%
2001	117	+20.6%
2011	175	+49.6%
2021	215	+22.9%
Source: Censuses
