= Malá Veleň =

- Municipality
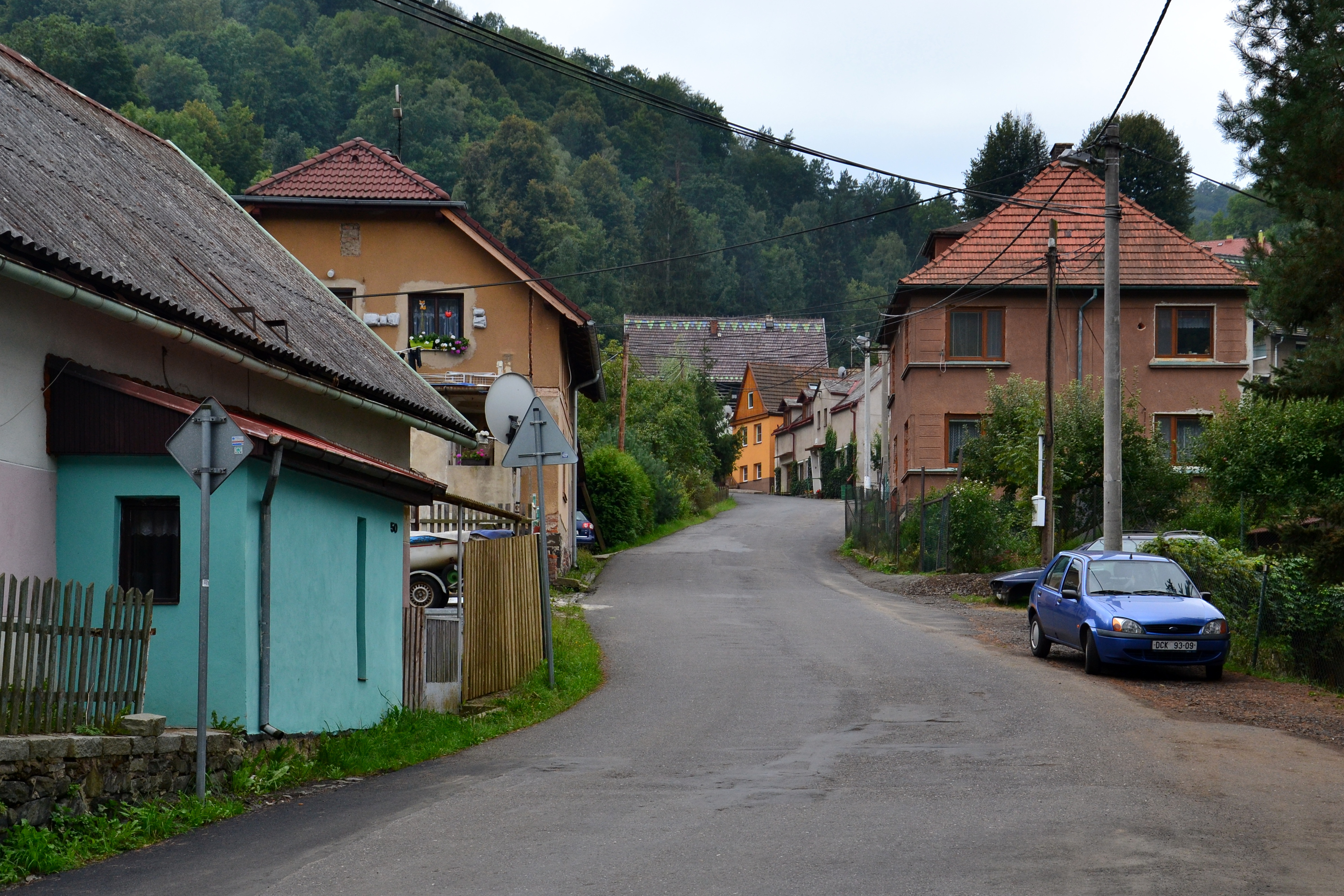
- A street in Malá Veleň

- Location in the Czech Republic
- Coordinates: 50°44′30″N 14°16′15″E
- Country: Czech Republic
- Region: Ústí nad Labem
- District: Děčín
- First mentioned: 1543

Area
  - Total: 5.03 km^{2} (1.94 sq mi)
- Elevation: 205 m (673 ft)

Population (2026-01-01)
  - Total: 440
  - Density: 87/km^{2} (230/sq mi)
- Time zone: UTC+1 (CET)
  - Summer (DST): UTC+2 (CEST)
- Postal code: 405 02
- Website: www.mala-velen.cz

Malá Veleň (German: Klein Wöhlen) is a municipality and village in Děčín District in the Ústí nad Labem Region of the Czech Republic. It has about 400 inhabitants.

Malá Veleň lies approximately 8 kilometres (5 mi) south-east of Děčín, 19 km (12 mi) north-east of Ústí nad Labem, and 74 km (46 mi) north of Prague.

== Administrative division ==
Malá Veleň consists of three municipal parts (in brackets population according to the 2021 census):

- Malá Veleň (212)
- Jedlka (132)
- Soutěsky (120)

== Etymology ==
The name Veleň is derived from the personal name Velen, meaning "Velen's (court)". The prefix malá (i.e. 'small') was added to distinguish it from nearby Velká Veleň ('great Veleň', today a part of Děčín).

== Demographics ==
Historical population
Year	Pop.	±%
1869	786	—
1880	889	+13.1%
1890	932	+4.8%
1900	1,037	+11.3%
1910	1,075	+3.7%
1921	975	−9.3%
1930	1,130	+15.9%
1950	591	−47.7%
1961	601	+1.7%
1970	584	−2.8%
1980	406	−30.5%
1991	405	−0.2%
2001	418	+3.2%
2011	437	+4.5%
2021	464	+6.2%
Source: Censuses
