= Kámen (Děčín District) =

- Municipality
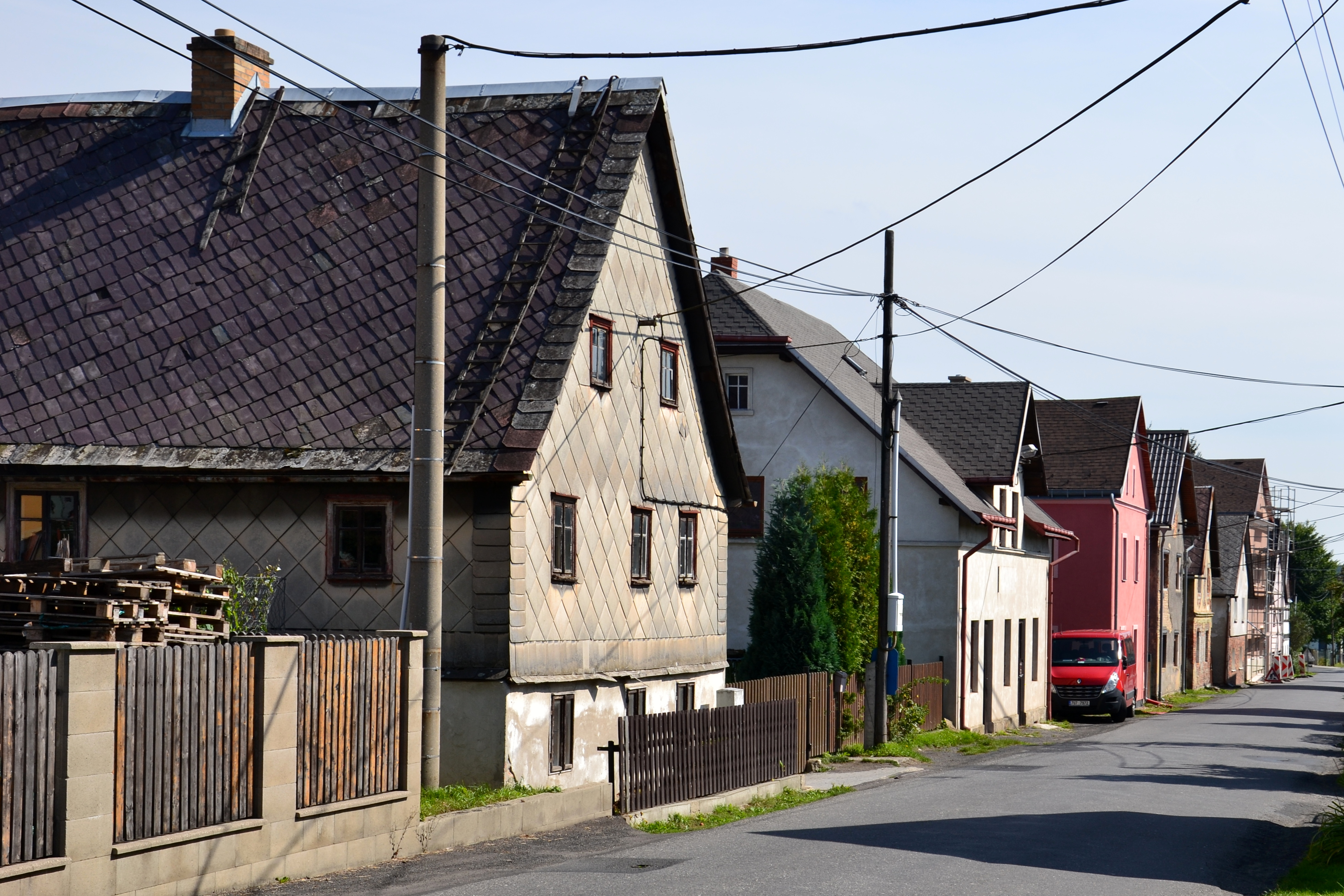
- Houses in the centre of Kámen

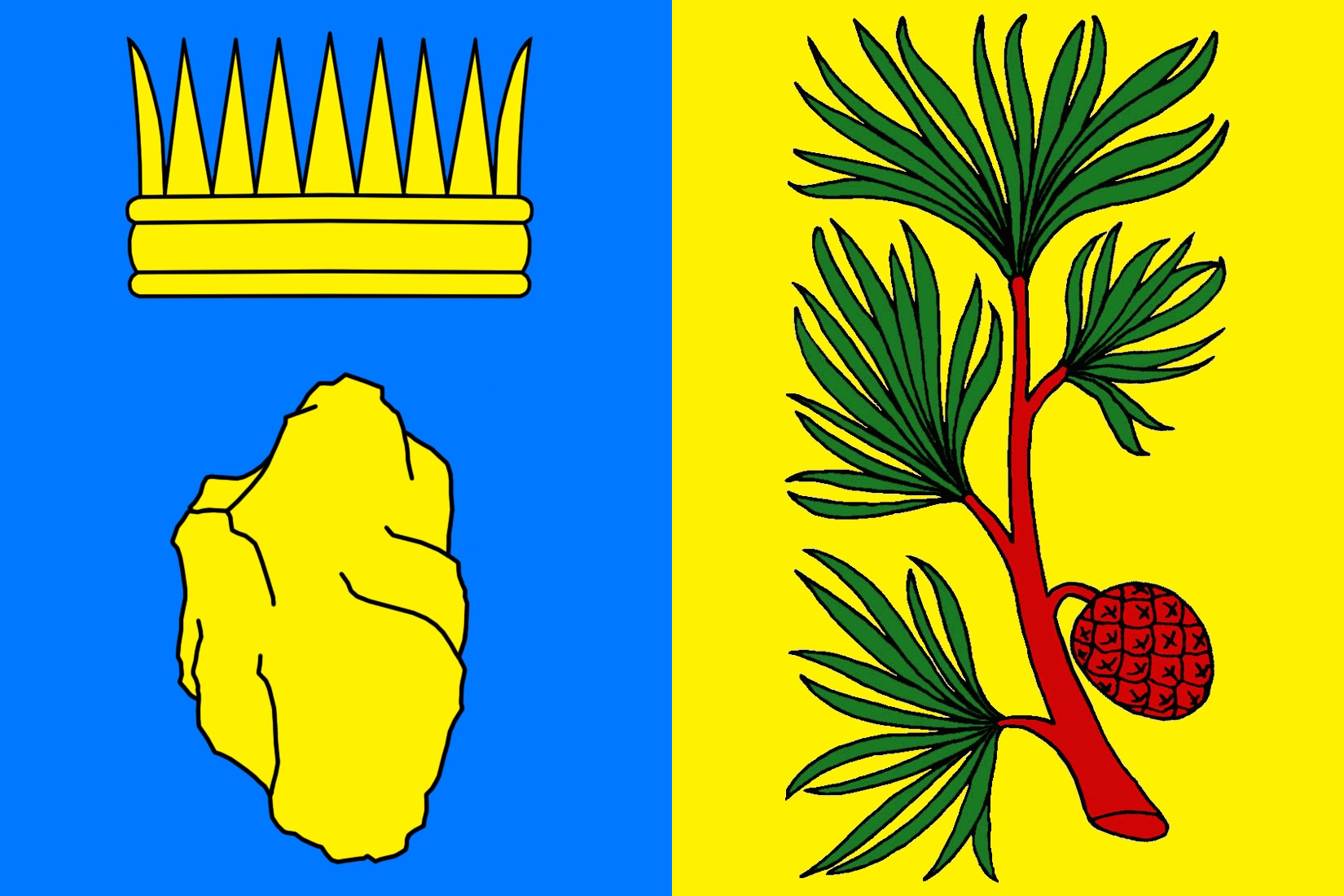
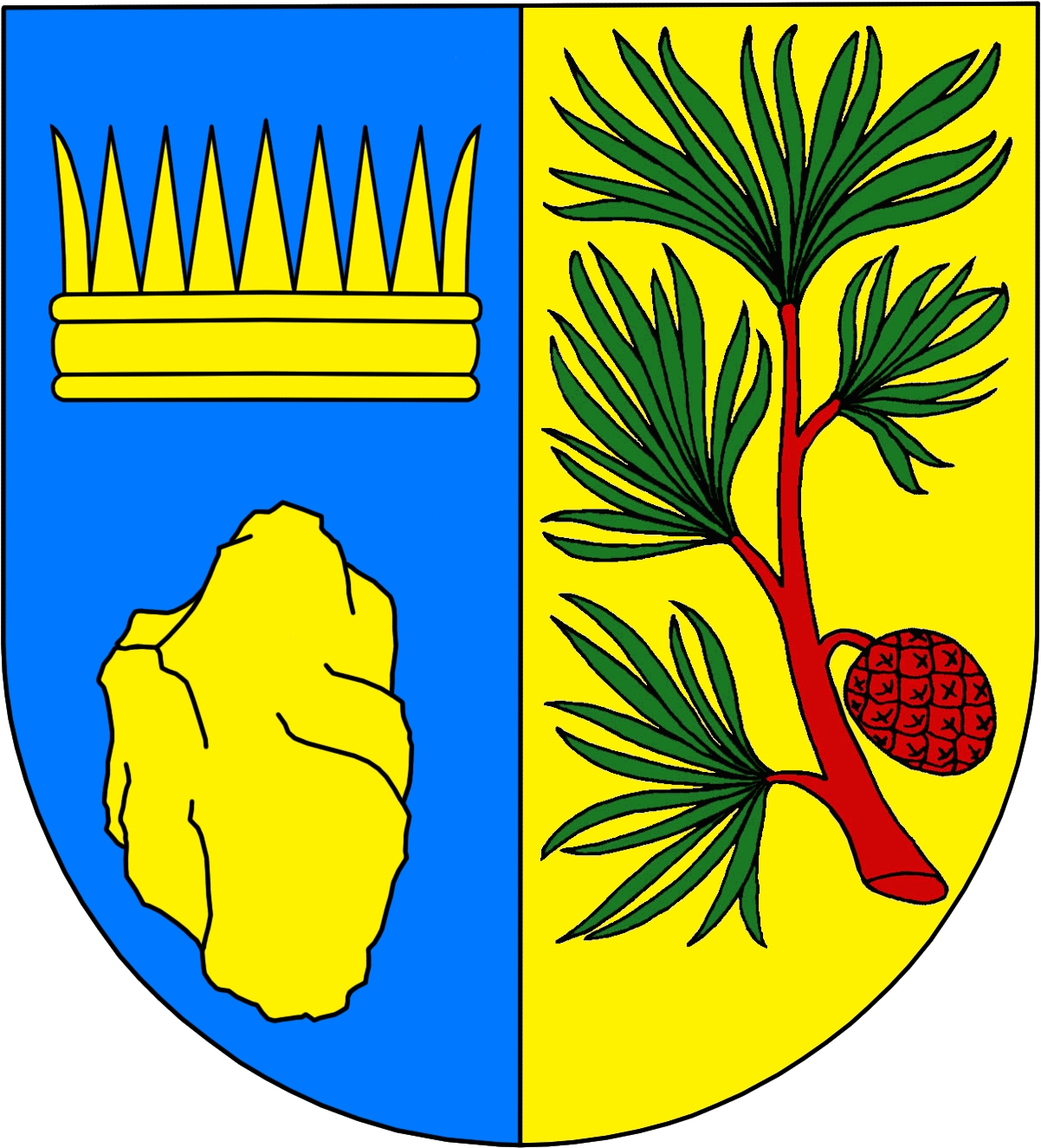
- Flag Coat of arms

- Location in the Czech Republic
- Coordinates: 50°48′37″N 14°16′7″E
- Country: Czech Republic
- Region: Ústí nad Labem
- District: Děčín
- First mentioned: 1720

Area
  - Total: 1.78 km^{2} (0.69 sq mi)
- Elevation: 337 m (1,106 ft)

Population (2026-01-01)
  - Total: 259
  - Density: 146/km^{2} (377/sq mi)
- Time zone: UTC+1 (CET)
  - Summer (DST): UTC+2 (CEST)
- Postal code: 407 13
- Website: www.kamen-obec.cz

Kámen (German: Heidenstein) is a municipality and village in Děčín District in the Ústí nad Labem Region of the Czech Republic. It has about 300 inhabitants.

Kámen lies approximately 8 kilometres (5 mi) north-east of Děčín, 23 km (14 mi) north-east of Ústí nad Labem, and 81 km (50 mi) north of Prague.

== Demographics ==
Historical population
Year	Pop.	±%
1869	354	—
1880	373	+5.4%
1890	359	−3.8%
1900	333	−7.2%
1910	336	+0.9%
1921	355	+5.7%
1930	359	+1.1%
1950	216	−39.8%
1961	251	+16.2%
1970	213	−15.1%
1980	188	−11.7%
1991	145	−22.9%
2001	154	+6.2%
2011	191	+24.0%
2021	259	+35.6%
Source: Censuses
