= Bynovec =

- Municipality
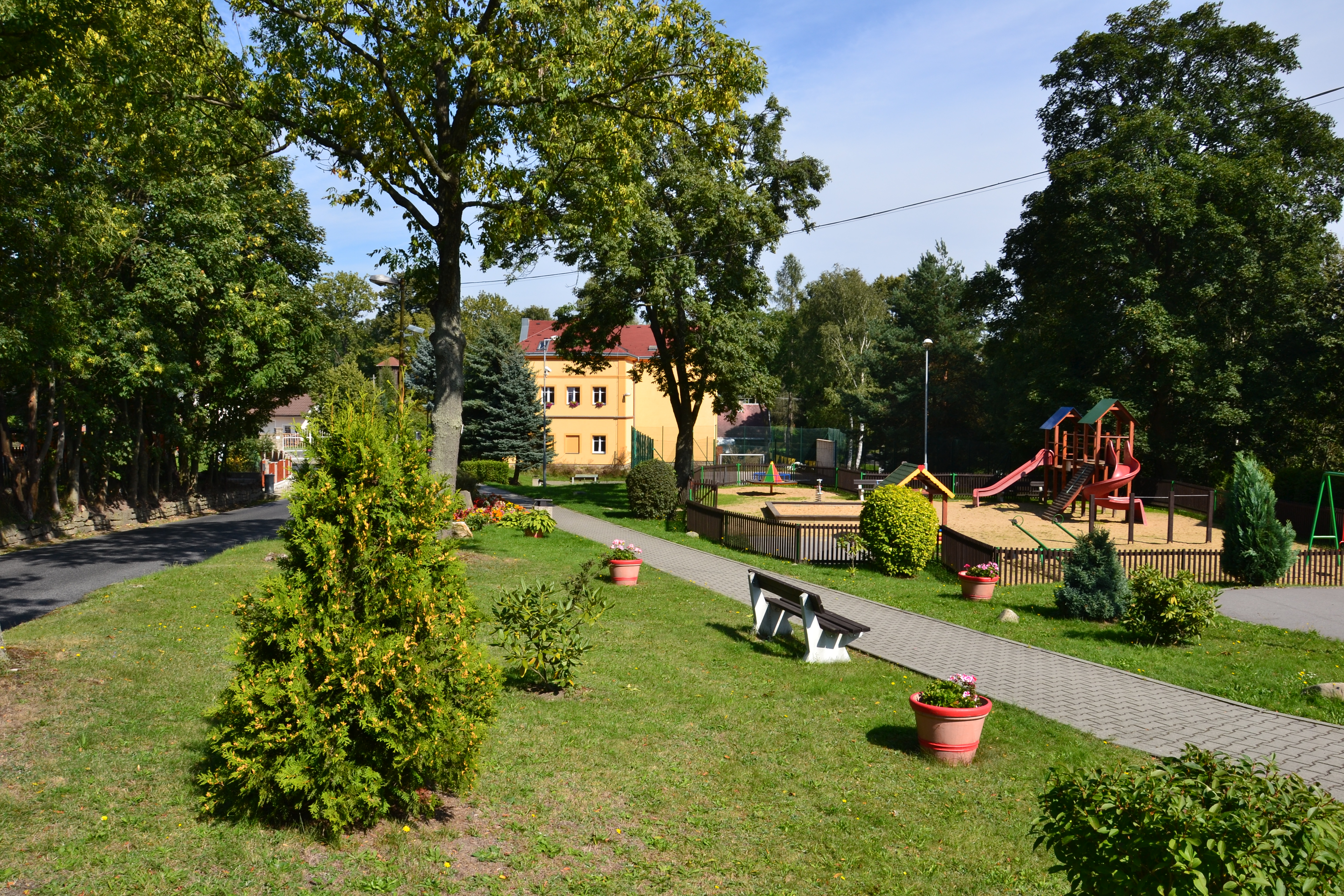
- Centre of Bynovec

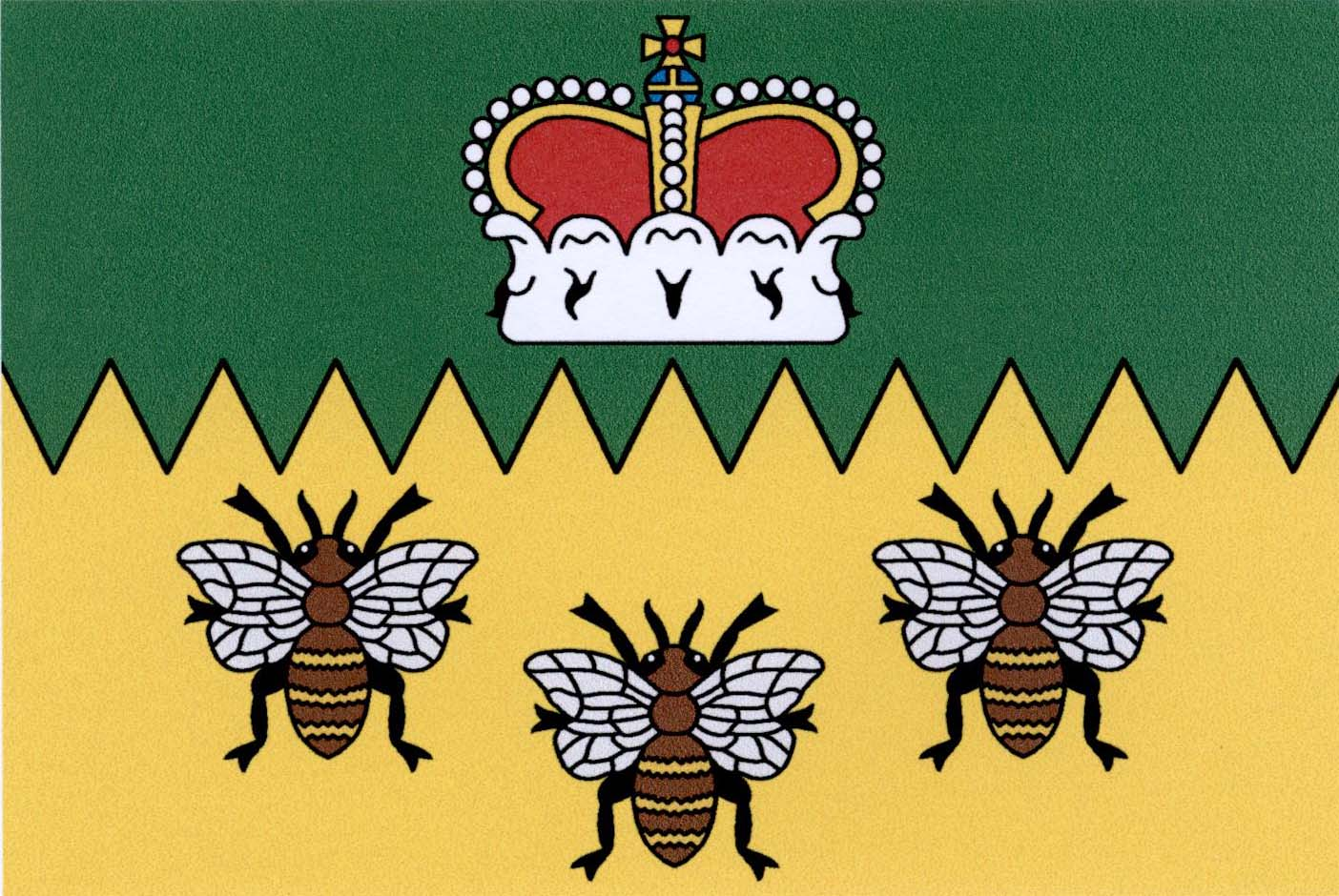
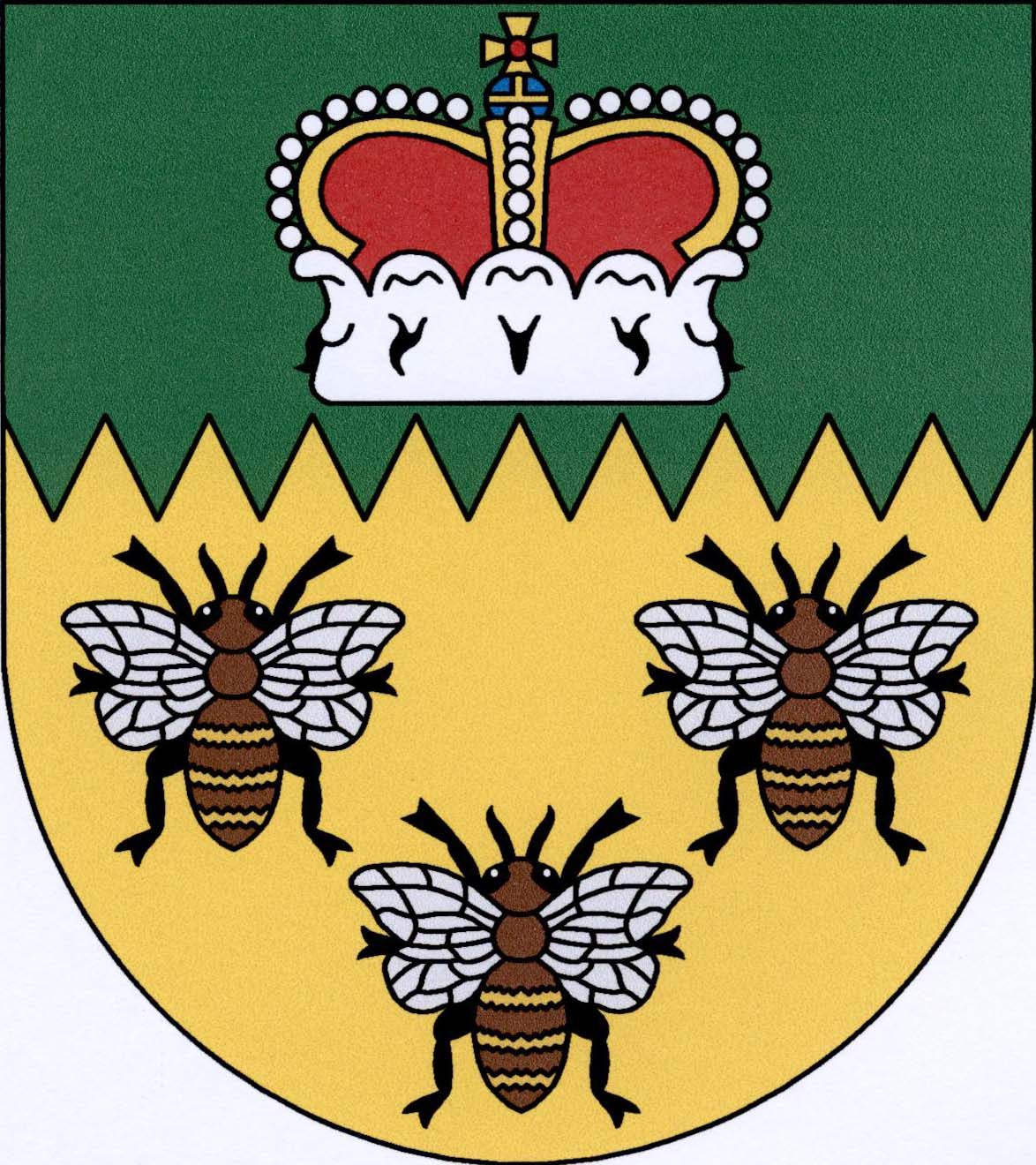
- Flag Coat of arms

- Location in the Czech Republic
- Coordinates: 50°49′15″N 14°15′51″E
- Country: Czech Republic
- Region: Ústí nad Labem
- District: Děčín
- First mentioned: 1543

Area
  - Total: 6.37 km^{2} (2.46 sq mi)
- Elevation: 379 m (1,243 ft)

Population (2026-01-01)
  - Total: 346
  - Density: 54.3/km^{2} (141/sq mi)
- Time zone: UTC+1 (CET)
  - Summer (DST): UTC+2 (CEST)
- Postal code: 405 02
- Website: www.bynovec.cz

Bynovec (German: Binsdorf) is a municipality and village in Děčín District in the Ústí nad Labem Region of the Czech Republic. It has about 300 inhabitants.

Bynovec lies approximately 9 kilometres (6 mi) north-east of Děčín, 25 km (16 mi) north-east of Ústí nad Labem, and 83 km (52 mi) north of Prague.

== Demographics ==
Historical population
Year	Pop.	±%
1869	613	—
1880	620	+1.1%
1890	625	+0.8%
1900	608	−2.7%
1910	610	+0.3%
1921	523	−14.3%
1930	529	+1.1%
1950	302	−42.9%
1961	286	−5.3%
1970	275	−3.8%
1980	216	−21.5%
1991	215	−0.5%
2001	223	+3.7%
2011	287	+28.7%
2021	335	+16.7%
Source: Censuses
