= Dolní Habartice =

- Municipality
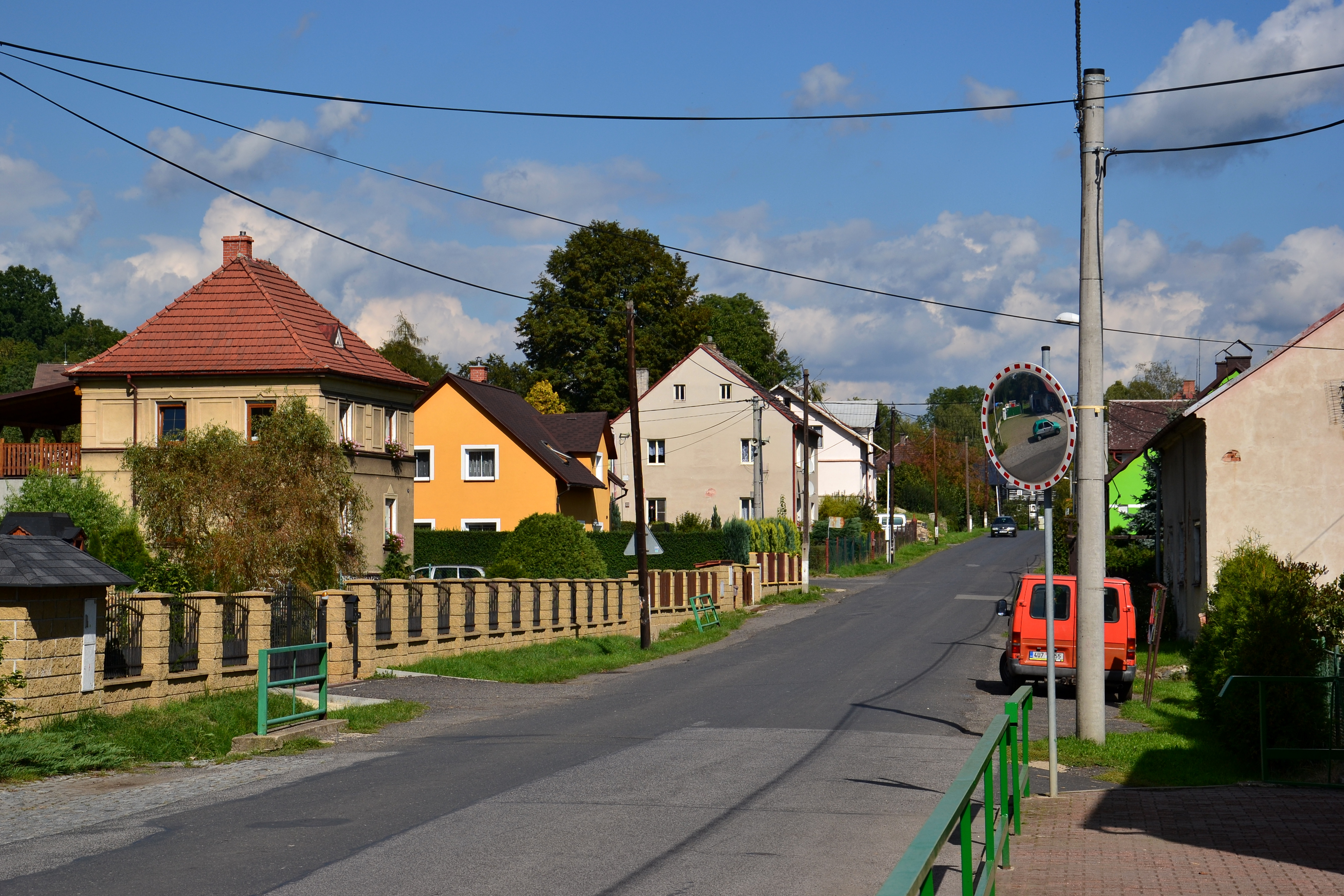
- Main street

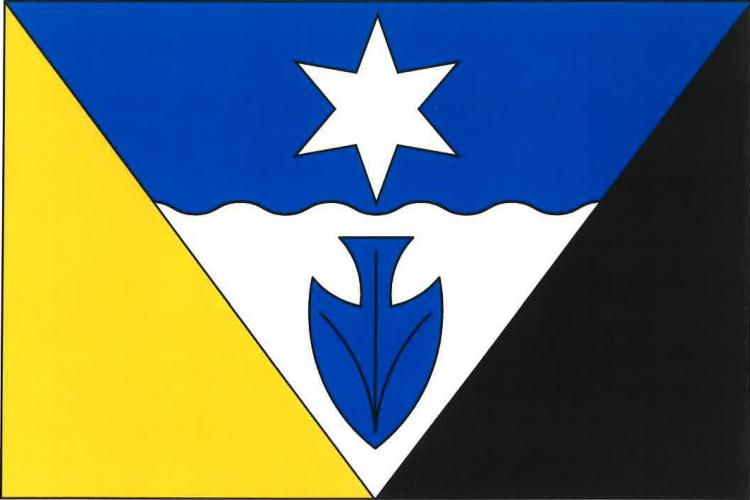
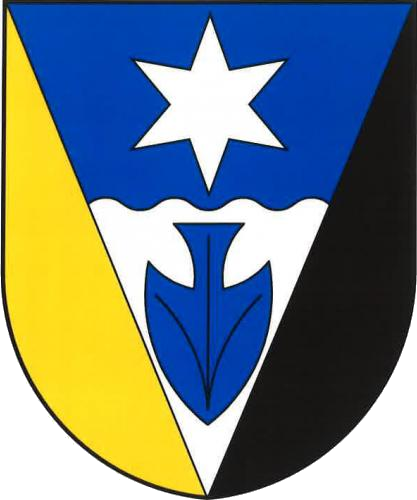
- Flag Coat of arms

- Location in the Czech Republic
- Coordinates: 50°44′50″N 14°20′0″E
- Country: Czech Republic
- Region: Ústí nad Labem
- District: Děčín
- First mentioned: 1281

Area
  - Total: 5.57 km^{2} (2.15 sq mi)
- Elevation: 227 m (745 ft)

Population (2026-01-01)
  - Total: 603
  - Density: 108/km^{2} (280/sq mi)
- Time zone: UTC+1 (CET)
  - Summer (DST): UTC+2 (CEST)
- Postal code: 405 02
- Website: www.dolni-habartice.cz

Dolní Habartice (German: Nieder Ebersdorf) is a municipality and village in Děčín District in the Ústí nad Labem Region of the Czech Republic. It has about 600 inhabitants.

Dolní Habartice lies approximately 12 kilometres (7 mi) east of Děčín, 23 km (14 mi) north-east of Ústí nad Labem, and 74 km (46 mi) north of Prague.

== Demographics ==
Historical population
Year	Pop.	±%
1869	957	—
1880	994	+3.9%
1890	1,112	+11.9%
1900	1,168	+5.0%
1910	1,289	+10.4%
1921	1,175	−8.8%
1930	1,186	+0.9%
1950	689	−41.9%
1961	690	+0.1%
1970	624	−9.6%
1980	572	−8.3%
1991	508	−11.2%
2001	563	+10.8%
2011	549	−2.5%
2021	559	+1.8%
Source: Censuses
