= Dobkovice =

- Municipality
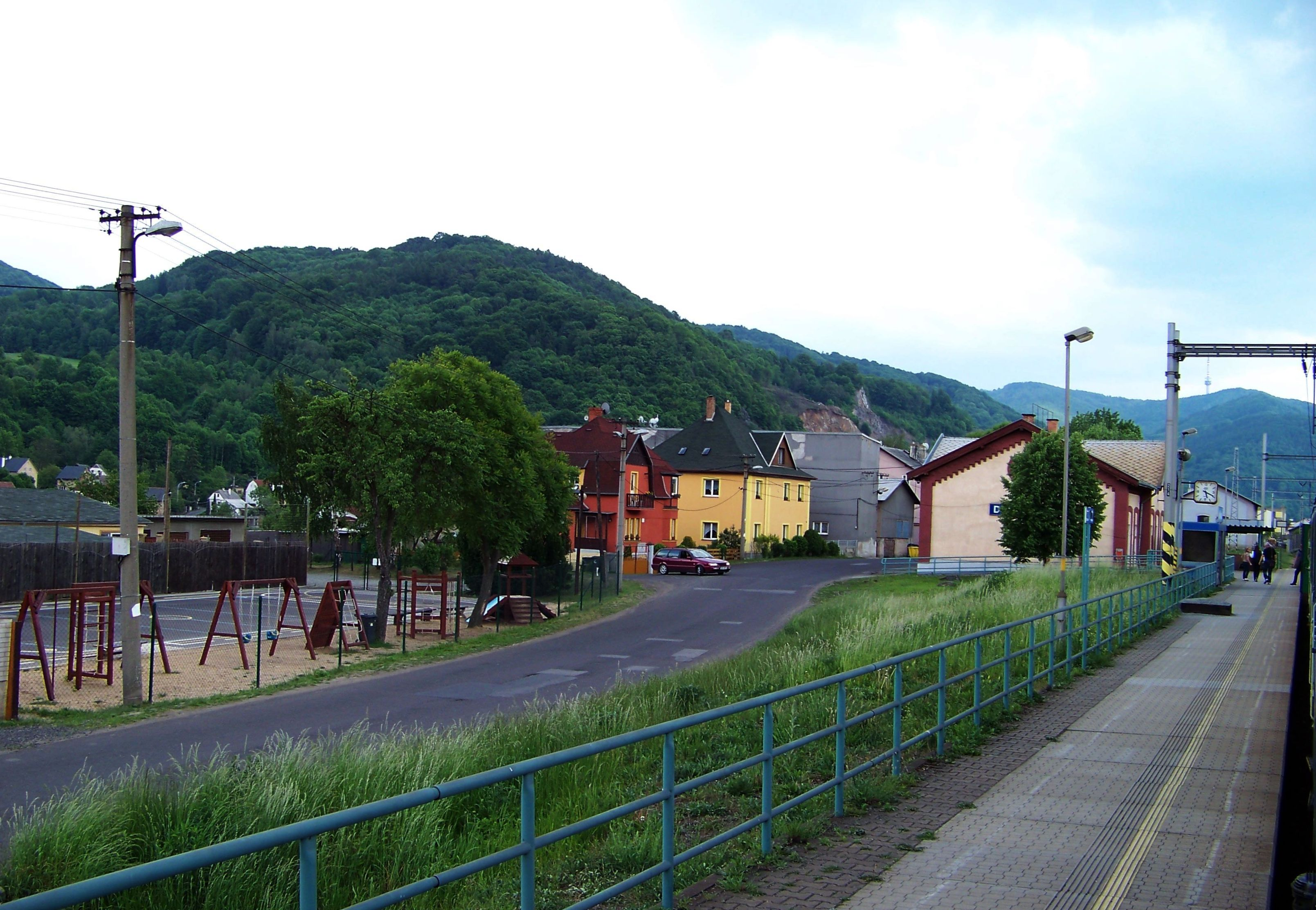
- Train station and its surroundings

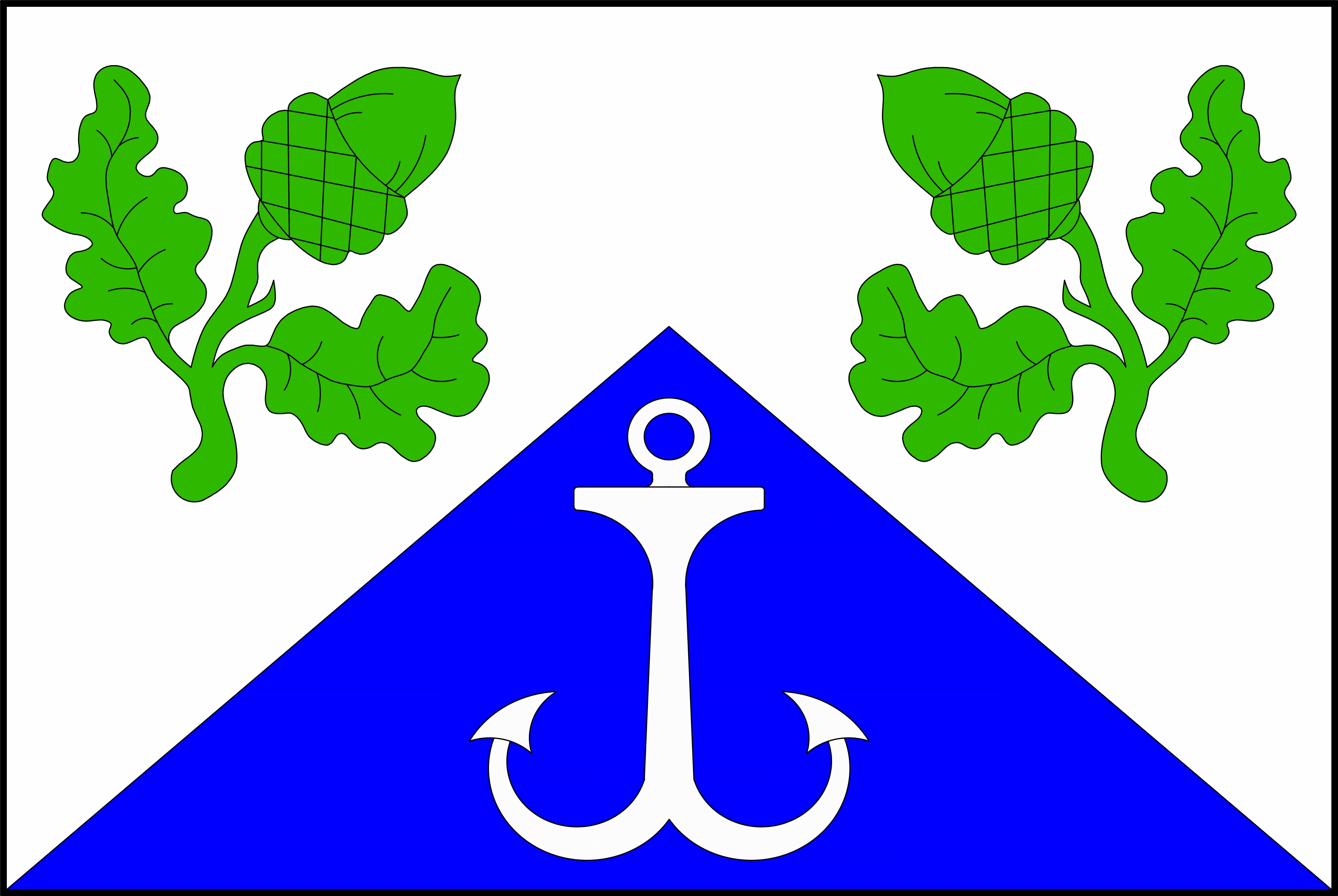
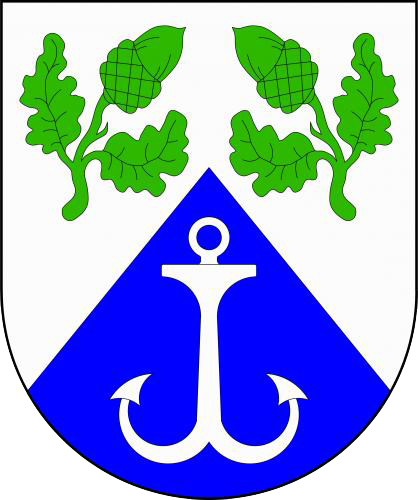
- Flag Coat of arms

- Location in the Czech Republic
- Coordinates: 50°42′54″N 14°11′36″E
- Country: Czech Republic
- Region: Ústí nad Labem
- District: Děčín
- First mentioned: 1383

Area
  - Total: 5.75 km^{2} (2.22 sq mi)
- Elevation: 150 m (490 ft)

Population (2026-01-01)
  - Total: 645
  - Density: 112/km^{2} (291/sq mi)
- Time zone: UTC+1 (CET)
  - Summer (DST): UTC+2 (CEST)
- Postal code: 407 03
- Website: www.dobkovice.cz

Dobkovice (German: Topkowitz) is a municipality and village in Děčín District in the Ústí nad Labem Region of the Czech Republic. It has about 600 inhabitants. It lies on the Elbe River.

Dobkovice lies approximately 7 kilometres (4 mi) south of Děčín, 12 km (7 mi) north-east of Ústí nad Labem, and 71 km (44 mi) north of Prague.

== Administrative division ==
Dobkovice consists of three municipal parts (in brackets population according to the 2021 census):

- Dobkovice (551)
- Poustka (2)
- Prosetín (82)

== Demographics ==
Historical population
Year	Pop.	±%
1869	543	—
1880	581	+7.0%
1890	724	+24.6%
1900	942	+30.1%
1910	1,023	+8.6%
1921	873	−14.7%
1930	875	+0.2%
1950	499	−43.0%
1961	513	+2.8%
1970	707	+37.8%
1980	799	+13.0%
1991	632	−20.9%
2001	650	+2.8%
2011	631	−2.9%
2021	635	+0.6%
Source: Censuses
