= Děčín District =

Děčín District Okres Děčín
- District
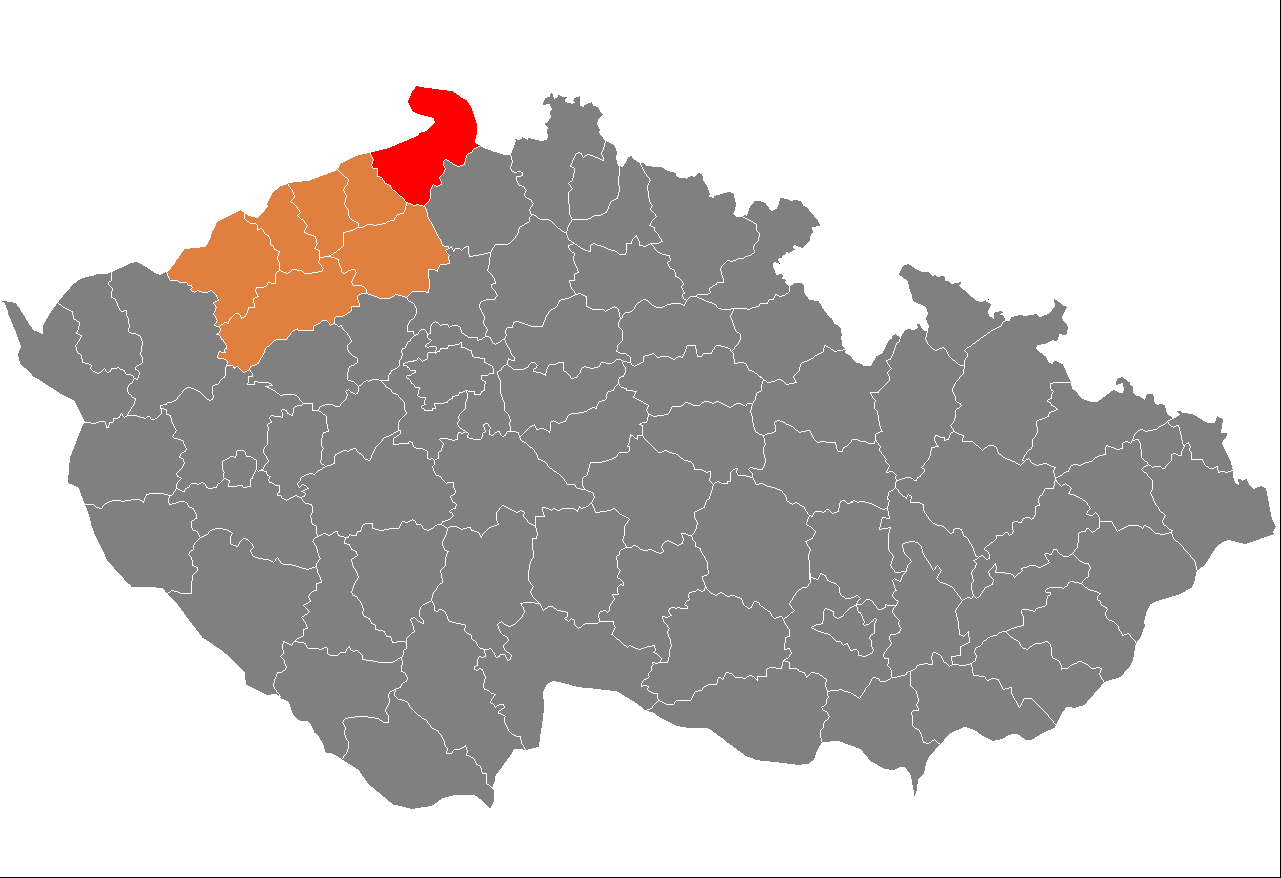
- Location in the Ústí nad Labem Region within the Czech Republic

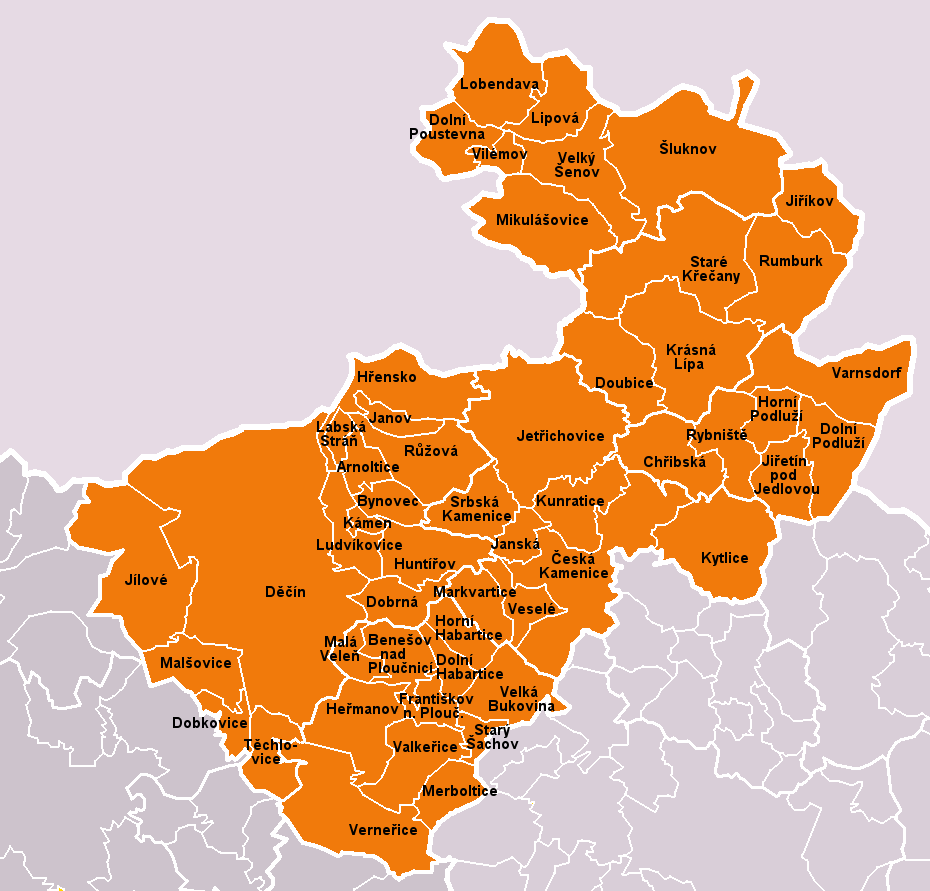
- Coordinates: 50°51′N 14°23′E
- Country: Czech Republic
- Region: Ústí nad Labem
- Capital: Děčín

Area
  - Total: 908.84 km^{2} (350.91 sq mi)

Population (2026)
  - Total: 124,991
  - Density: 137.53/km^{2} (356.20/sq mi)
- Time zone: UTC+1 (CET)
  - Summer (DST): UTC+2 (CEST)
- Municipalities: 52
- * Cities and towns: 14
- * Market towns: 0

Děčín District (Czech: okres Děčín) is a district in the Ústí nad Labem Region of the Czech Republic. Its capital is the city of Děčín.

== Administrative division ==
Děčín District is divided into three administrative districts of municipalities with extended competence: Děčín, Rumburk and Varnsdorf.

=== List of municipalities ===
Cities and towns are marked in bold:

Arnoltice - Benešov nad Ploučnicí - Bynovec - Česká Kamenice - Děčín - Dobkovice - Dobrná - Dolní Habartice - Dolní Podluží - Dolní Poustevna - Doubice - Františkov nad Ploučnicí - Heřmanov - Horní Habartice - Horní Podluží - Hřensko - Huntířov - Chřibská - Janov - Janská - Jetřichovice - Jílové - Jiřetín pod Jedlovou - Jiříkov - Kámen - Krásná Lípa - Kunratice - Kytlice - Labská Stráň - Lipová - Lobendava - Ludvíkovice - Malá Veleň - Malšovice - Markvartice - Merboltice - Mikulášovice - Rumburk - Růžová - Rybniště - Srbská Kamenice - Staré Křečany - Starý Šachov - Šluknov - Těchlovice - Valkeřice - Varnsdorf - Velká Bukovina - Velký Šenov - Verneřice - Veselé - Vilémov

== Geography ==
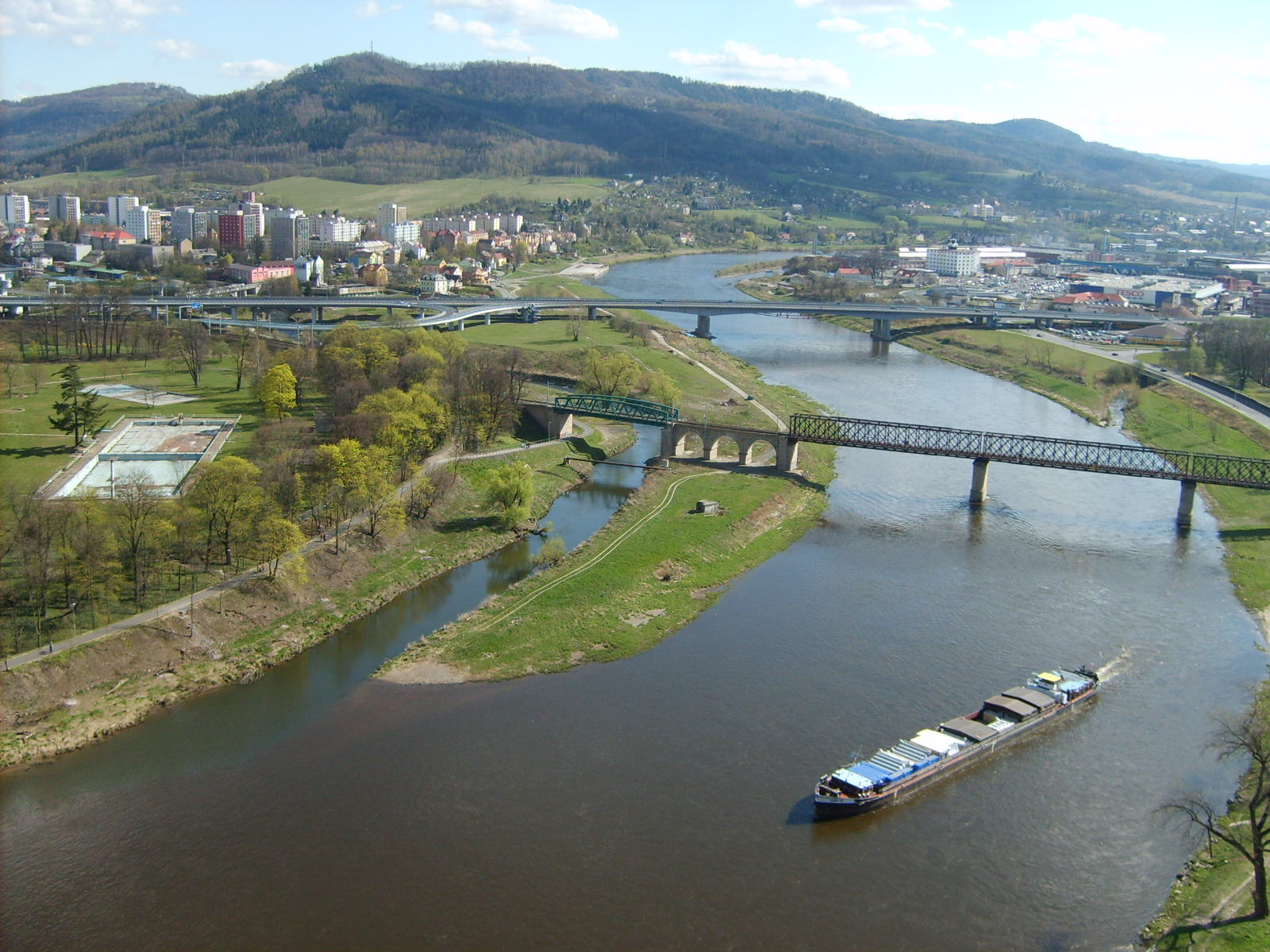
Confluence of the Elbe and Ploučnice in Děčín

Děčín District borders Germany in the north. It includes the Šluknov Hook area, surrounded by Germany on three sides. The district is a hilly and above-average forested area with several valleys and canyons. The territory extends into four geomorphological mesoregions: Elbe Sandstone Mountains (northwest), Central Bohemian Uplands (south), Lusatian Mountains (east) and Lusatian Highlands (north). The highest point of the district is the mountain Pěnkavčí vrch in Dolní Podluží with an elevation of 792 m (2,598 ft), located on the district border. The lowest point, which is also the lowest point of the entire Czech Republic, is the river bed of the Elbe in Hřensko at 115 m (377 ft).

From the total district area of 908.8 km^{2} (350.9 sq mi), agricultural land occupies 361.9 km^{2} (139.7 sq mi), forests occupy 454.5 km^{2} (175.5 sq mi), and water area occupies 10.5 km^{2} (4.1 sq mi). Forests cover 50.0% of the district's area.

The territory is rich in rivers. The most important river is the Elbe, which flows through the west of the territory and continues to Germany. Its most important tributary is the Ploučnice. Other notable rivers are the Kamenice, Křinice, Sebnice, and Mandava. The Spree shortly forms the Czech–German border.

There are only a few bodies of water in the district. The largest of them is the fishpond Velký rybník with an area of 36 ha (89 acres).

Most of the Děčín District is protected within some of large-scale protected areas. The most significant is Bohemian Switzerland National Park with many famous natural monuments. The protected landscape areas of České středohoří, Labské pískovce and Lužické hory also extend into the district.

== Demographics ==
Historical population

Year	Pop.	±%
1869	174,262	—
1880	186,961	+7.3%
1890	197,309	+5.5%
1900	213,629	+8.3%
1910	233,066	+9.1%

Year	Pop.	±%
1921	213,164	−8.5%
1930	231,859	+8.8%
1950	131,279	−43.4%
1961	131,956	+0.5%
1970	132,429	+0.4%

Year	Pop.	±%
1980	138,093	+4.3%
1991	133,448	−3.4%
2001	133,887	+0.3%
2011	128,834	−3.8%
2021	124,026	−3.7%

Source: Censuses

=== Most populous municipalities ===
Name	Population	Area (km^{2})
Děčín	46,003	118
Varnsdorf	14,645	26
Rumburk	10,780	25
Šluknov	5,569	47
Česká Kamenice	4,984	39
Jílové	4,891	37
Benešov nad Ploučnicí	3,485	10
Jiříkov	3,472	13
Krásná Lípa	3,296	31
Mikulášovice	2,060	26

== Economy ==
The largest employers with headquarters in Děčín District and at least 500 employees are:

Economic entity	Location	Number of employees	Main activity
ČEZ Distribuce	Děčín	4,000–4,999	Distribution of electricity
Chart Ferox	Děčín	500–999	Manufacture of gas storage systems
City of Děčín	Děčín	500–999	Public administration
Constellium Extrusions Děčín	Děčín	500–999	Manufacture of aluminium products
DS Smith Packaging Czech Republic	Jílové	500–999	Manufacture of paper packaging
Benteler Automotive Rumburk	Rumburk	500–999	Automotive industry

== Transport ==
There are no motorways in the district territory. The most important road that passes through the district is the I/13 (part of the European route E442) from Liberec to Karlovy Vary.

Děčín District is an important junction. An important railway line from Prague to Dresden runs through it. The Elbe is used for ship transport.

== Sights ==
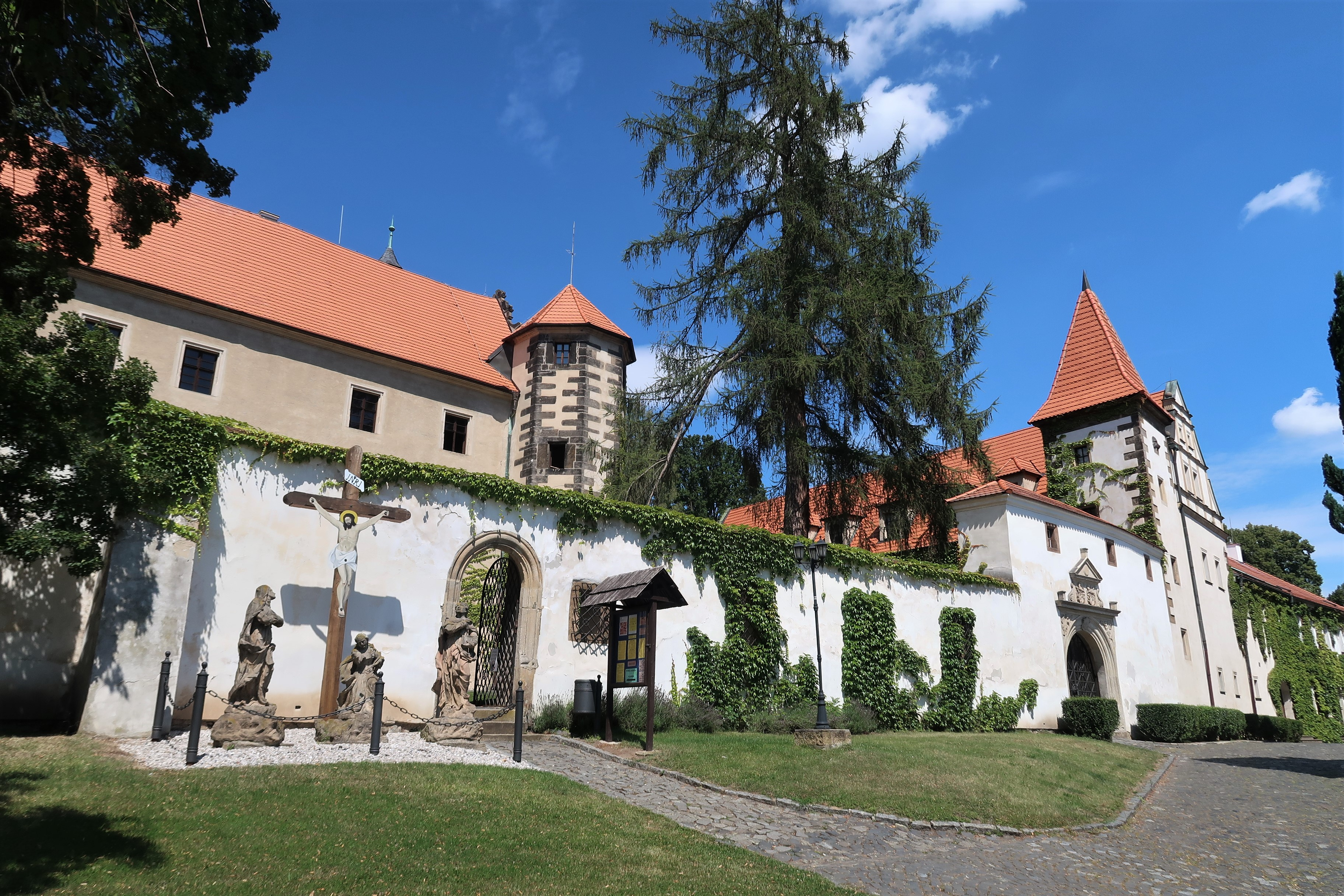
Benešov nad Ploučnicí Castle

The most important monument in the district and the only one protected as a national cultural monument is Benešov nad Ploučnicí Castle.

The best-preserved settlements and localities, protected as monument reservations and monument zones, are:

- Rumburk – Šmilovského Street (monument reservation)
- Benešov nad Ploučnicí
- Česká Kamenice
- Jiřetín pod Jedlovou
- Šluknov
- Dlouhý Důl
- Kamenická Stráň
- Merboltice
- Vysoká Lípa

The most visited tourist destinations are the Děčín Zoo and places in Bohemian Switzerland, which are also among the most visited nature tourist destinations in the entire country: Kamenice Gorge, Pravčická brána, and Jetřichovice Rocks.
