= Markvartice (Děčín District) =

- Municipality
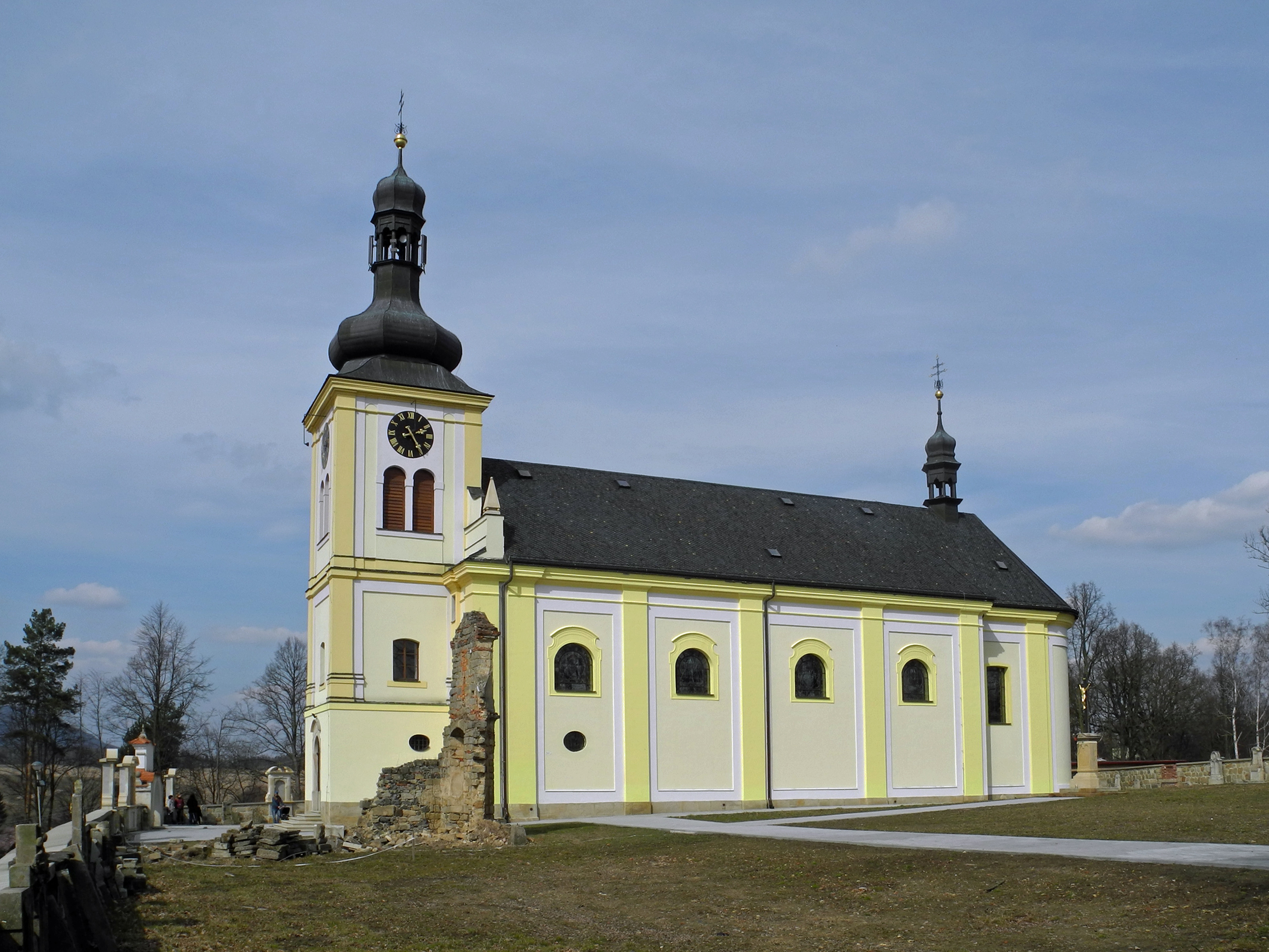
- Church of Saint Martin

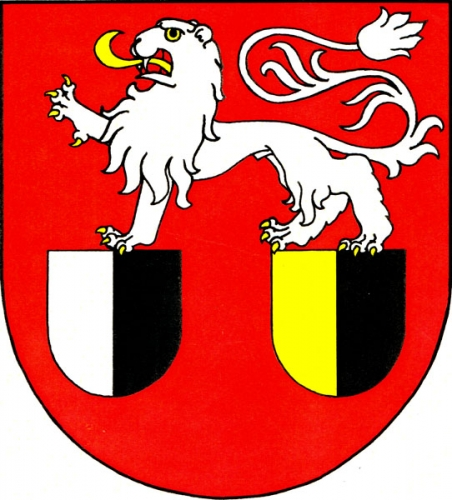
- Flag Coat of arms

- Location in the Czech Republic
- Coordinates: 50°46′32″N 14°21′19″E
- Country: Czech Republic
- Region: Ústí nad Labem
- District: Děčín
- First mentioned: 1281

Area
  - Total: 8.55 km^{2} (3.30 sq mi)
- Elevation: 250 m (820 ft)

Population (2026-01-01)
  - Total: 739
  - Density: 86.4/km^{2} (224/sq mi)
- Time zone: UTC+1 (CET)
  - Summer (DST): UTC+2 (CEST)
- Postal code: 407 42
- Website: www.markvartice.cz

Markvartice (German: Markersdorf) is a municipality and village in Děčín District in the Ústí nad Labem Region of the Czech Republic. It has about 700 inhabitants.

== Demographics ==
Historical population
Year	Pop.	±%
1869	1,976	—
1880	1,878	−5.0%
1890	1,760	−6.3%
1900	1,263	−28.2%
1910	1,203	−4.8%
1921	1,146	−4.7%
1930	1,322	+15.4%
1950	657	−50.3%
1961	632	−3.8%
1970	620	−1.9%
1980	658	+6.1%
1991	578	−12.2%
2001	626	+8.3%
2011	647	+3.4%
2021	692	+7.0%
Source: Censuses
