= Arnoltice =

- Municipality
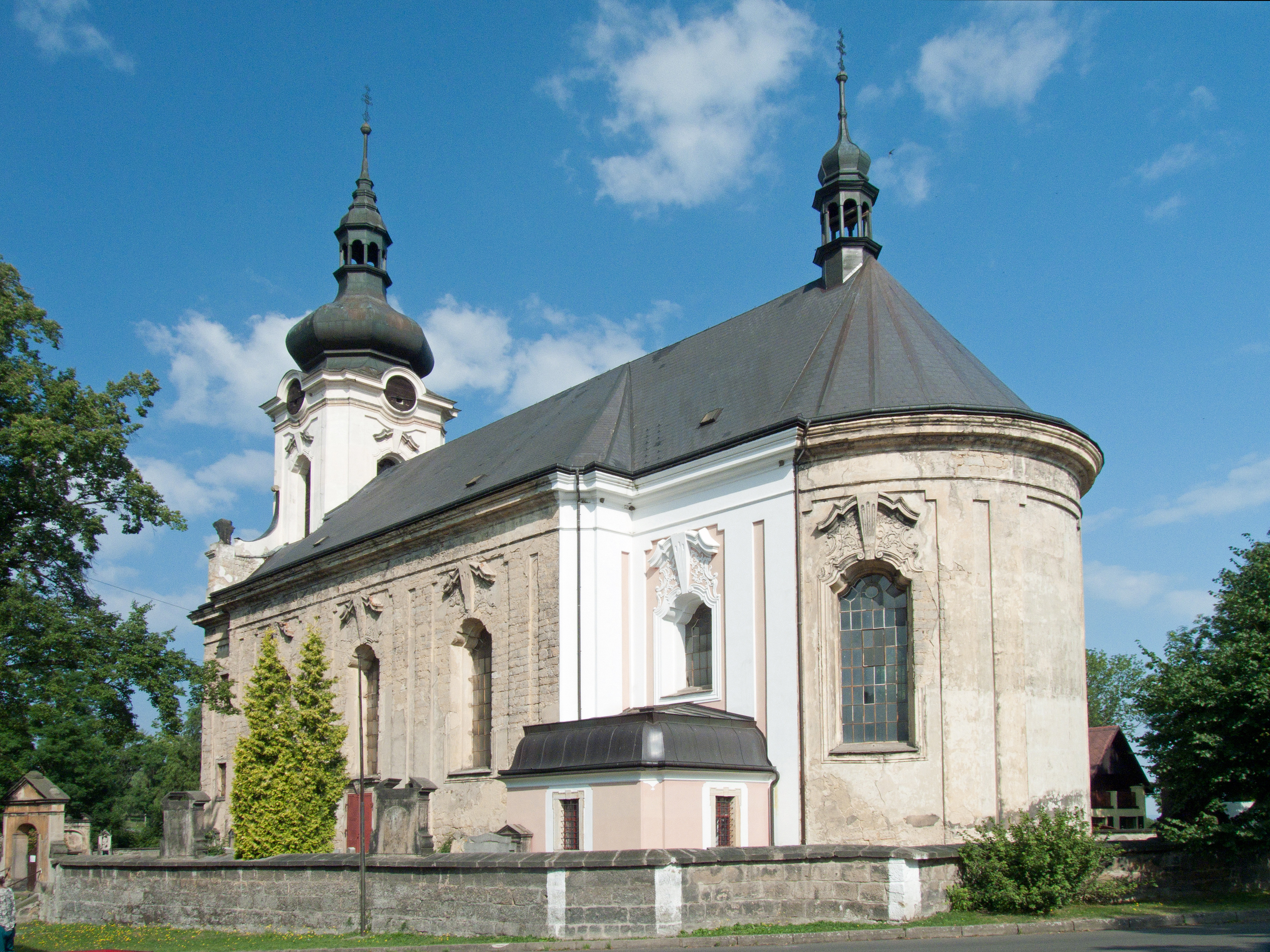
- Church of the Assumption of the Virgin Mary

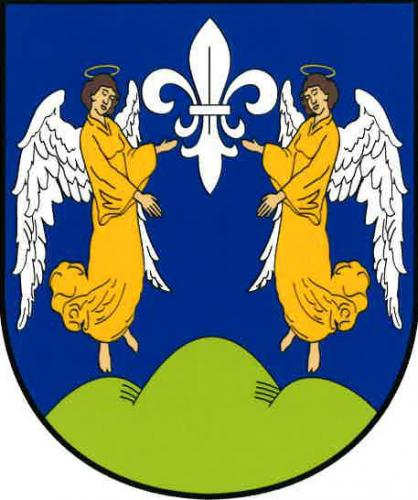
- Flag Coat of arms

- Location in the Czech Republic
- Coordinates: 50°50′14″N 14°15′51″E
- Country: Czech Republic
- Region: Ústí nad Labem
- District: Děčín
- First mentioned: 1352

Area
  - Total: 5.54 km^{2} (2.14 sq mi)
- Elevation: 343 m (1,125 ft)

Population (2026-01-01)
  - Total: 414
  - Density: 74.7/km^{2} (194/sq mi)
- Time zone: UTC+1 (CET)
  - Summer (DST): UTC+2 (CEST)
- Postal code: 407 14
- Website: www.ouarnoltice.cz

Arnoltice (German: Arnsdorf) is a municipality and village in Děčín District in the Ústí nad Labem Region of the Czech Republic. It has about 400 inhabitants.

Arnoltice lies approximately 10 kilometres (6 mi) north-east of Děčín, 26 km (16 mi) north-east of Ústí nad Labem, and 84 km (52 mi) north of Prague.

== Demographics ==
Historical population
Year	Pop.	±%
1869	835	—
1880	867	+3.8%
1890	822	−5.2%
1900	779	−5.2%
1910	762	−2.2%
1921	686	−10.0%
1930	716	+4.4%
1950	308	−57.0%
1961	340	+10.4%
1970	307	−9.7%
1980	259	−15.6%
1991	261	+0.8%
2001	285	+9.2%
2011	371	+30.2%
2021	390	+5.1%
Source: Censuses
