= Heřmanov (Děčín District) =

- Municipality
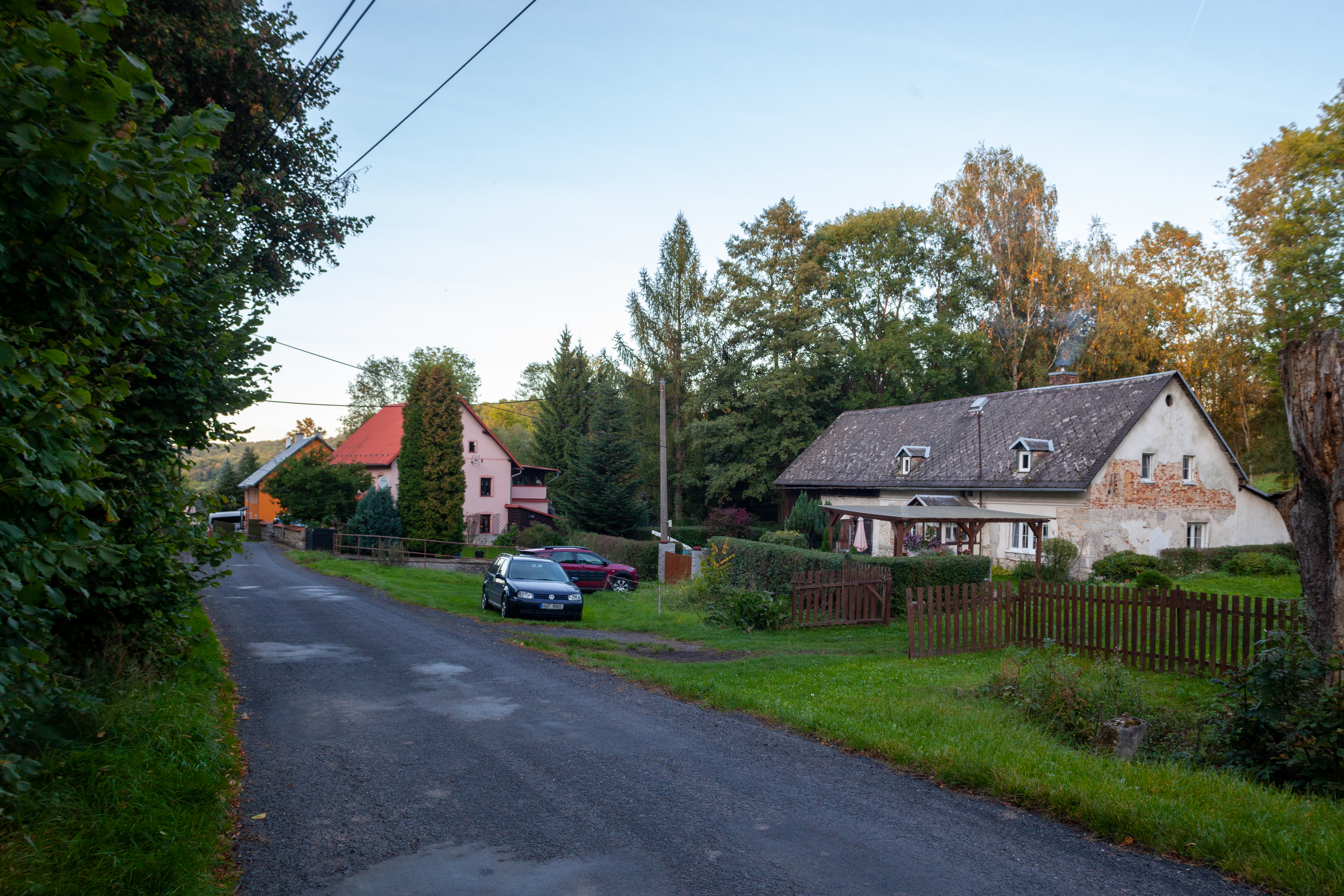
- Blankartice, a part of Heřmanov

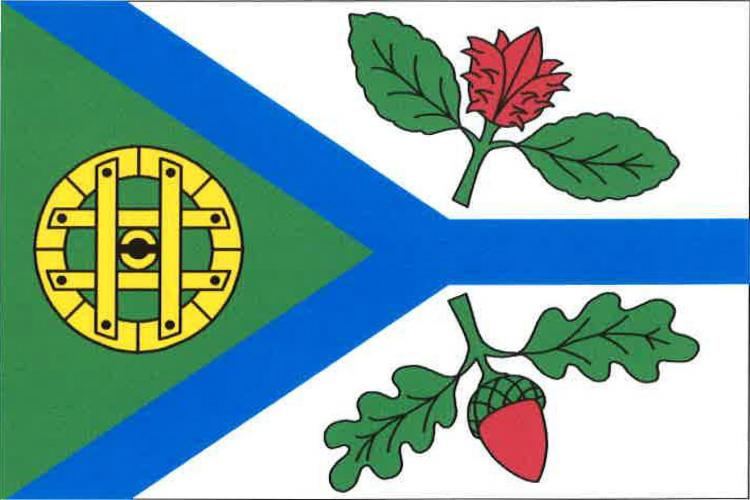
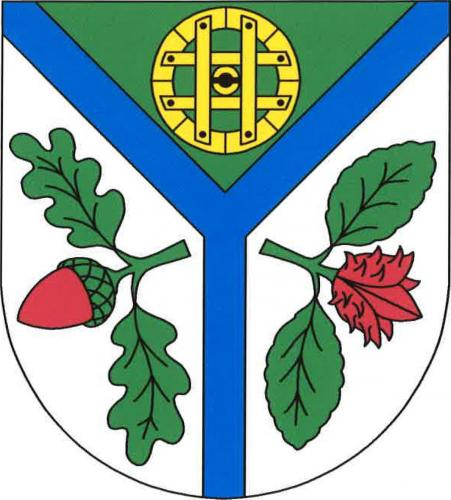
- Flag Coat of arms

- Location in the Czech Republic
- Coordinates: 50°43′36″N 14°17′29″E
- Country: Czech Republic
- Region: Ústí nad Labem
- District: Děčín
- First mentioned: 1409

Area
  - Total: 17.70 km^{2} (6.83 sq mi)
- Elevation: 274 m (899 ft)

Population (2026-01-01)
  - Total: 499
  - Density: 28.2/km^{2} (73.0/sq mi)
- Time zone: UTC+1 (CET)
  - Summer (DST): UTC+2 (CEST)
- Postal code: 405 02
- Website: www.hermanov.cz

Heřmanov (German: Hermersdorf) is a municipality and village in Děčín District in the Ústí nad Labem Region of the Czech Republic. It has about 500 inhabitants.

Heřmanov lies approximately 9 kilometres (6 mi) south-east of Děčín, 19 km (12 mi) north-east of Ústí nad Labem, and 72 km (45 mi) north of Prague.

== Administrative division ==
Heřmanov consists of three municipal parts (in brackets population according to the 2021 census):

- Heřmanov (274)
- Blankartice (47)
- Fojtovice (142)

== Demographics ==
Historical population
Year	Pop.	±%
1869	2,095	—
1880	2,141	+2.2%
1890	2,096	−2.1%
1900	2,031	−3.1%
1910	1,999	−1.6%
1921	1,865	−6.7%
1930	1,941	+4.1%
1950	789	−59.4%
1961	691	−12.4%
1970	643	−6.9%
1980	543	−15.6%
1991	395	−27.3%
2001	476	+20.5%
2011	497	+4.4%
2021	463	−6.8%
Source: Censuses
