= Ludvíkovice =

- Municipality
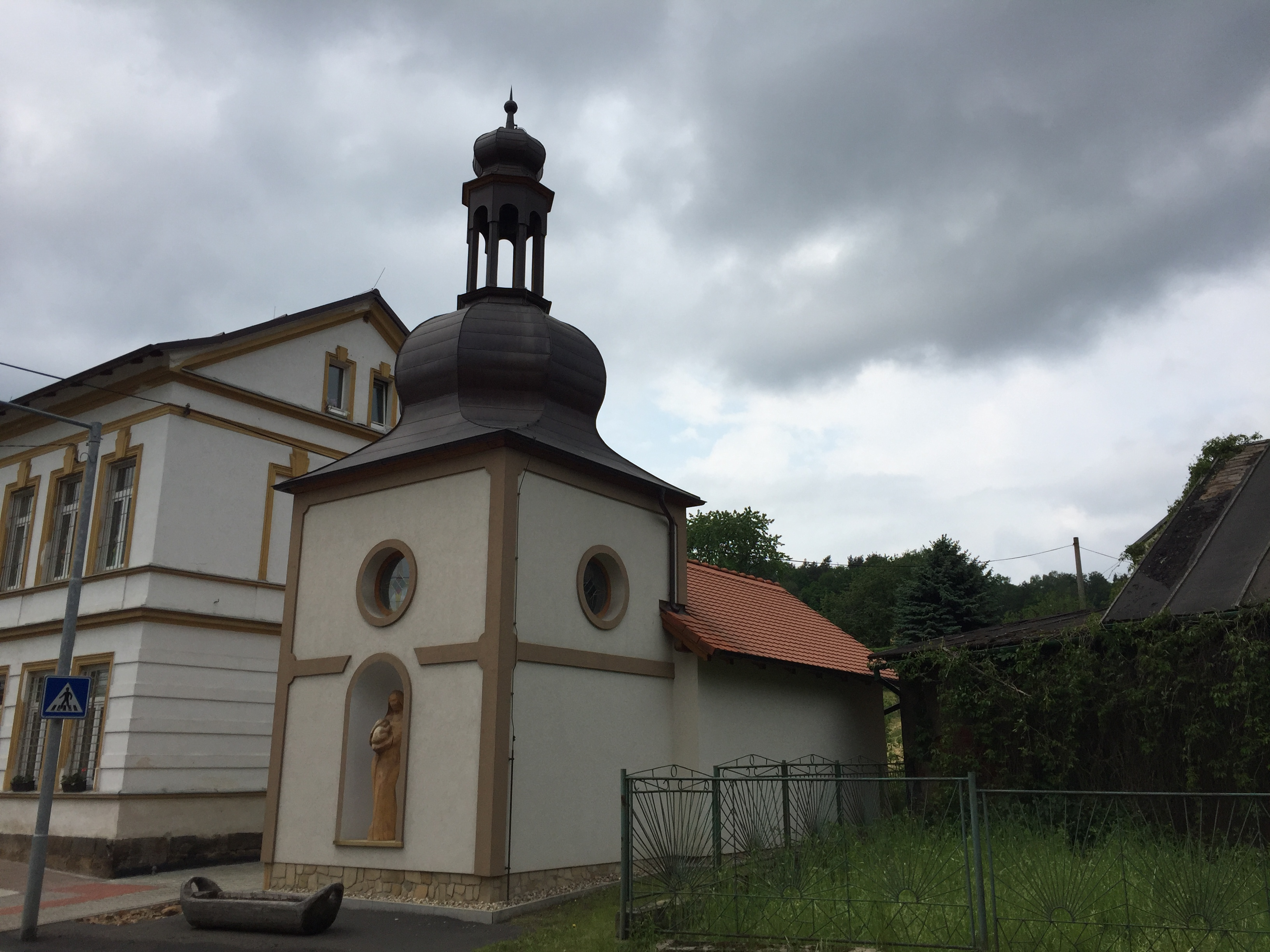
- Chapel in Ludvíkovice

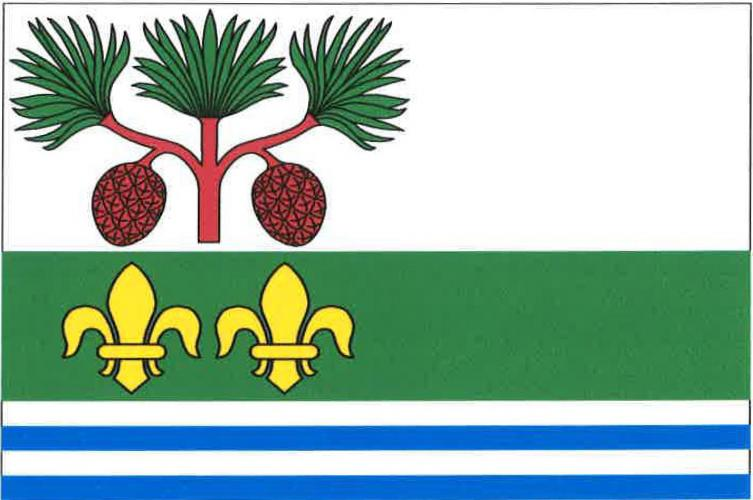
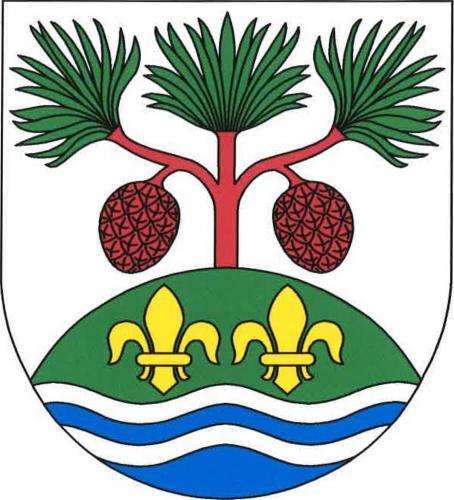
- Flag Coat of arms

- Location in the Czech Republic
- Coordinates: 50°47′39″N 14°15′23″E
- Country: Czech Republic
- Region: Ústí nad Labem
- District: Děčín
- First mentioned: 1425

Area
  - Total: 9.48 km^{2} (3.66 sq mi)
- Elevation: 281 m (922 ft)

Population (2026-01-01)
  - Total: 916
  - Density: 96.6/km^{2} (250/sq mi)
- Time zone: UTC+1 (CET)
  - Summer (DST): UTC+2 (CEST)
- Postal code: 407 13
- Website: www.ou-ludvikovice.cz

Ludvíkovice (German: Loosdorf) is a municipality and village in Děčín District in the Ústí nad Labem Region of the Czech Republic. It has about 900 inhabitants.

Ludvíkovice lies approximately 7 kilometres (4 mi) north-east of Děčín, 23 km (14 mi) north-east of Ústí nad Labem, and 81 km (50 mi) north of Prague.

== Demographics ==
Historical population
Year	Pop.	±%
1869	602	—
1880	628	+4.3%
1890	748	+19.1%
1900	847	+13.2%
1910	1,000	+18.1%
1921	1,025	+2.5%
1930	1,044	+1.9%
1950	724	−30.7%
1961	794	+9.7%
1970	754	−5.0%
1980	702	−6.9%
1991	650	−7.4%
2001	714	+9.8%
2011	881	+23.4%
2021	910	+3.3%
Source: Censuses
