= Františkov nad Ploučnicí =

- Municipality
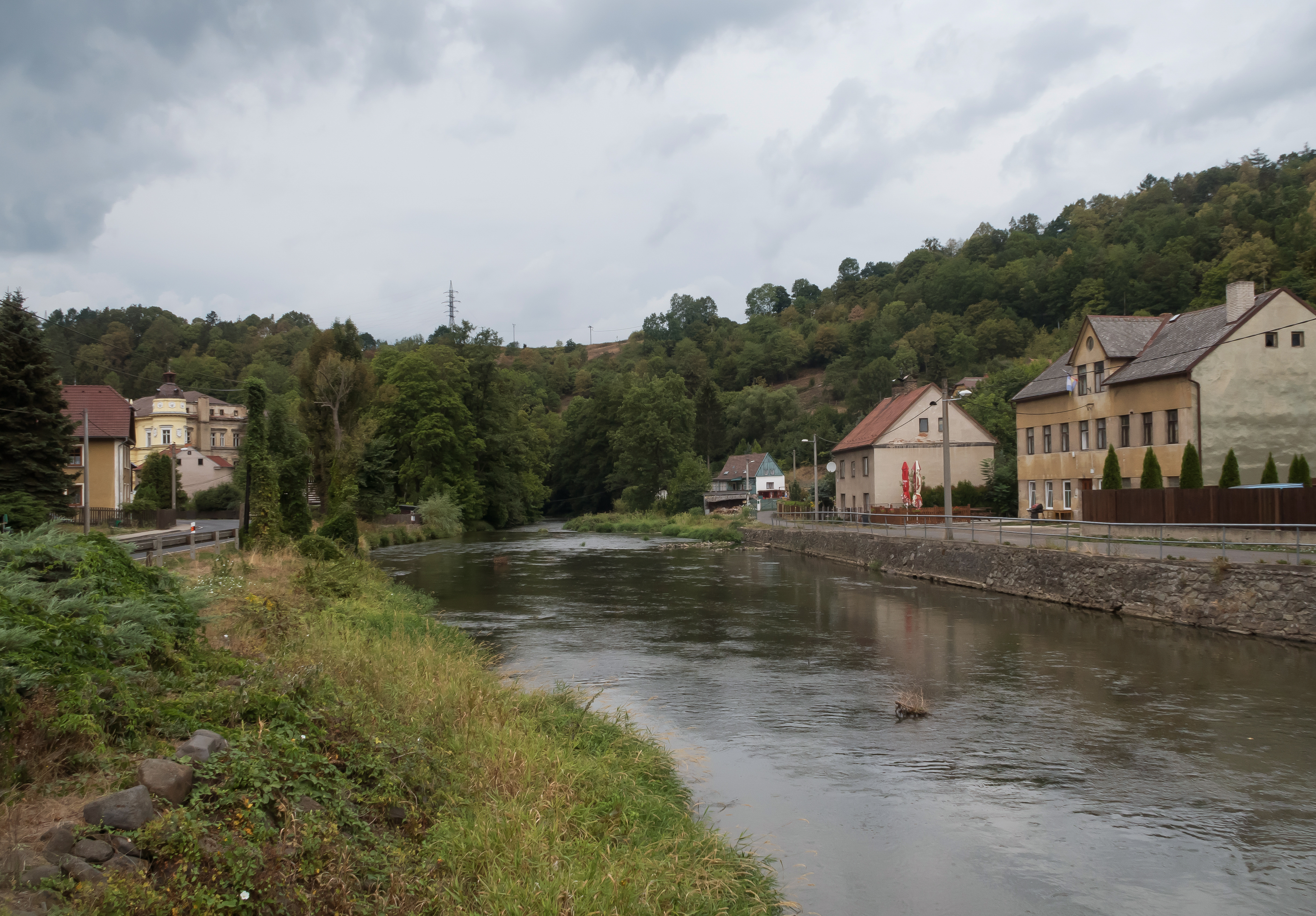
- Ploučnice flowing through the municipality

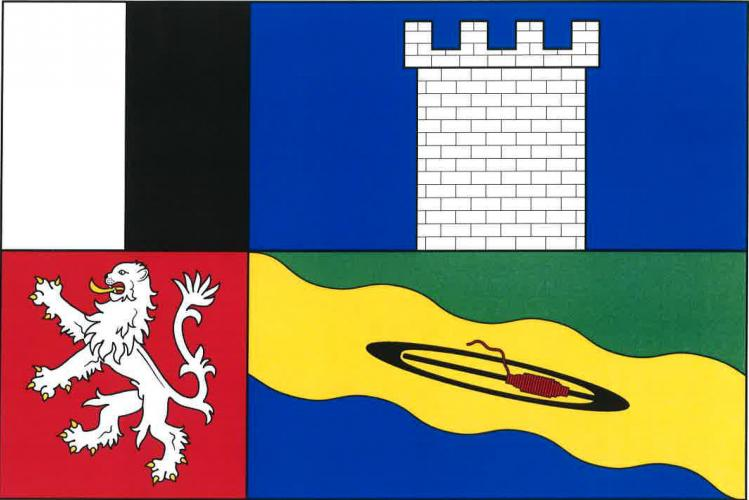
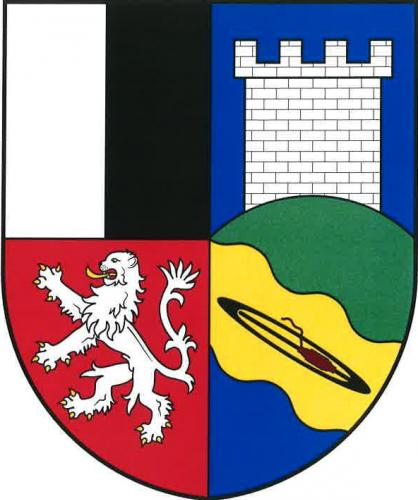
- Flag Coat of arms

- Location in the Czech Republic
- Coordinates: 50°43′33″N 14°19′37″E
- Country: Czech Republic
- Region: Ústí nad Labem
- District: Děčín
- First mentioned: 1708

Area
  - Total: 5.36 km^{2} (2.07 sq mi)
- Elevation: 216 m (709 ft)

Population (2026-01-01)
  - Total: 392
  - Density: 73.1/km^{2} (189/sq mi)
- Time zone: UTC+1 (CET)
  - Summer (DST): UTC+2 (CEST)
- Postal codes: 405 02, 407 23
- Website: www.frantiskovnadploucnici.cz

Františkov nad Ploučnicí (German: Franzenthal-Ulgersdorf) is a municipality and village in Děčín District in the Ústí nad Labem Region of the Czech Republic. It has about 400 inhabitants. It lies on the Ploučnice River.

Františkov nad Ploučnicí lies approximately 12 kilometres (7 mi) south-east of Děčín, 22 km (14 mi) east of Ústí nad Labem, and 72 km (45 mi) north of Prague.

== Administrative division ==
Františkov nad Ploučnicí consists of two municipal parts (in brackets population according to the 2021 census):

- Františkov nad Ploučnicí (373)
- Mlatce (10)

== Demographics ==
Historical population
Year	Pop.	±%
1869	776	—
1880	808	+4.1%
1890	1,095	+35.5%
1900	1,080	−1.4%
1910	1,215	+12.5%
1921	1,070	−11.9%
1930	1,187	+10.9%
1950	739	−37.7%
1961	668	−9.6%
1970	587	−12.1%
1980	482	−17.9%
1991	397	−17.6%
2001	378	−4.8%
2011	364	−3.7%
2021	383	+5.2%
Source: Censuses
