= Kunratice (Děčín District) =

- Municipality
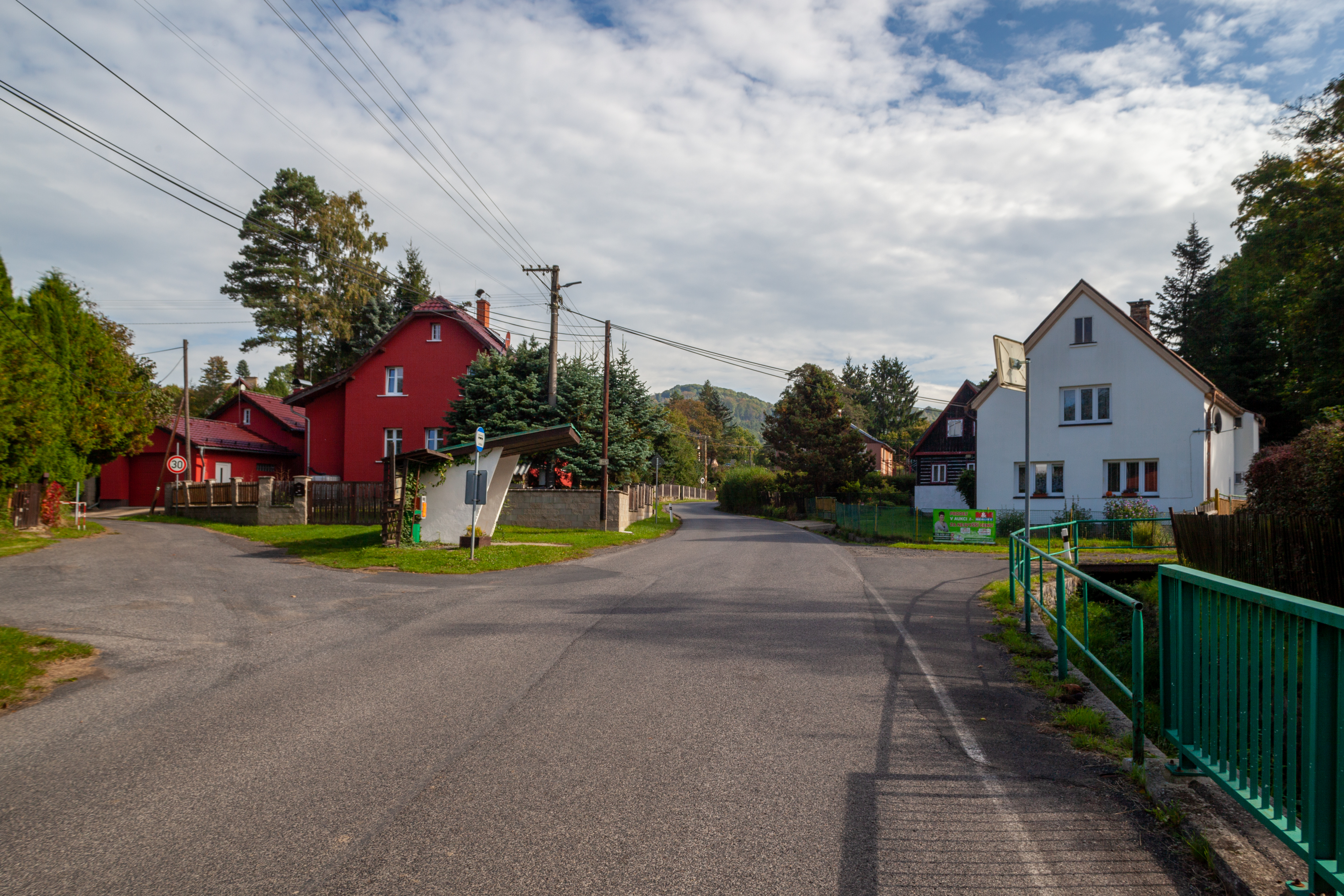
- Centre of Kunratice

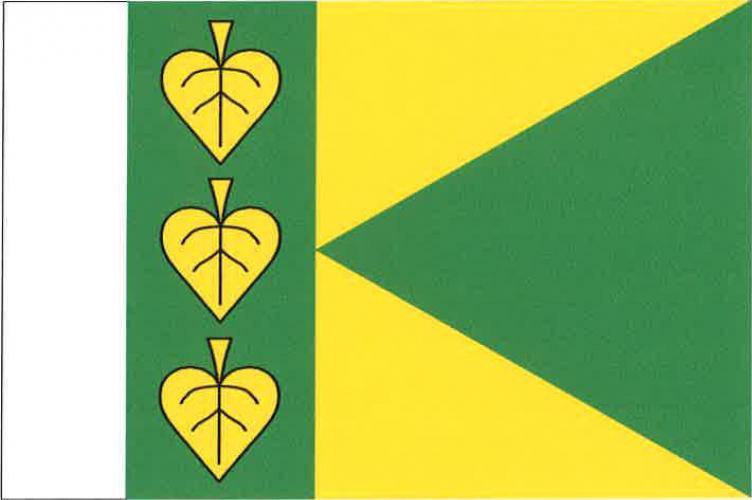
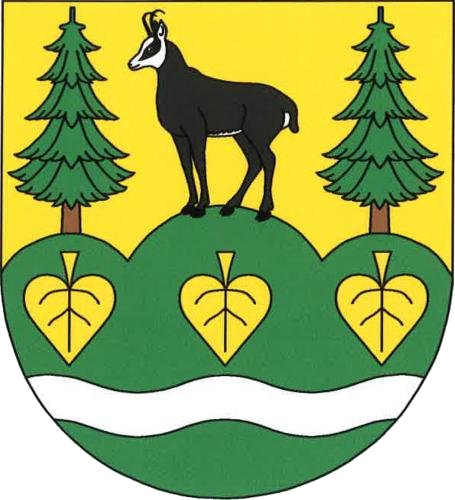
- Flag Coat of arms

- Location in the Czech Republic
- Coordinates: 50°49′8″N 14°25′12″E
- Country: Czech Republic
- Region: Ústí nad Labem
- District: Děčín
- First mentioned: 1380

Area
  - Total: 13.66 km^{2} (5.27 sq mi)
- Elevation: 312 m (1,024 ft)

Population (2026-01-01)
  - Total: 258
  - Density: 18.9/km^{2} (48.9/sq mi)
- Time zone: UTC+1 (CET)
  - Summer (DST): UTC+2 (CEST)
- Postal code: 405 02
- Website: www.obec-kunratice.cz

Kunratice (German: Kunnersdorf) is a municipality and village in Děčín District in the Ústí nad Labem Region of the Czech Republic. It has about 300 inhabitants.

== Administrative division ==
Kunratice consists of three municipal parts (in brackets population according to the 2021 census):

- Kunratice (196)
- Lipnice (20)
- Studený (22)

== Demographics ==
Historical population
Year	Pop.	±%
1869	1,244	—
1880	1,192	−4.2%
1890	1,055	−11.5%
1900	976	−7.5%
1910	934	−4.3%
1921	828	−11.3%
1930	881	+6.4%
1950	345	−60.8%
1961	306	−11.3%
1970	307	+0.3%
1980	233	−24.1%
1991	184	−21.0%
2001	241	+31.0%
2011	246	+2.1%
2021	238	−3.3%
Source: Censuses
