= Ústí nad Labem-Chomutov agglomeration =

Area of the Czech Republic

Ústí nad Labem-Chomutov agglomeration Ústecko-chomutovská aglomerace
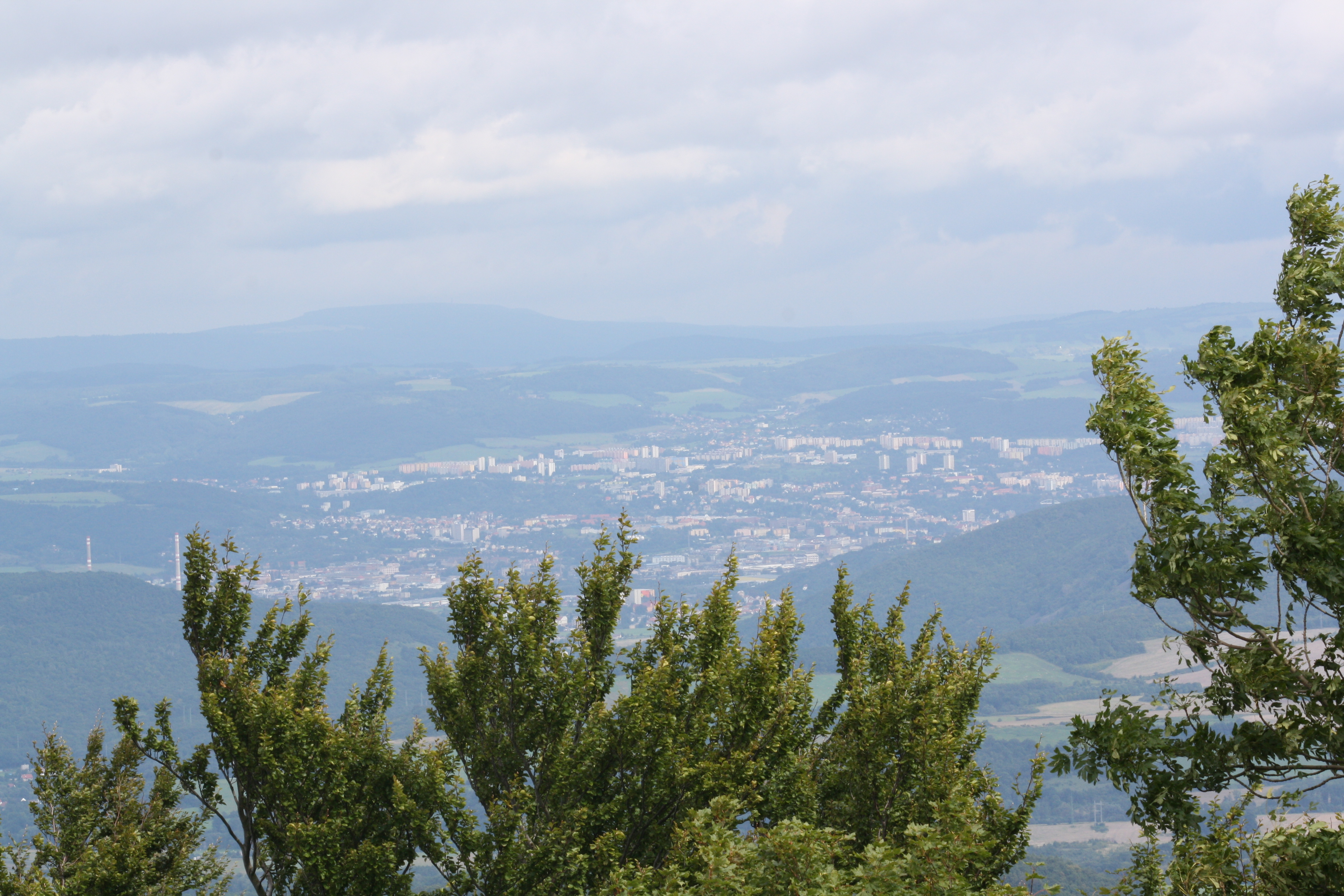
- View of Ústí nad Labem
- Country: Czech Republic
- Region: Ústí nad Labem
- Largest city: Ústí nad Labem

Area
  - Total: 2,317 km^{2} (895 sq mi)

Population (2024)
  - Total: 553,455
  - Density: 238.9/km^{2} (618.7/sq mi)
- Time zone: UTC+1 (CET)
  - Summer (DST): UTC+2 (CEST)

The Ústí nad Labem-Chomutov agglomeration (Czech: Ústecko-chomutovská aglomerace) is the agglomeration of the cities of Ústí nad Labem, Most, Teplice, Děčín and Chomutov and their surroundings in the Ústí nad Labem Region of the Czech Republic. It was defined in 2020 as a tool for drawing money from the European Structural and Investment Funds and is valid in 2021–2027. The agglomeration has a population of about 553,000.

== Definition ==
The Ústí nad Labem-Chomutov agglomeration was first defined in 2014 by the Ministry of Regional Development of the Czech Republic for the purposes of the Integrated Land Development Plans, which was a tool for drawing money from the European Structural and Investment Funds. The agglomeration comprised 75 municipalities with about 522,000 inhabitants and had an area of 1,543 km^{2} (596 sq mi).

The current Ústí nad Labem-Chomutov agglomeration was defined in 2020 by the Ministry of Regional Development for the purposes of the so-called Integrated Territorial Investment (ITI), which is a newer tool for drawing money from the European Structural and Investment Funds.

The territory was defined on the basis of a coefficient composed of three methods: integrated system of centres (i.e. delineation of commuting flows based on mobile operator data from 2019), time spent in core cities (based on mobile operator data from 2019) and residential suburbanization zones (based on statistics of realized housing construction and directional migration from the core of the agglomeration to suburban municipalities in the period 2009–2016). The scope of the territory is valid for the period 2021–2027.

== Municipalities ==
The agglomeration includes 132 municipalities.

Name	Population (2024)
Arnoltice	422
Bečov	1,386
Benešov nad Ploučnicí	3,574
Bílence	254
Bílina	14,580
Bitozeves	525
Blatno	615
Blažim	289
Boleboř	345
Bořislav	418
Braňany	1,191
Brandov	283
Březno	1,439
Bynovec	343
Bystřany	1,935
Bžany	917
Černovice	665
Český Jiřetín	103
Chabařovice	2,551
Chlumec	4,280
Chomutov	47,023
Chuderov	1,164
Děčín	46,799
Dobkovice	661
Dobrná	446
Dolní Habartice	605
Dolní Zálezly	560
Droužkovice	833
Dubí	8,071
Duchcov	8,685
Františkov nad Ploučnicí	392
Habrovany	230
Havraň	619
Hlinná	293
Homole u Panny	403
Hora Svaté Kateřiny	460
Hora Svatého Šebestiána	347
Horní Habartice	446
Horní Jiřetín	2,202
Hostomice	1,229
Hřensko	256
Hrobčice	1,112
Hrušovany	536
Huntířov	818
Janov	341
Jeníkov	874
Jetřichovice	397
Jílové	4,979
Jirkov	19,323
Kadaň	18,165
Kalek	261
Kámen	251
Kladruby	437
Klášterec nad Ohří	14,175
Korozluky	262
Košťany	3,238
Křimov	427
Krupka	12,779
Kunratice	266
Labská Stráň	223
Lahošť	691
Ledvice	536
Libouchec	1,897
Lišnice	214
Litoměřice	22,983
Litvínov	22,512
Lom	3,715
Louka u Litvínova	745
Lovečkovice	605
Ludvíkovice	955
Lukov	133
Lužice	580
Malá Veleň	435
Malé Březno (Most District)	241
Malé Březno (Ústí nad Labem District)	525
Malečov	858
Málkov	986
Malšovice	1,011
Mariánské Radčice	460
Markvartice	741
Meziboří	4,587
Místo	424
Modlany	1,144
Most	63,882
Nezabylice	279
Novosedlice	2,157
Obrnice	2,042
Ohníč	713
Osek	4,558
Otvice	714
Patokryje	440
Pesvice	198
Petrovice	904
Polerady	231
Povrly	2,261
Prackovice nad Labem	640
Přestanov	598
Proboštov	2,692
Řehlovice	1,463
Rokle	448
Rtyně nad Bílinou	835
Růžová	577
Ryjice	194
Skršín	297
Spořice	1,558
Srbice	492
Stebno	482
Strupčice	1,138
Světec	972
Tašov	133
Těchlovice	536
Telnice	694
Teplice	50,959
Tisá	1,005
Trmice	3,357
Údlice	1,322
Újezdeček	874
Ústí nad Labem	91,342
Velemyšleves	343
Velké Březno	2,432
Velké Chvojno	877
Volevčice	127
Vrskmaň	346
Všehrdy	156
Všestudy	179
Výsluní	286
Výškov	483
Vysoká Pec	1,174
Zabrušany	1,160
Žalany	498
Želenice	485
Žim	241
Total	553,455
