= Malšovice =

- Municipality
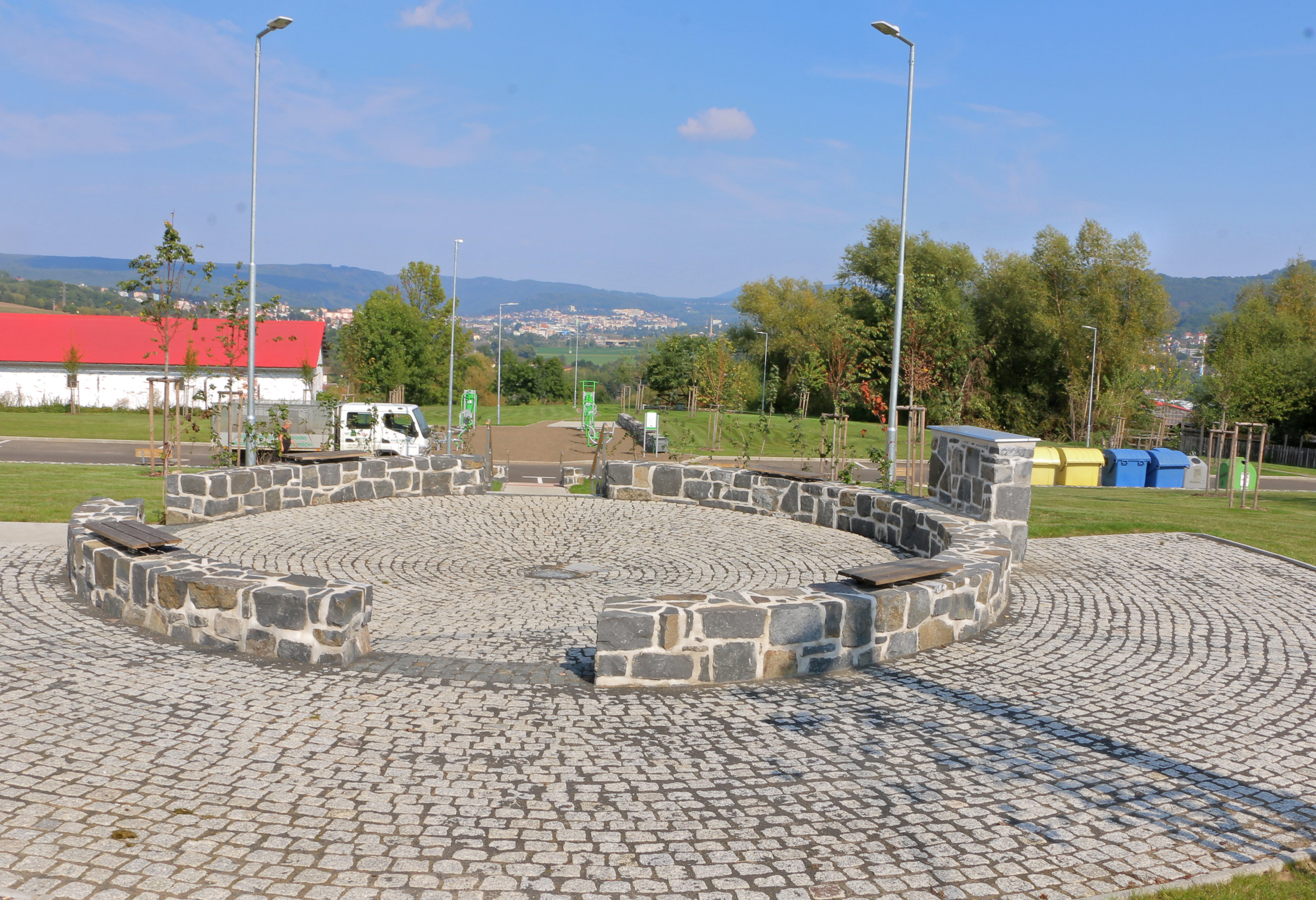
- Park in the centre of Malšovice

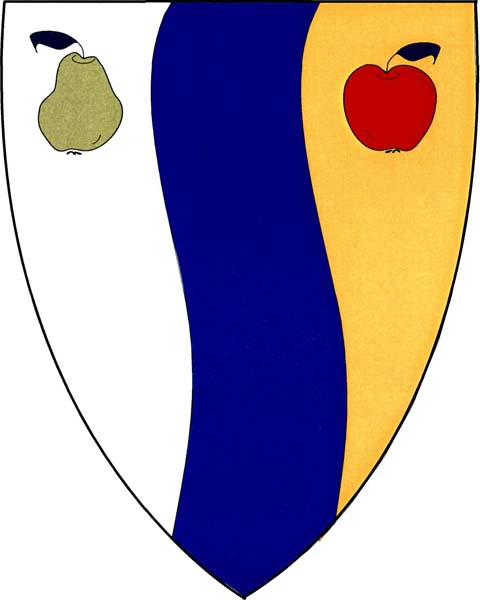
- Flag Coat of arms

- Location in the Czech Republic
- Coordinates: 50°44′7″N 14°10′11″E
- Country: Czech Republic
- Region: Ústí nad Labem
- District: Děčín
- First mentioned: 1515

Area
  - Total: 13.03 km^{2} (5.03 sq mi)
- Elevation: 200 m (660 ft)

Population (2026-01-01)
  - Total: 1,024
  - Density: 78.59/km^{2} (203.5/sq mi)
- Time zone: UTC+1 (CET)
  - Summer (DST): UTC+2 (CEST)
- Postal codes: 405 02, 407 03
- Website: www.malsovice.cz

Malšovice (German: Malschwitz) is a municipality and village in Děčín District in the Ústí nad Labem Region of the Czech Republic. It has about 1,000 inhabitants.

== Administrative division ==
Malšovice consists of seven municipal parts (in brackets population according to the 2021 census):

- Malšovice (539)
- Borek (34)
- Choratice (129)
- Hliněná (47)
- Javory (69)
- Nová Bohyně (27)
- Stará Bohyně (61)

== Etymology ==
The name is derived from the personal name Malša, meaning "the village of Malša's people".

== Geography ==
Jílové is located about 4 kilometres (2 mi) south of Děčín and 12 km (7 mi) northeast of Ústí nad Labem. It lies in the Elbe Sandstone Mountains and in the Labské pískovce Protected Landscape Area. The highest point is the hill Javorský vrch at 617 m (2,024 ft) above sea level. The municipality is situated on the left bank of the Elbe River, which forms the eastern municipal border.

== History ==
The first written mention of Malšovice is from 1515, when the Děčín estate was sold to the Lords of Salhausen. It belonged to the Děčín estate until the establishment of independent municipalities in 1849. In 1849–1911, Malšovice was a part of Vilsnice (today a city part of Děčín). Since 1911, it has been an independent municipality.

Until 1945, Malšovice had a German majority. In 1945, the German-speaking inhabitants were expelled and the municipality was resettled by Czechs.

== Demographics ==
Historical population

Year	Pop.	±%
1869	1,141	—
1880	1,113	−2.5%
1890	1,188	+6.7%
1900	1,234	+3.9%
1910	1,342	+8.8%

Year	Pop.	±%
1921	1,491	+11.1%
1930	1,620	+8.7%
1950	1,108	−31.6%
1961	1,103	−0.5%
1970	792	−28.2%

Year	Pop.	±%
1980	768	−3.0%
1991	652	−15.1%
2001	723	+10.9%
2011	808	+11.8%
2021	906	+12.1%

Source: Censuses

== Transport ==
The I/62 road (part of the European route E442) from Ústí nad Labem to Děčín runs through the municipality.

The village of Choratice has a train station on the railway line Děčín–Kadaň.

== Sights ==
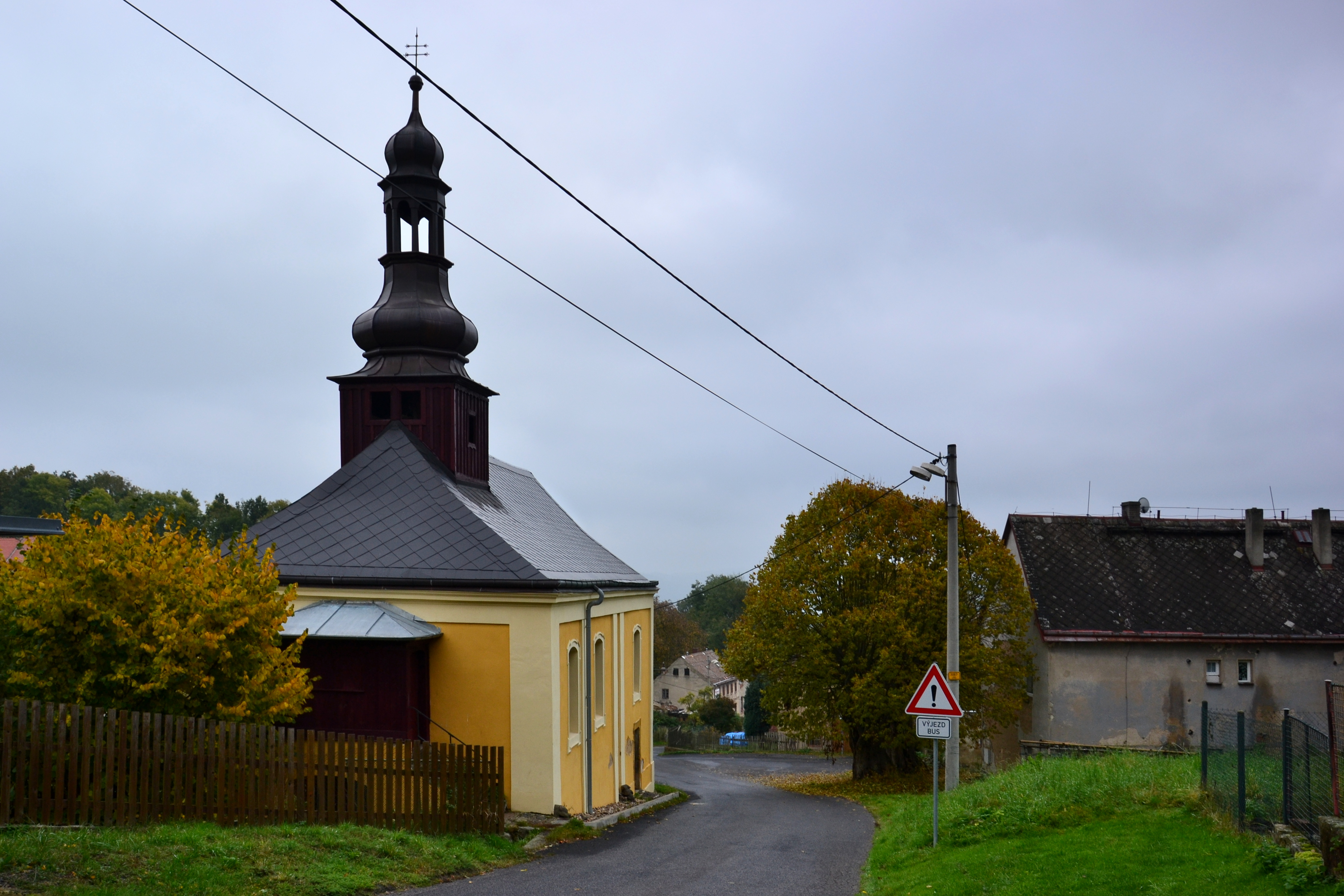
Church of Saint Procopius

The main landmark is the Church of Saint Procopius in Javory. It was built in the late Baroque style in 1748 as a chapel. In 1772, the wooden tower was added. In 1816, the chapel was further extended and became a church.
