= Bitozeves =

- Municipality
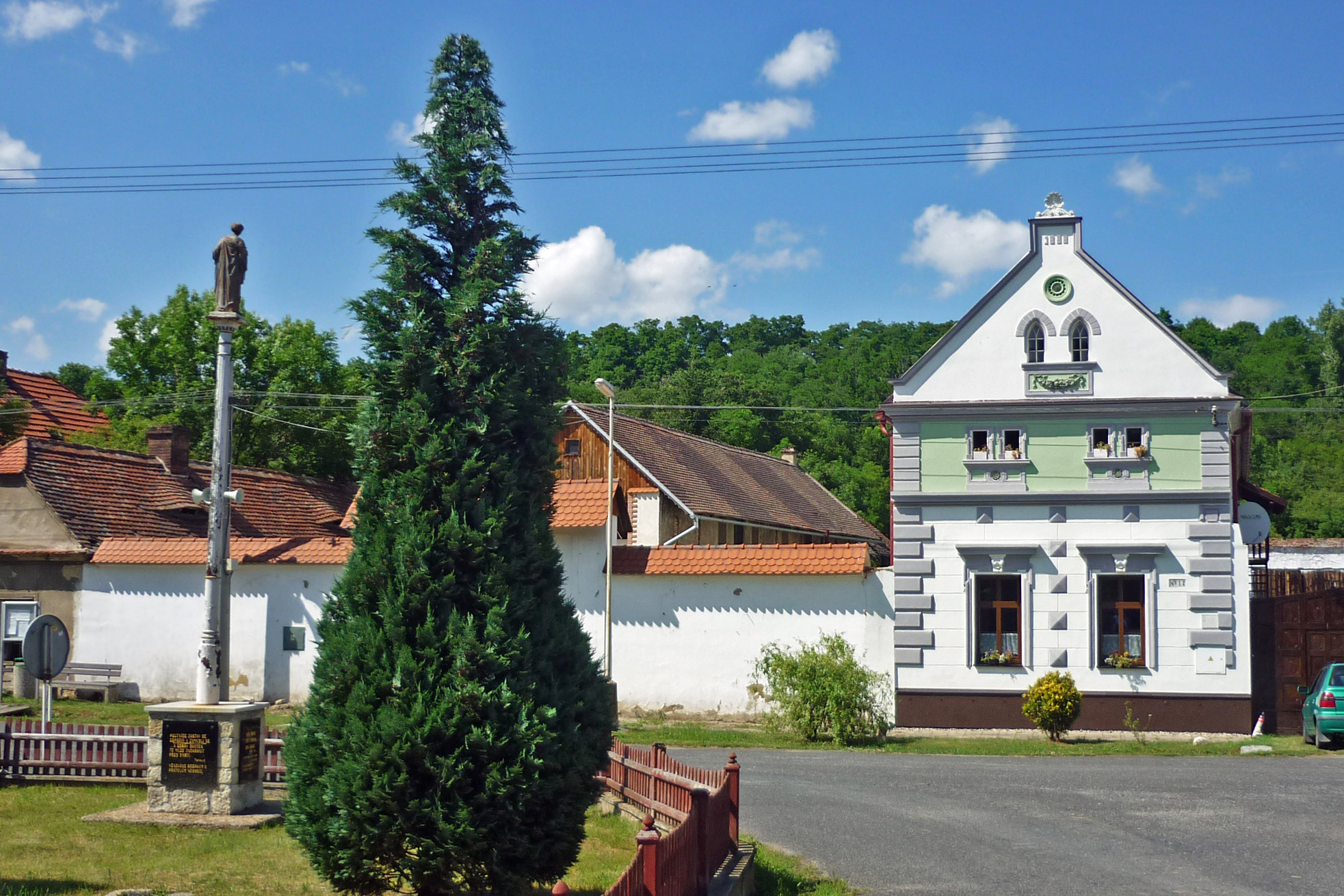
- Nehasice, a part of Bitozeves

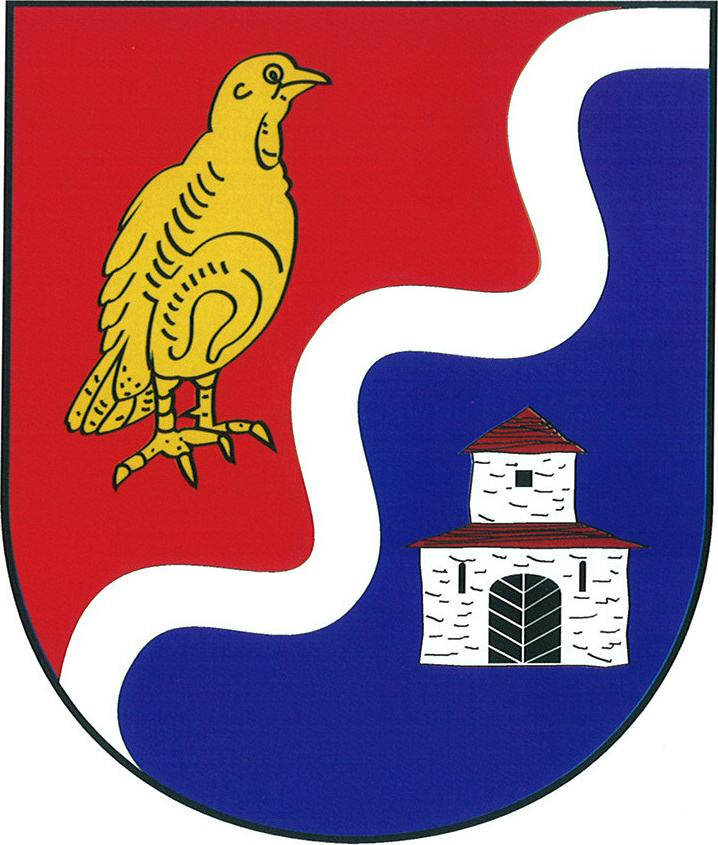
- Flag Coat of arms

- Location in the Czech Republic
- Coordinates: 50°22′24″N 13°38′27″E
- Country: Czech Republic
- Region: Ústí nad Labem
- District: Louny
- First mentioned: 1318

Area
  - Total: 20.96 km^{2} (8.09 sq mi)
- Elevation: 231 m (758 ft)

Population (2026-01-01)
  - Total: 534
  - Density: 25.5/km^{2} (66.0/sq mi)
- Time zone: UTC+1 (CET)
  - Summer (DST): UTC+2 (CEST)
- Postal codes: 438 01, 440 01
- Website: www.bitozeves.cz

Bitozeves (German: Witosess) is a municipality and village in Louny District in the Ústí nad Labem Region of the Czech Republic. It has about 500 inhabitants.

Bitozeves lies approximately 12 kilometres (7 mi) west of Louny, 44 km (27 mi) south-west of Ústí nad Labem, and 65 km (40 mi) north-west of Prague.

== Administrative division ==
Bitozeves consists of five municipal parts (in brackets population according to the 2021 census):

- Bitozeves (267)
- Bitozeves-Průmyslová zóna Triangle (4)
- Nehasice (63)
- Tatinná (36)
- Vidovle (48)

== Demographics ==
Historical population
Year	Pop.	±%
1869	1,134	—
1880	1,270	+12.0%
1890	1,255	−1.2%
1900	1,330	+6.0%
1910	1,336	+0.5%
1921	1,348	+0.9%
1930	1,298	−3.7%
1950	679	−47.7%
1961	636	−6.3%
1970	528	−17.0%
1980	424	−19.7%
1991	328	−22.6%
2001	361	+10.1%
2011	383	+6.1%
2021	418	+9.1%
Source: Censuses
