= Těchlovice (Děčín District) =

- Municipality
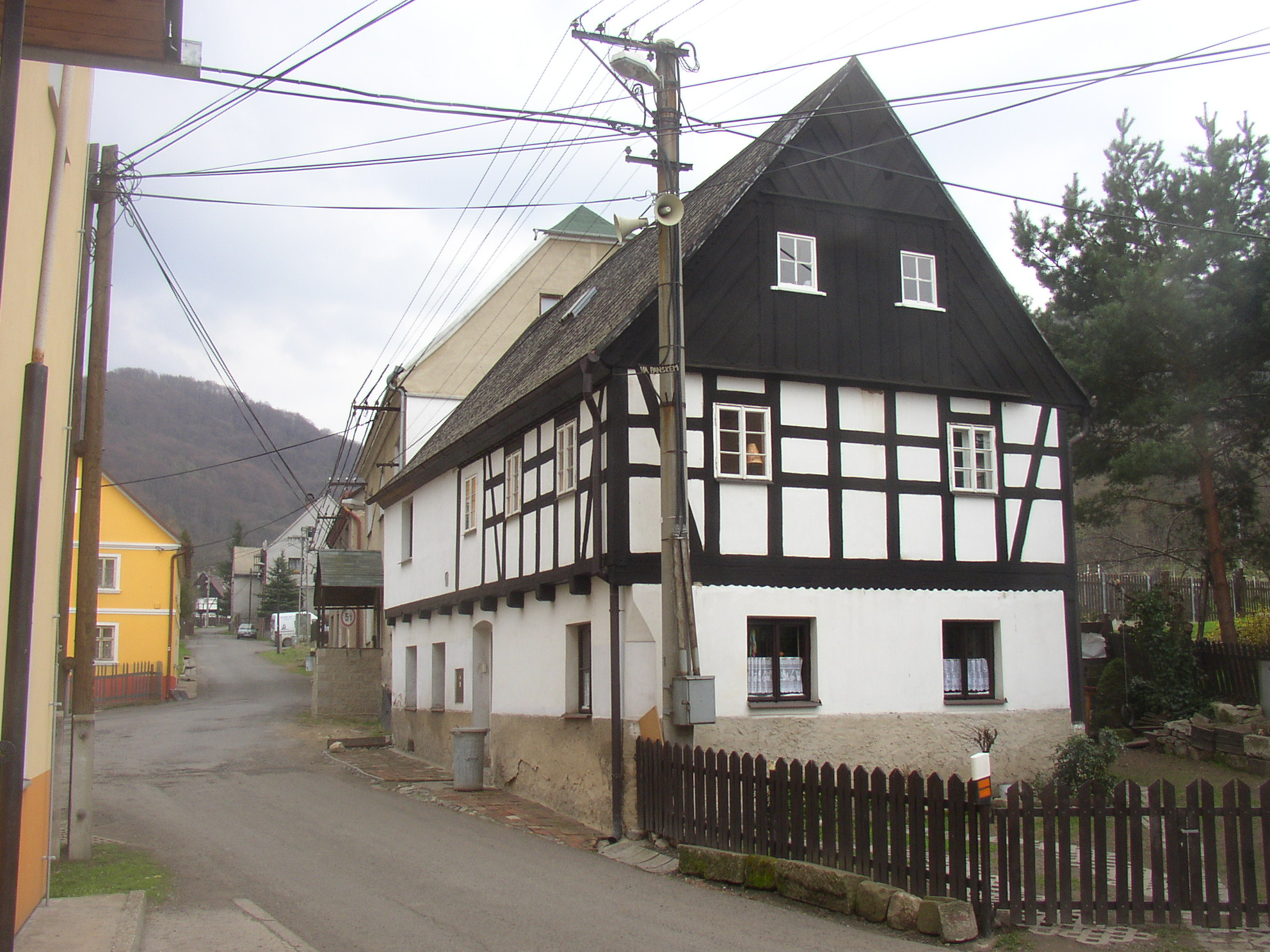
- Half-timbered house in the centre of Těchlovice

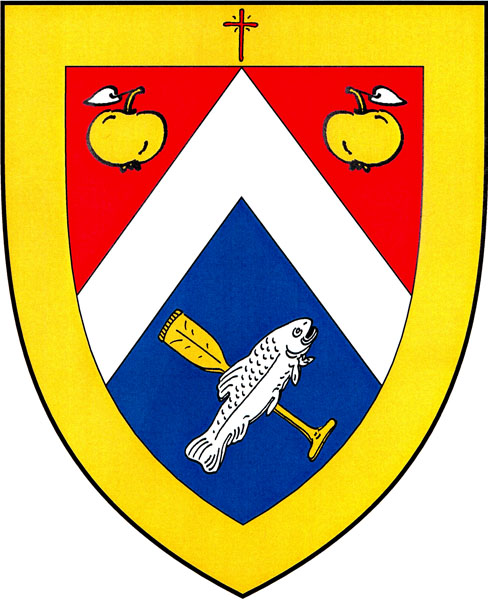
- Flag Coat of arms

- Location in the Czech Republic
- Coordinates: 50°41′47″N 14°12′18″E
- Country: Czech Republic
- Region: Ústí nad Labem
- District: Děčín
- First mentioned: 1352

Area
  - Total: 10.49 km^{2} (4.05 sq mi)
- Elevation: 145 m (476 ft)

Population (2026-01-01)
  - Total: 503
  - Density: 48.0/km^{2} (124/sq mi)
- Time zone: UTC+1 (CET)
  - Summer (DST): UTC+2 (CEST)
- Postal code: 405 02
- Website: www.techlovice-dc.cz

Těchlovice (German: Tichlowitz) is a municipality and village in Děčín District in the Ústí nad Labem Region of the Czech Republic. It has about 500 inhabitants.

Těchlovice lies approximately 9 kilometres (6 mi) south of Děčín, 13 km (8 mi) east of Ústí nad Labem, and 70 km (43 mi) north of Prague.

== Demographics ==
Historical population
Year	Pop.	±%
1869	860	—
1880	922	+7.2%
1890	978	+6.1%
1900	1,161	+18.7%
1910	1,206	+3.9%
1921	1,131	−6.2%
1930	1,230	+8.8%
1950	709	−42.4%
1961	688	−3.0%
1970	652	−5.2%
1980	564	−13.5%
1991	442	−21.6%
2001	439	−0.7%
2011	521	+18.7%
2021	514	−1.3%
Source: Censuses
