= Vrskmaň =

- Municipality
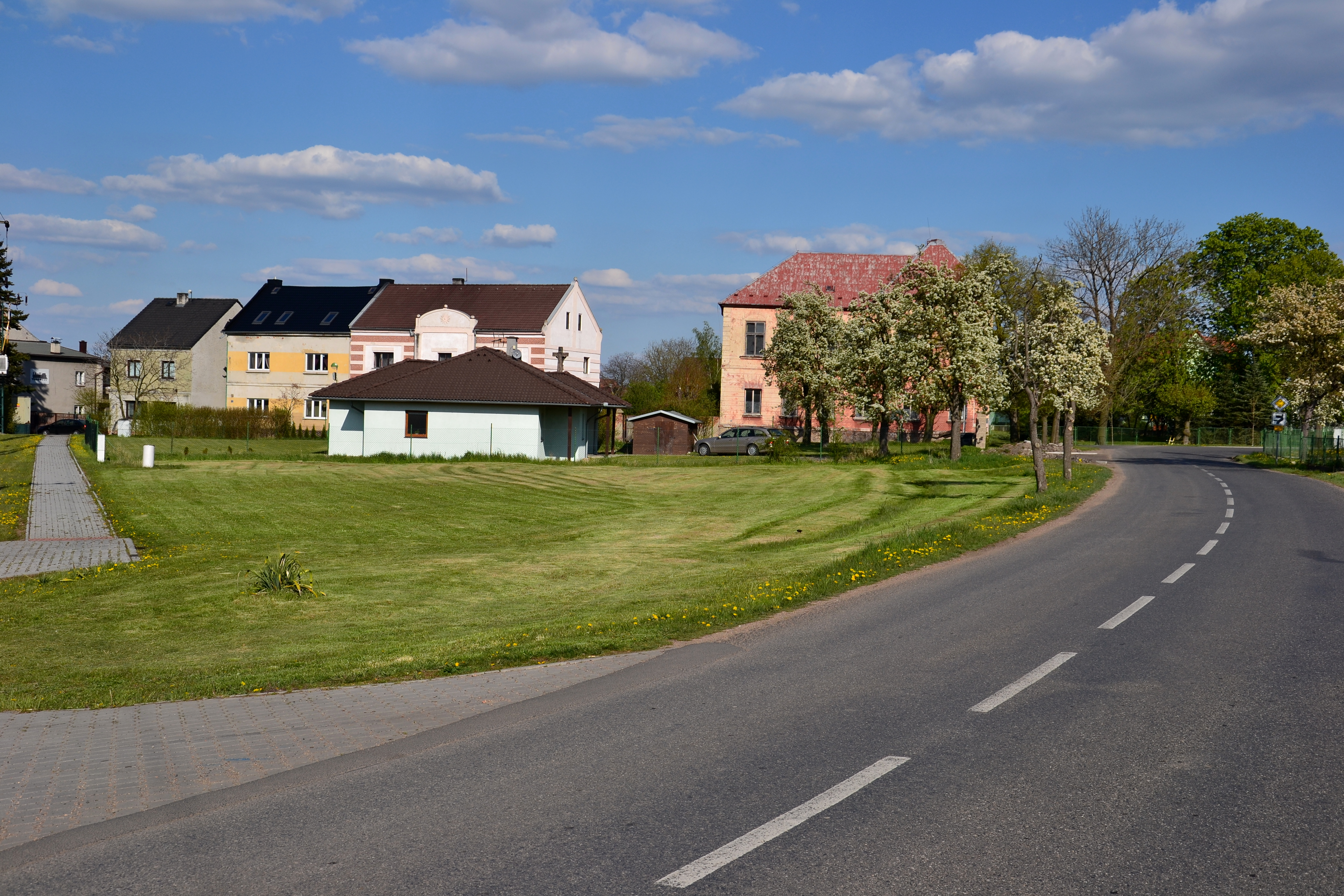
- Western part of Vrskmaň

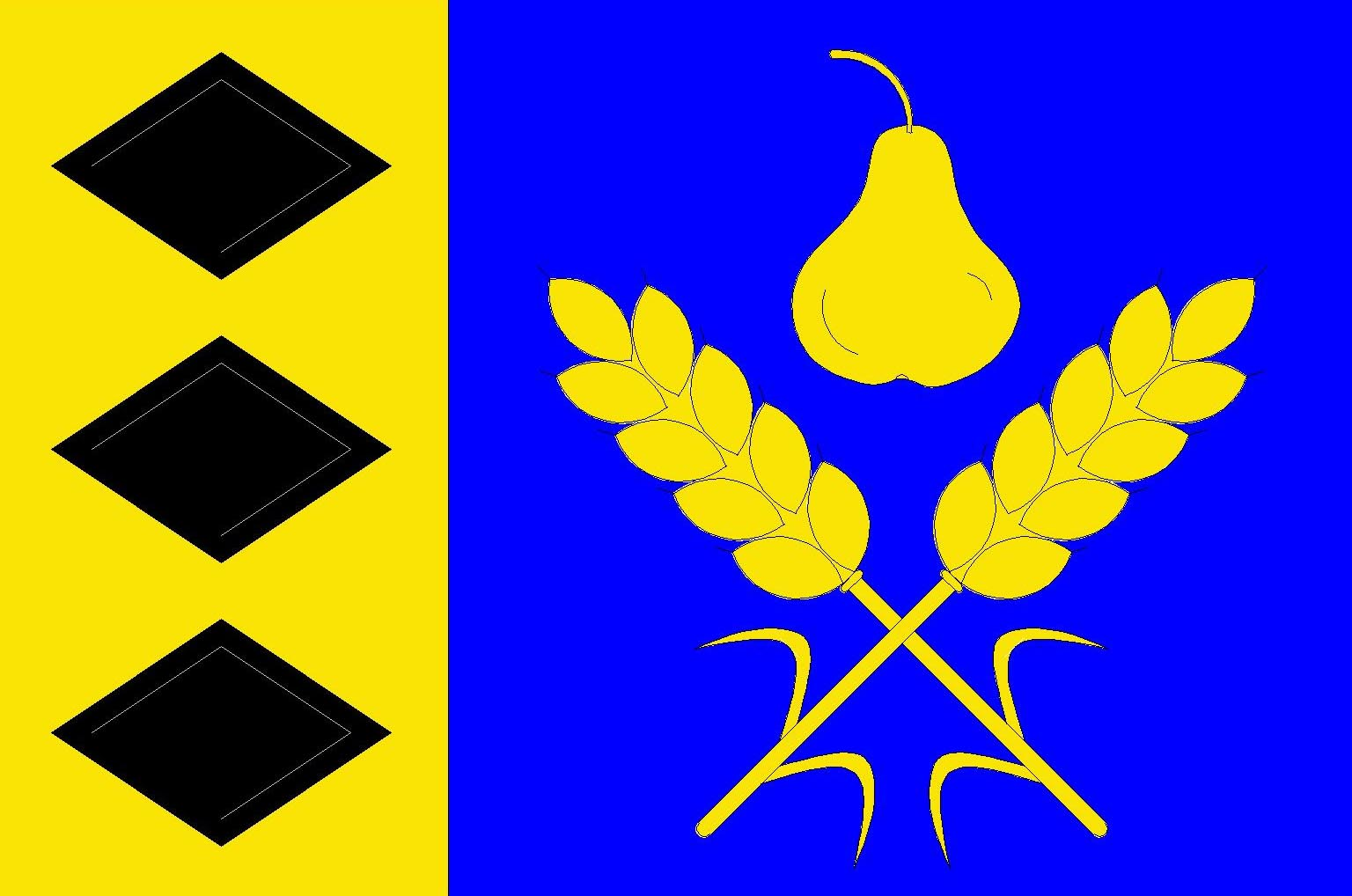
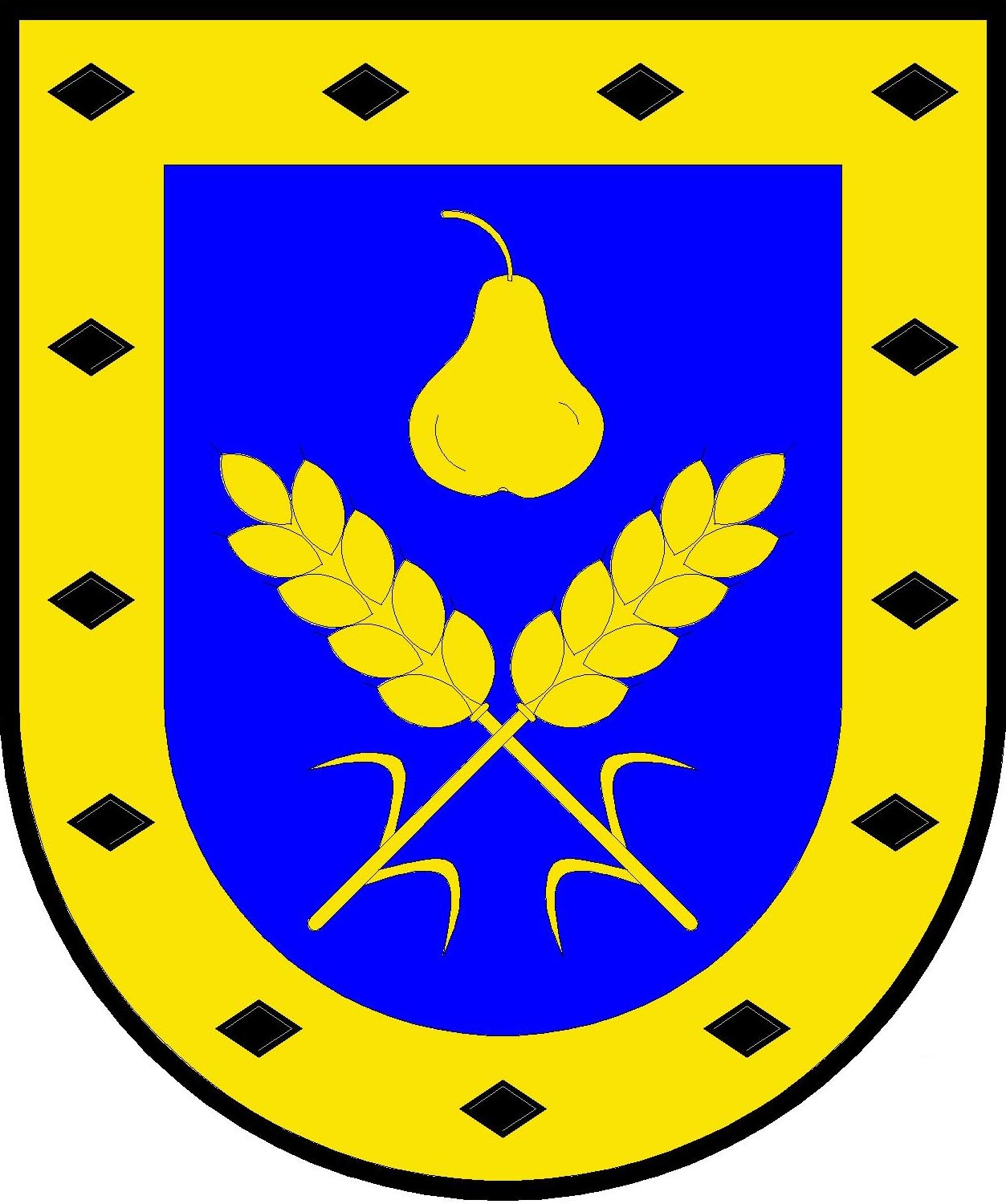
- Flag Coat of arms

- Location in the Czech Republic
- Coordinates: 50°29′18″N 13°29′45″E
- Country: Czech Republic
- Region: Ústí nad Labem
- District: Chomutov
- First mentioned: 1417

Area
  - Total: 15.09 km^{2} (5.83 sq mi)
- Elevation: 307 m (1,007 ft)

Population (2026-01-01)
  - Total: 368
  - Density: 24.4/km^{2} (63.2/sq mi)
- Time zone: UTC+1 (CET)
  - Summer (DST): UTC+2 (CEST)
- Postal codes: 431 11, 431 15
- Website: www.vrskman.cz

Vrskmaň (German: Wurzmes) is a municipality and village in Chomutov District in the Ústí nad Labem Region of the Czech Republic. It has about 400 inhabitants.

Vrskmaň lies approximately 9 kilometres (6 mi) north-east of Chomutov, 43 km (27 mi) south-west of Ústí nad Labem, and 81 km (50 mi) north-west of Prague.

== Administrative division ==
Vrskmaň consists of two municipal parts (in brackets population according to the 2021 census):

- Vrskmaň (184)
- Zaječice (127)

== Demographics ==
Historical population
Year	Pop.	±%
1869	1,319	—
1880	1,470	+11.4%
1890	1,639	+11.5%
1900	1,977	+20.6%
1910	2,494	+26.2%
1921	2,631	+5.5%
1930	3,246	+23.4%
1950	2,168	−33.2%
1961	1,940	−10.5%
1970	870	−55.2%
1980	264	−69.7%
1991	221	−16.3%
2001	204	−7.7%
2011	237	+16.2%
2021	311	+31.2%
Source: Censuses
