= Křimov =

- Municipality
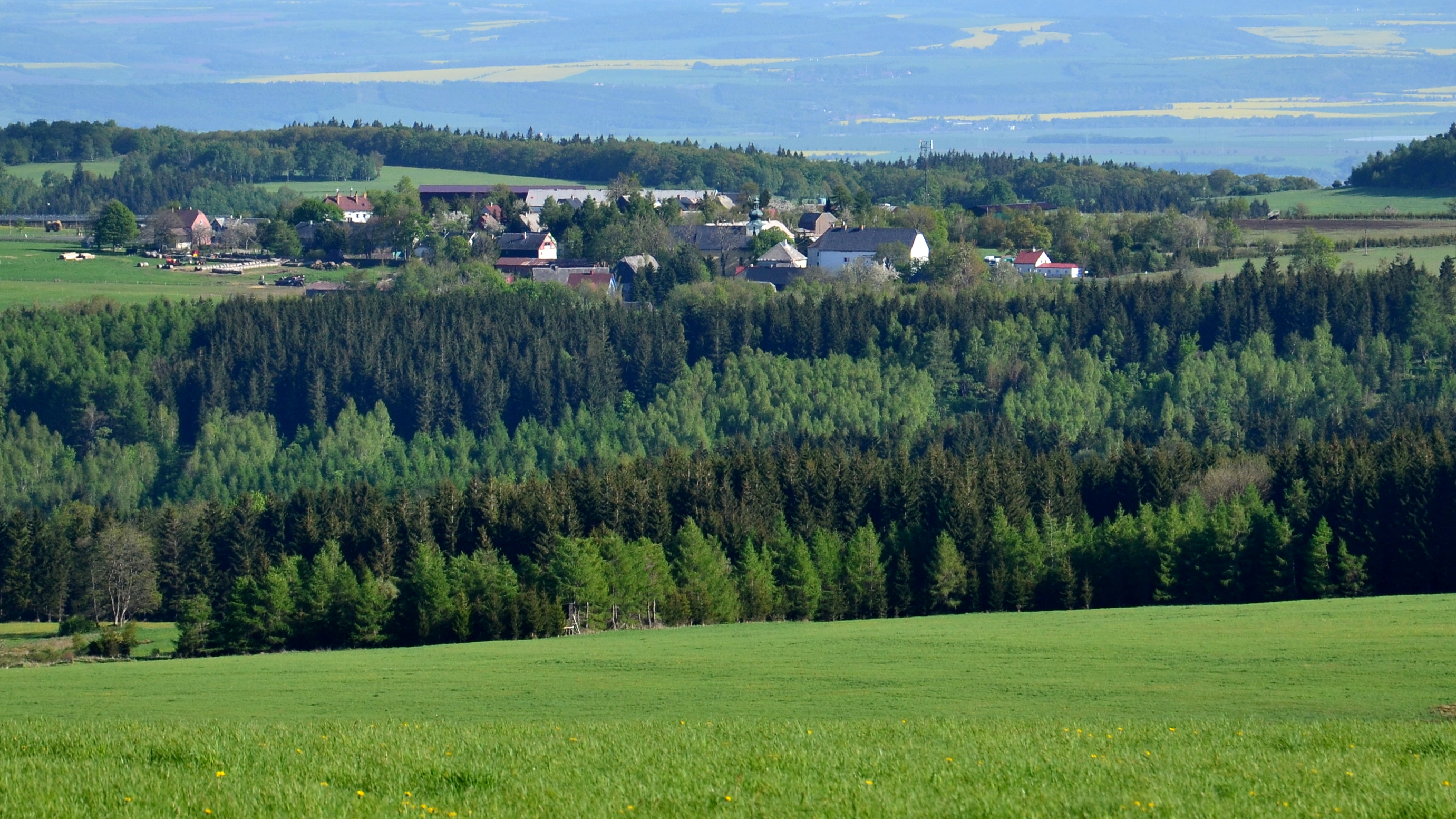
- View from the northwest

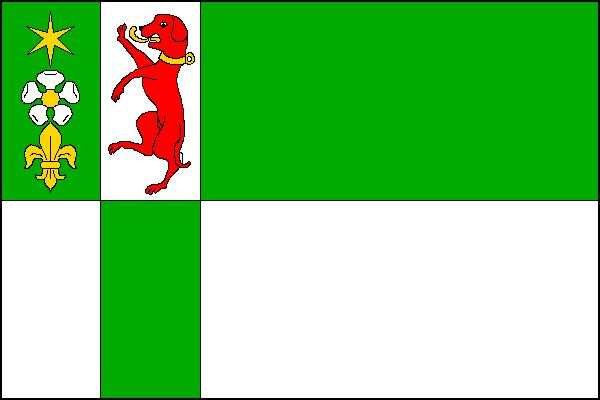
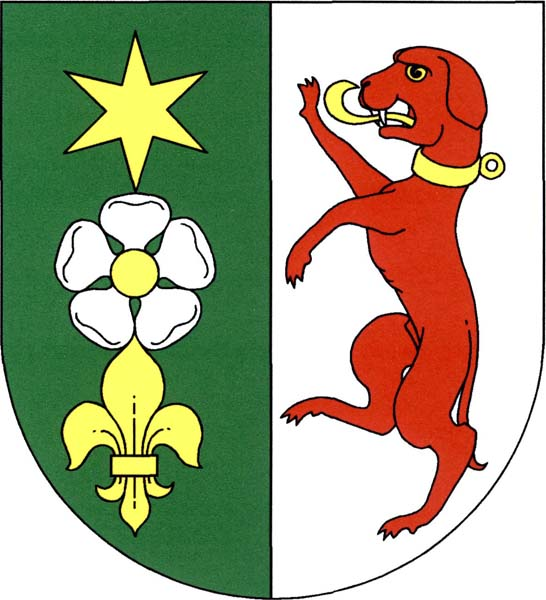
- Flag Coat of arms

- Location in the Czech Republic
- Coordinates: 50°29′10″N 13°18′6″E
- Country: Czech Republic
- Region: Ústí nad Labem
- District: Chomutov
- First mentioned: 1281

Area
  - Total: 30.33 km^{2} (11.71 sq mi)
- Elevation: 725 m (2,379 ft)

Population (2026-01-01)
  - Total: 443
  - Density: 14.6/km^{2} (37.8/sq mi)
- Time zone: UTC+1 (CET)
  - Summer (DST): UTC+2 (CEST)
- Postal code: 430 01
- Website: www.krimov.cz

Křimov (German: Krima) is a municipality and village in Chomutov District in the Ústí nad Labem Region of the Czech Republic. It has about 400 inhabitants.

Křimov lies approximately 8 kilometres (5 mi) west of Chomutov, 57 km (35 mi) west of Ústí nad Labem, and 92 km (57 mi) north-west of Prague.

== Administrative division ==
Křimov consists of nine municipal parts (in brackets population according to the 2021 census):

- Křimov (149)
- Celná (14)
- Domina (36)
- Krásná Lípa (82)
- Menhartice (0)
- Nebovazy (3)
- Stráž (4)
- Strážky (51)
- Suchdol (43)

== Demographics ==
Historical population
Year	Pop.	±%
1869	1,711	—
1880	1,683	−1.6%
1890	1,705	+1.3%
1900	1,575	−7.6%
1910	1,506	−4.4%
1921	1,484	−1.5%
1930	1,588	+7.0%
1950	468	−70.5%
1961	402	−14.1%
1970	322	−19.9%
1980	199	−38.2%
1991	99	−50.3%
2001	152	+53.5%
2011	312	+105.3%
2021	382	+22.4%
Source: Censuses
