= Málkov (Chomutov District) =

- Municipality
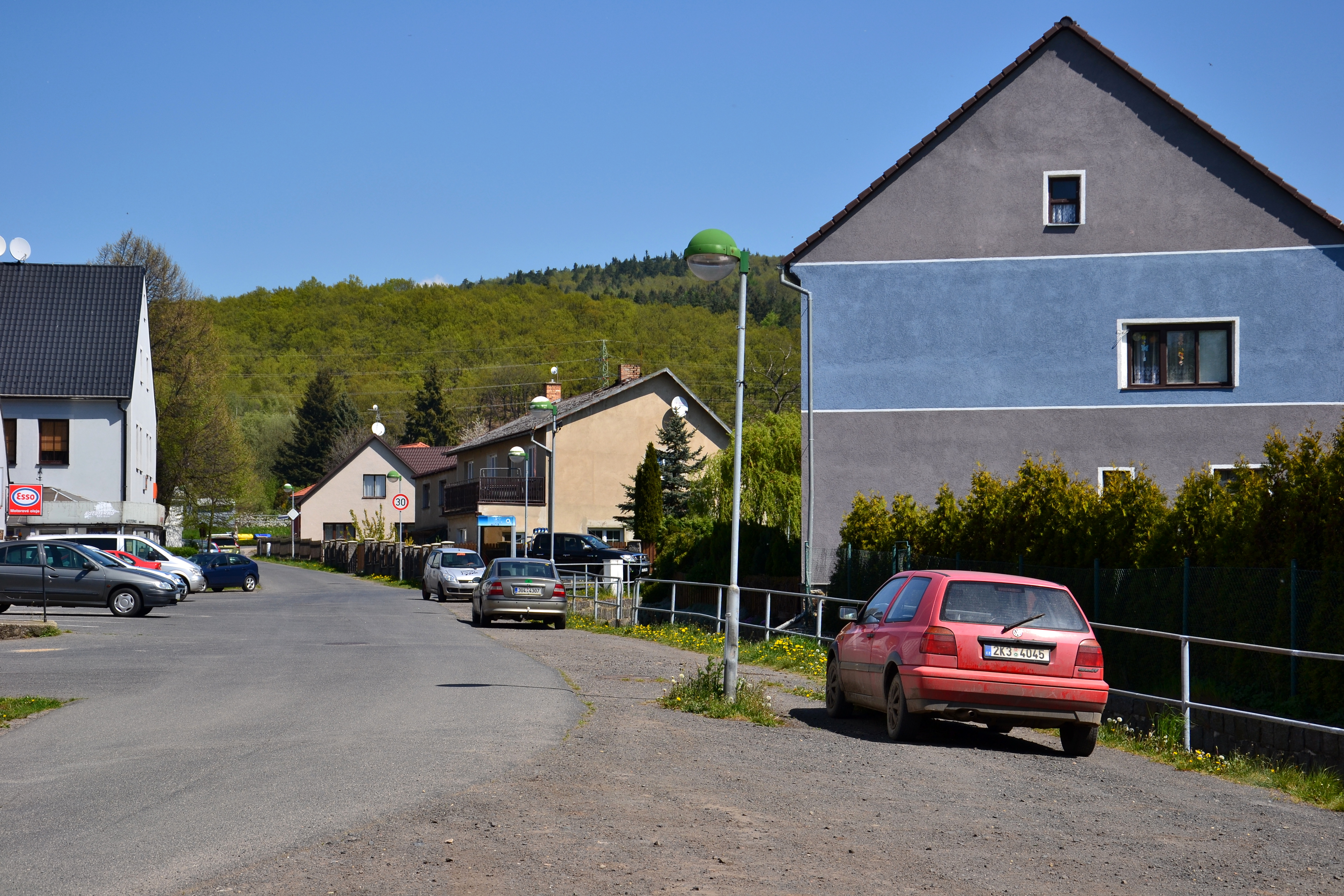
- Centre of Málkov

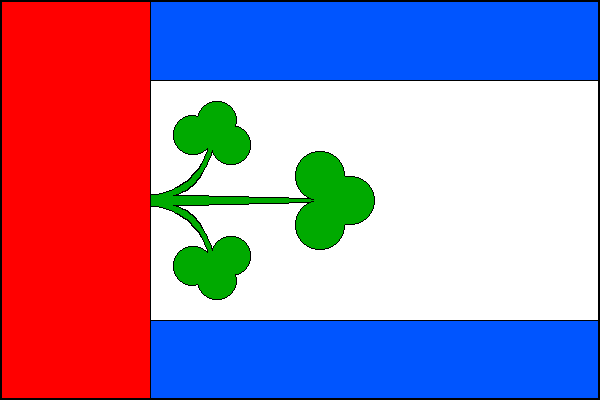
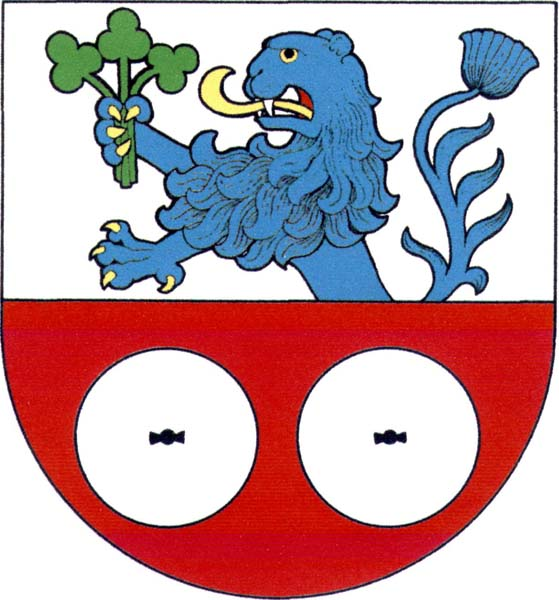
- Flag Coat of arms

- Location in the Czech Republic
- Coordinates: 50°26′47″N 13°20′0″E
- Country: Czech Republic
- Region: Ústí nad Labem
- District: Chomutov
- First mentioned: 1361

Area
  - Total: 21.89 km^{2} (8.45 sq mi)
- Elevation: 400 m (1,300 ft)

Population (2026-01-01)
  - Total: 1,028
  - Density: 46.96/km^{2} (121.6/sq mi)
- Time zone: UTC+1 (CET)
  - Summer (DST): UTC+2 (CEST)
- Postal codes: 430 01, 431 02
- Website: www.malkov.cz

Málkov (German: Malkau) is a municipality and village in Chomutov District in the Ústí nad Labem Region of the Czech Republic. It has about 1,000 inhabitants.

== Administrative division ==
Málkov consists of four municipal parts (in brackets population according to the 2021 census):

- Málkov (219)
- Lideň (19)
- Vysoká (31)
- Zelená (659)

== Demographics ==
Historical population
| Year | Pop. | ±% |
|---|---|---|
| 1869 | 1,943 | — |
| 1880 | 2,088 | +7.5% |
| 1890 | 2,102 | +0.7% |
| 1900 | 2,315 | +10.1% |
| 1910 | 2,336 | +0.9% |
| 1921 | 2,607 | +11.6% |
| 1930 | 2,800 | +7.4% |
| 1950 | 1,791 | −36.0% |
| 1961 | 1,736 | −3.1% |
| 1970 | 1,404 | −19.1% |
| 1980 | 657 | −53.2% |
| 1991 | 473 | −28.0% |
| 2001 | 497 | +5.1% |
| 2011 | 664 | +33.6% |
| 2021 | 928 | +39.8% |
Source: Censuses
