= Lovečkovice =

- Municipality
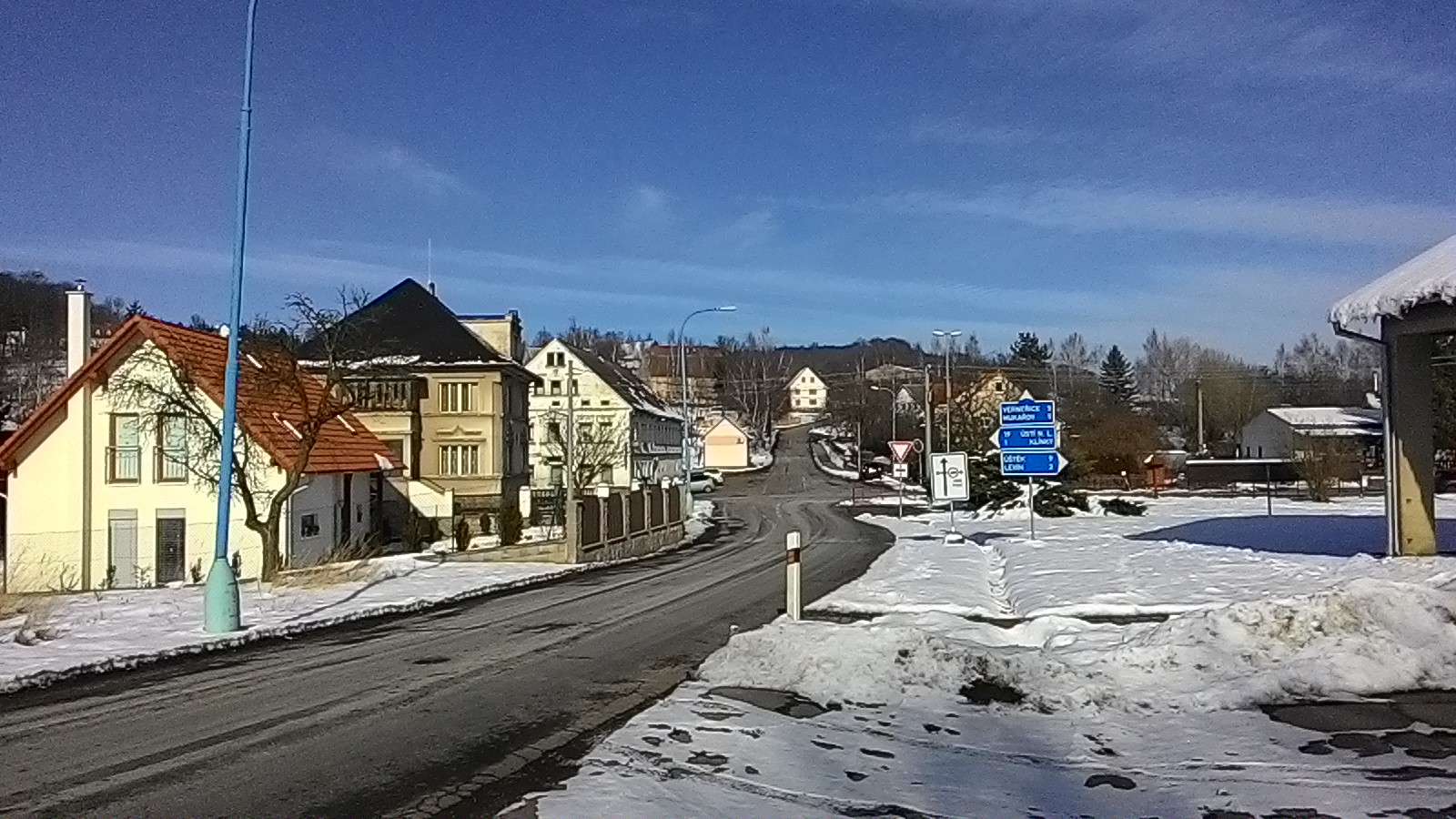
- Crossroads in Lovečkovice

- Flag Coat of arms

- Location in the Czech Republic
- Coordinates: 50°37′18″N 14°15′48″E
- Country: Czech Republic
- Region: Ústí nad Labem
- District: Litoměřice
- First mentioned: 1396

Area
  - Total: 22.72 km^{2} (8.77 sq mi)
- Elevation: 437 m (1,434 ft)

Population (2026-01-01)
  - Total: 617
  - Density: 27.2/km^{2} (70.3/sq mi)
- Time zone: UTC+1 (CET)
  - Summer (DST): UTC+2 (CEST)
- Postal codes: 411 45, 412 01
- Website: www.obecloveckovice.cz

Lovečkovice is a municipality and village in Litoměřice District in the Ústí nad Labem Region of the Czech Republic. It has about 600 inhabitants.

== Administrative division ==
Lovečkovice consists of eight municipal parts (in brackets population according to the 2021 census):

- Lovečkovice (268)
- Dolní Šebířov (20)
- Hlupice (9)
- Knínice (61)
- Levínské Petrovice (23)
- Mukařov (66)
- Náčkovice (56)
- Touchořiny (90)

== Etymology ==
The name Lovečkovice is derived from the personal name Loveček, meaning "the village of Loveček's people".

== Geography ==
Lovečkovice is located about 13 kilometres (8 mi) northeast of Litoměřice and 16 km (10 mi) east of Ústí nad Labem. It lies in the Central Bohemian Uplands and within the České středohoří Protected Landscape Area. The highest point is at 639 m (2,096 ft) above sea level. The stream Luční potok originates here and flows across the municipality.

== History ==
The first written mention of Lovečkovice is from 1396. The village was a part of the Zahořany estate and shared its owners. From the beginning of the 17th century, the estate was owned by the Kinsky family.

== Demographics ==
Historical population

Year	Pop.	±%
1869	2,396	—
1880	2,311	−3.5%
1890	2,306	−0.2%
1900	2,153	−6.6%
1910	2,157	+0.2%

Year	Pop.	±%
1921	2,025	−6.1%
1930	1,979	−2.3%
1950	907	−54.2%
1961	703	−22.5%
1970	661	−6.0%

Year	Pop.	±%
1980	590	−10.7%
1991	441	−25.3%
2001	427	−3.2%
2011	477	+11.7%
2021	593	+24.3%

Source: Censuses

== Transport ==
There are no railways or major roads passing through the municipality.

== Sights ==
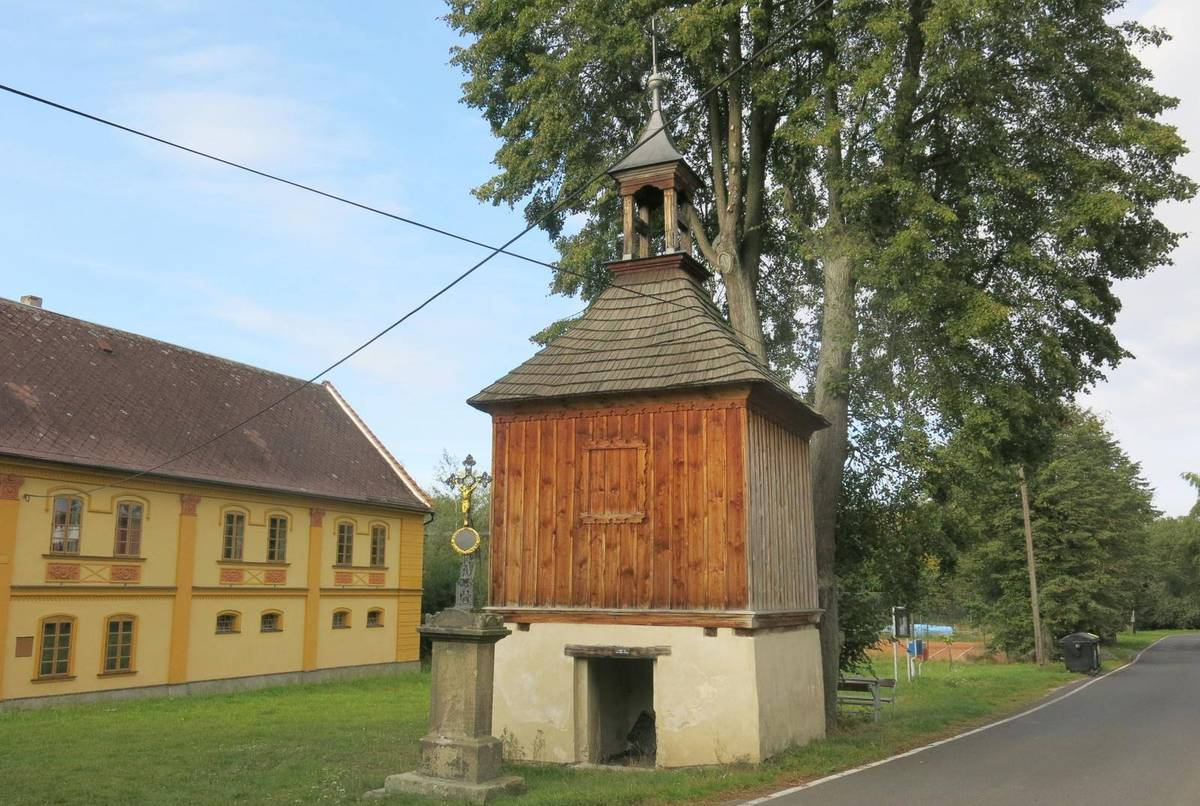
Chapel in Levínské Petrovice

In Levínské Petrovice is a chapel with a belfry. It is a wooden building with a brick foundation. Built probably at the end of the 18th century, it is a belfry typical of this region.

In Mukařov is a Gothic bell tower, which is a remnant of a church from the 14th century. The church disappeared in the 18th century.

A landmark in the centre of Náčkovice is a Baroque chapel. It was built in 1748 and restored in 1855.

An observation tower called Víťova rozhledna was built on an unnamed knoll near Náčkovice in 2003. It is 21 metres (69 ft) high and the viewing platform is at a height of 8.5 metres (28 ft).

The Velké Březno–Lovečkovice railway had a station here from its opening in 1890 until closure in 1978. The track was unique due to its elevation, which replicates the terrain as much as possible. Today the track is protected as a technical monument. The station has been reopened as a museum about the line, which is being restored by volunteers as a heritage railway.
