= Výškov =

- Municipality
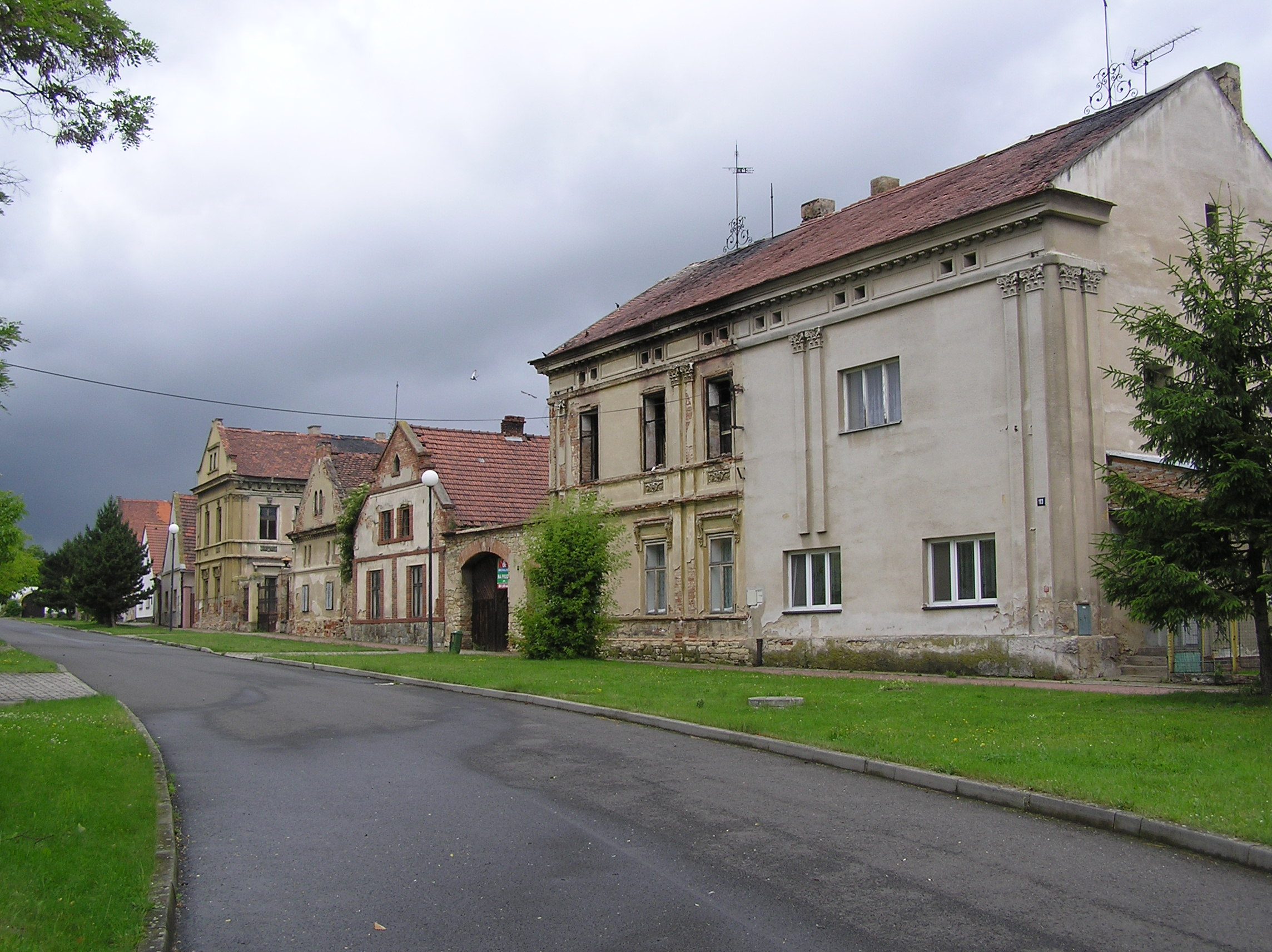
- Centre of Výškov

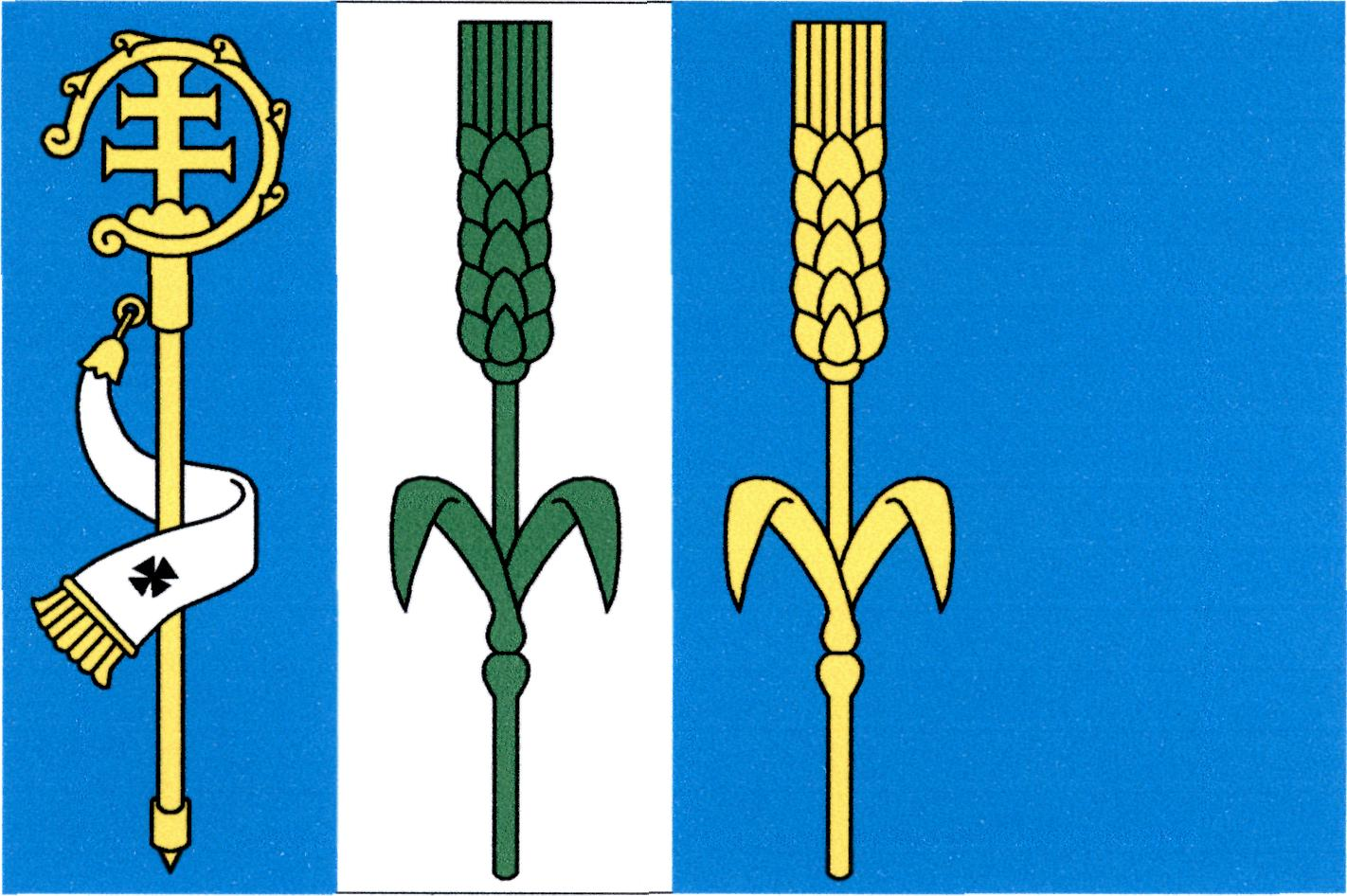
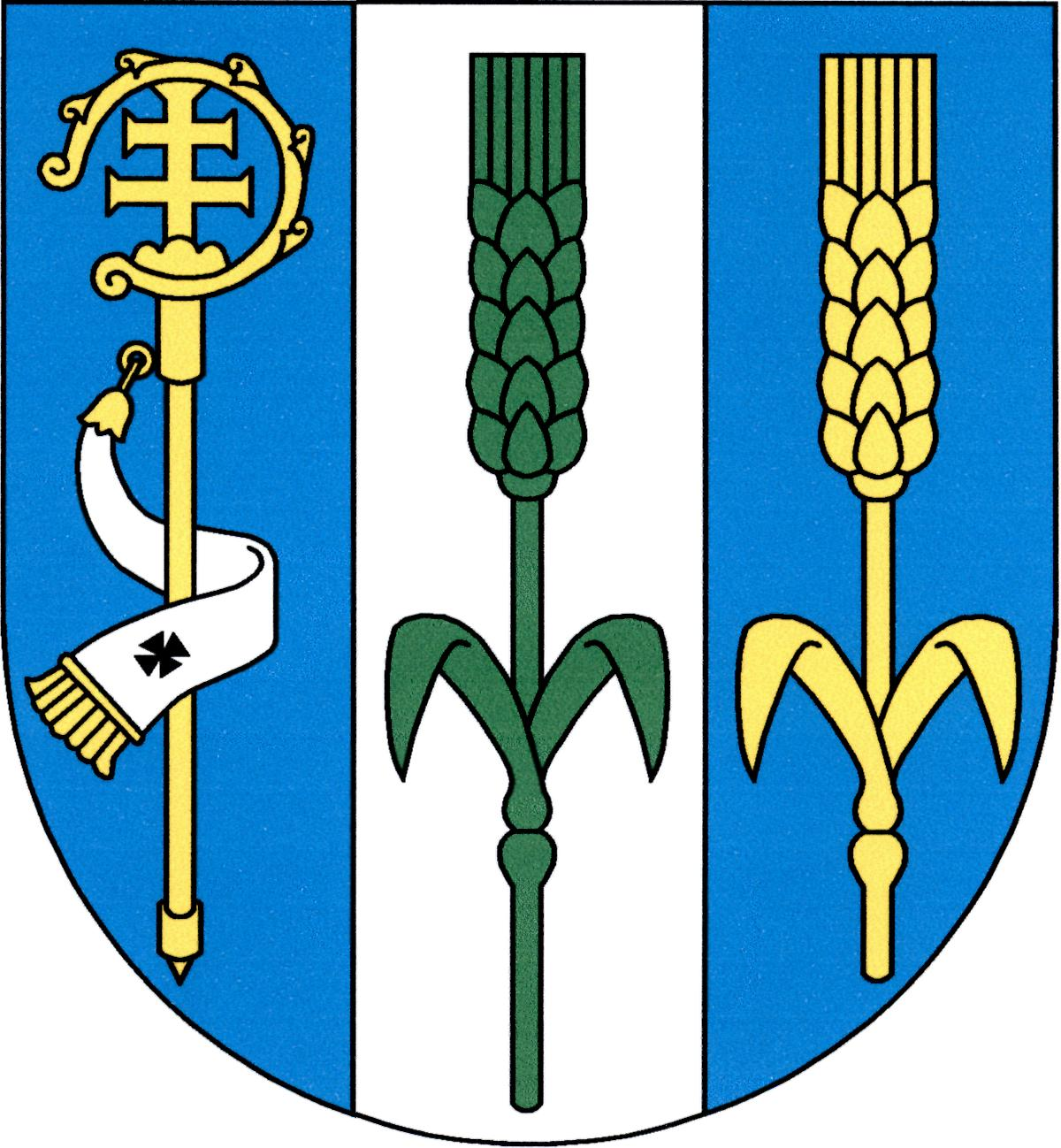
- Flag Coat of arms

- Location in the Czech Republic
- Coordinates: 50°23′44″N 13°40′20″E
- Country: Czech Republic
- Region: Ústí nad Labem
- District: Louny
- First mentioned: 1392

Area
  - Total: 14.31 km^{2} (5.53 sq mi)
- Elevation: 223 m (732 ft)

Population (2026-01-01)
  - Total: 474
  - Density: 33.1/km^{2} (85.8/sq mi)
- Time zone: UTC+1 (CET)
  - Summer (DST): UTC+2 (CEST)
- Postal code: 440 01
- Website: www.vyskov-obec.cz

Výškov (German: Wischkowa) is a municipality and village in Louny District in the Ústí nad Labem Region of the Czech Republic. It has about 500 inhabitants.

Výškov lies approximately 10 kilometres (6 mi) north-west of Louny, 39 km (24 mi) south-west of Ústí nad Labem, and 63 km (39 mi) north-west of Prague.

== Administrative division ==
Výškov consists of two municipal parts (in brackets population according to the 2021 census):

- Výškov (372)
- Počerady (105)

== Demographics ==
Historical population
Year	Pop.	±%
1869	560	—
1880	600	+7.1%
1890	591	−1.5%
1900	703	+19.0%
1910	853	+21.3%
1921	849	−0.5%
1930	859	+1.2%
1950	639	−25.6%
1961	646	+1.1%
1970	579	−10.4%
1980	448	−22.6%
1991	397	−11.4%
2001	371	−6.5%
2011	506	+36.4%
2021	477	−5.7%
Source: Censuses
