= Bílence =

- Municipality
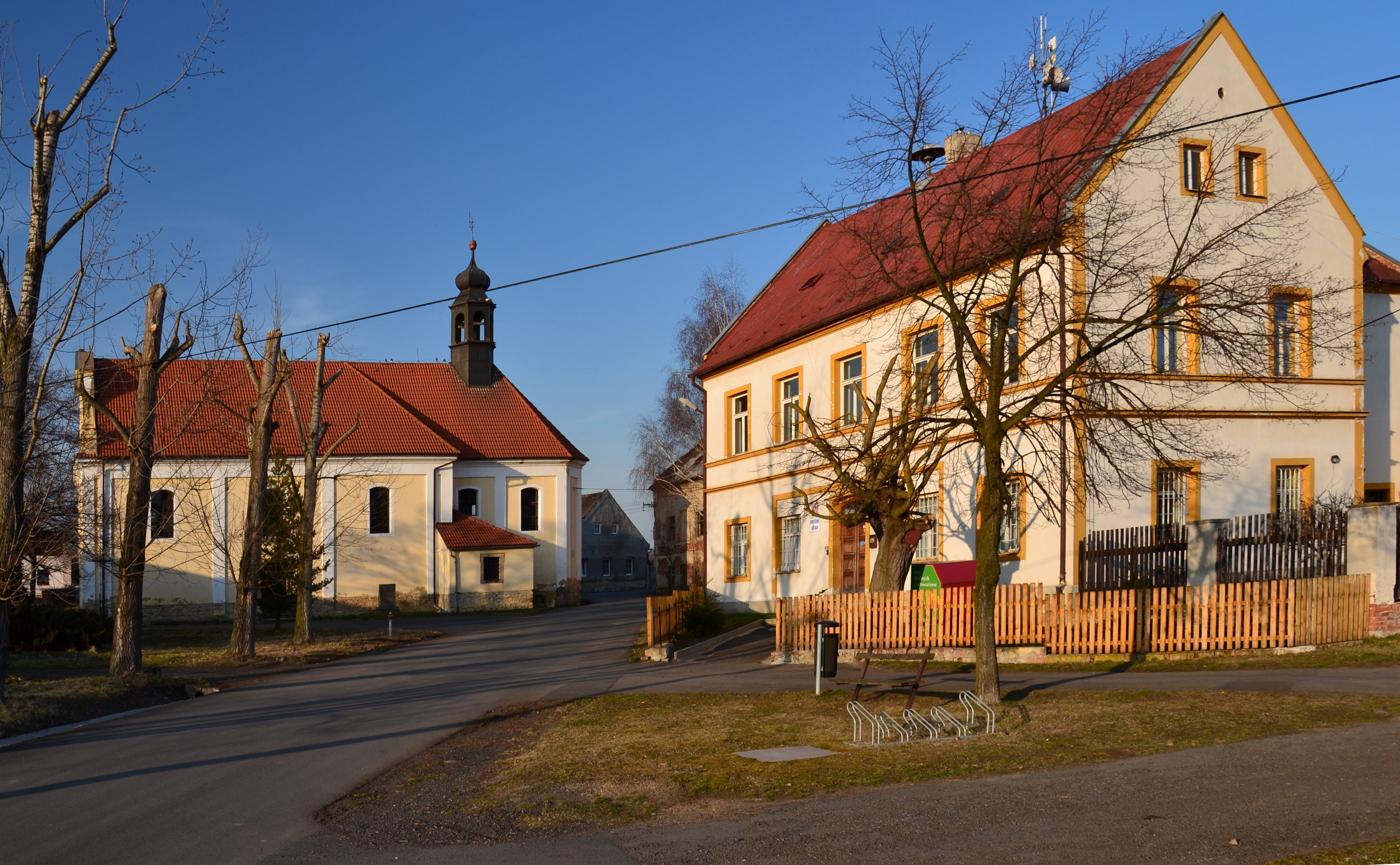
- Municipal office and the Church of Saint Wenceslaus

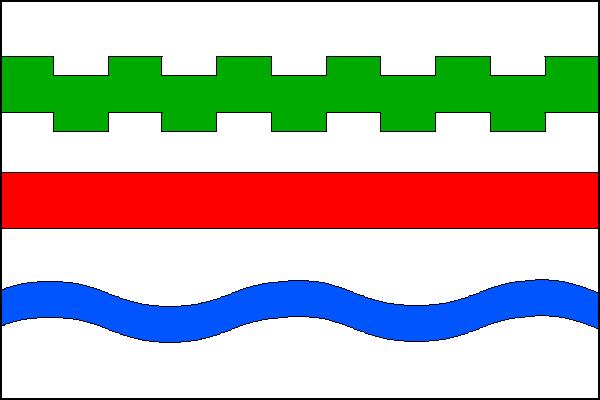
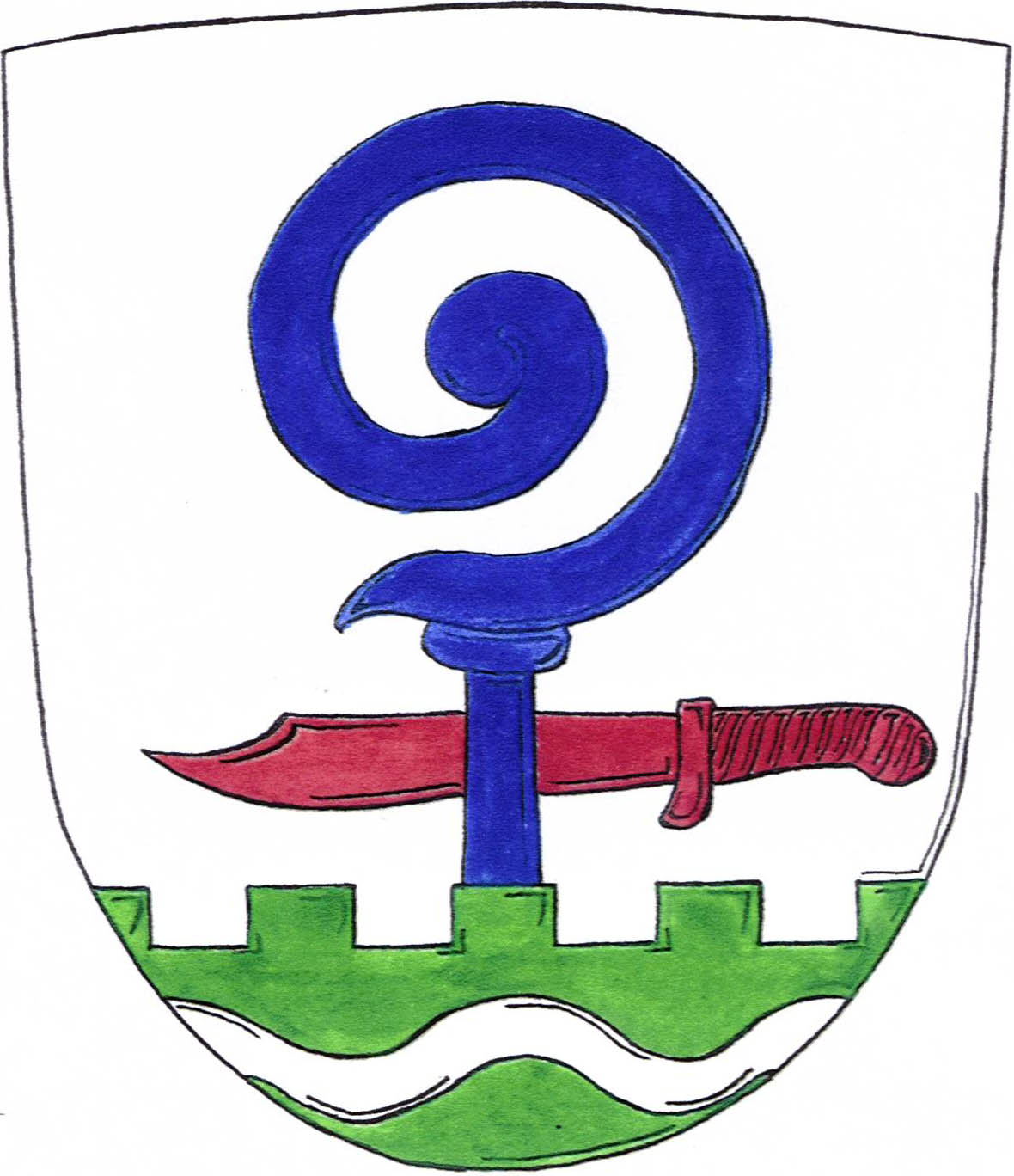
- Flag Coat of arms

- Location in the Czech Republic
- Coordinates: 50°25′29″N 13°30′22″E
- Country: Czech Republic
- Region: Ústí nad Labem
- District: Chomutov
- First mentioned: 1355

Area
  - Total: 12.73 km^{2} (4.92 sq mi)
- Elevation: 262 m (860 ft)

Population (2026-01-01)
  - Total: 262
  - Density: 20.6/km^{2} (53.3/sq mi)
- Time zone: UTC+1 (CET)
  - Summer (DST): UTC+2 (CEST)
- Postal code: 430 01
- Website: www.bilence.cz

Bílence (German: Bielenz) is a municipality and village in Chomutov District in the Ústí nad Labem Region of the Czech Republic. It has about 300 inhabitants.

Bílence lies approximately 9 kilometres (6 mi) south-east of Chomutov, 46 km (29 mi) south-west of Ústí nad Labem, and 76 km (47 mi) north-west of Prague.

== Administrative division ==
Bílence consists of three municipal parts (in brackets population according to the 2021 census):

- Bílence (126)
- Škrle (86)
- Voděrady (16)

== Demographics ==
Historical population
Year	Pop.	±%
1869	844	—
1880	905	+7.2%
1890	900	−0.6%
1900	880	−2.2%
1910	870	−1.1%
1921	931	+7.0%
1930	942	+1.2%
1950	369	−60.8%
1961	385	+4.3%
1970	317	−17.7%
1980	283	−10.7%
1991	188	−33.6%
2001	183	−2.7%
2011	244	+33.3%
2021	228	−6.6%
Source: Censuses
