= Huntířov =

- Municipality
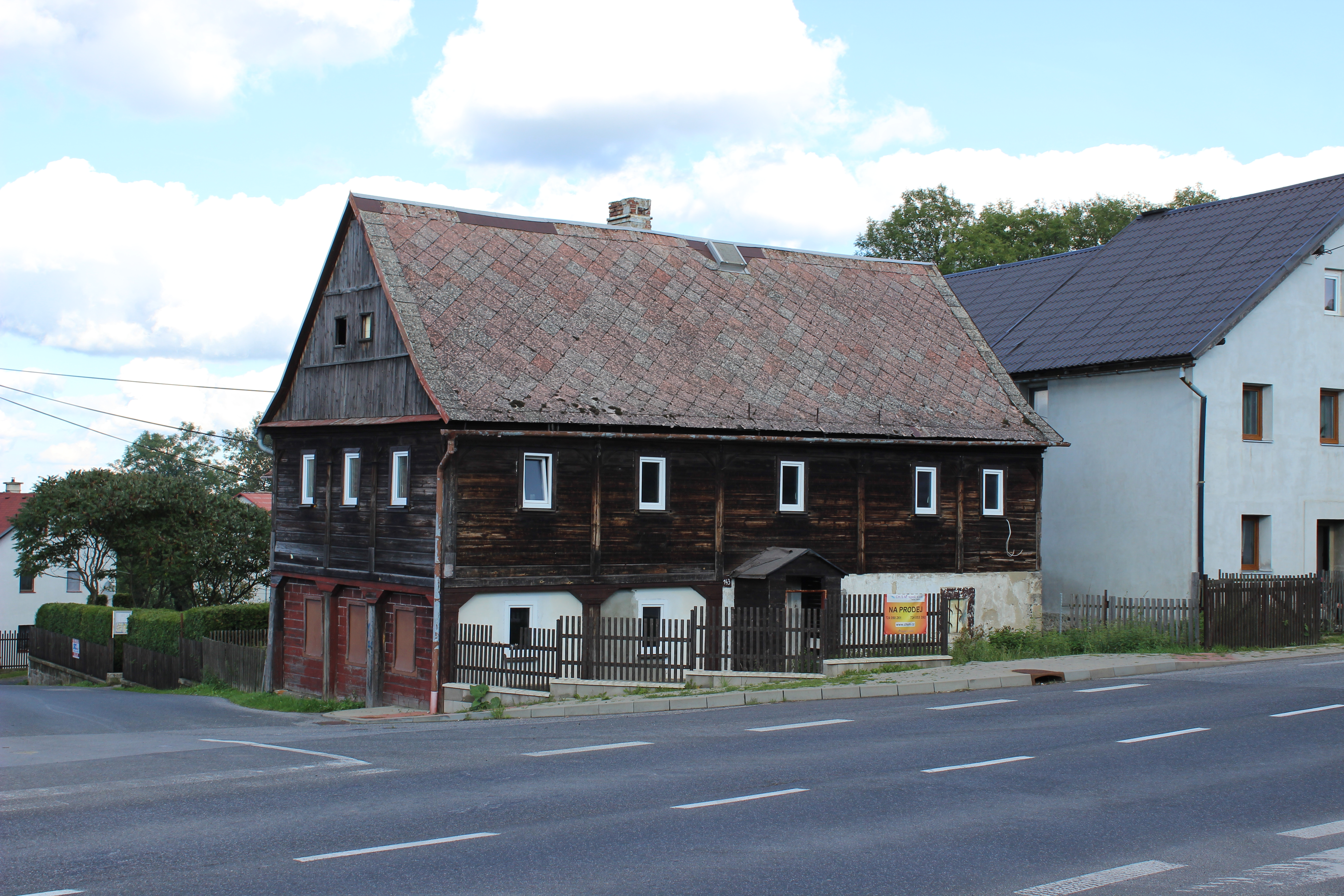
- Upper Lusatian house in Huntířov

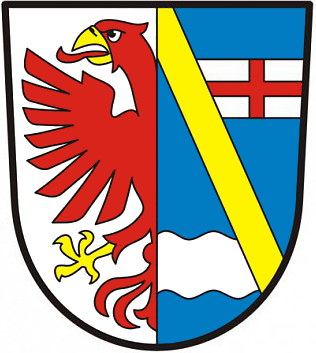
- Coat of arms

- Location in the Czech Republic
- Coordinates: 50°47′22″N 14°18′13″E
- Country: Czech Republic
- Region: Ústí nad Labem
- District: Děčín
- First mentioned: 1352

Area
  - Total: 14.23 km^{2} (5.49 sq mi)
- Elevation: 372 m (1,220 ft)

Population (2026-01-01)
  - Total: 828
  - Density: 58.2/km^{2} (151/sq mi)
- Time zone: UTC+1 (CET)
  - Summer (DST): UTC+2 (CEST)
- Postal code: 405 02
- Website: www.huntirov.cz

Huntířov (German: Güntersdorf) is a municipality and village in Děčín District in the Ústí nad Labem Region of the Czech Republic. It has about 800 inhabitants.

Huntířov lies approximately 10 kilometres (6 mi) north-east of Děčín, 25 km (16 mi) north-east of Ústí nad Labem, and 80 km (50 mi) north of Prague.

== Administrative division ==
Huntířov consists of four municipal parts (in brackets population according to the 2021 census):

- Huntířov (366)
- Františkův Vrch (88)
- Nová Oleška (113)
- Stará Oleška (208)

== Demographics ==
Historical population
Year	Pop.	±%
1869	1,927	—
1880	1,973	+2.4%
1890	1,839	−6.8%
1900	1,733	−5.8%
1910	1,673	−3.5%
1921	1,582	−5.4%
1930	1,663	+5.1%
1950	752	−54.8%
1961	705	−6.2%
1970	631	−10.5%
1980	566	−10.3%
1991	535	−5.5%
2001	697	+30.3%
2011	727	+4.3%
2021	775	+6.6%
Source: Censuses
