= Hlinná =

- Municipality
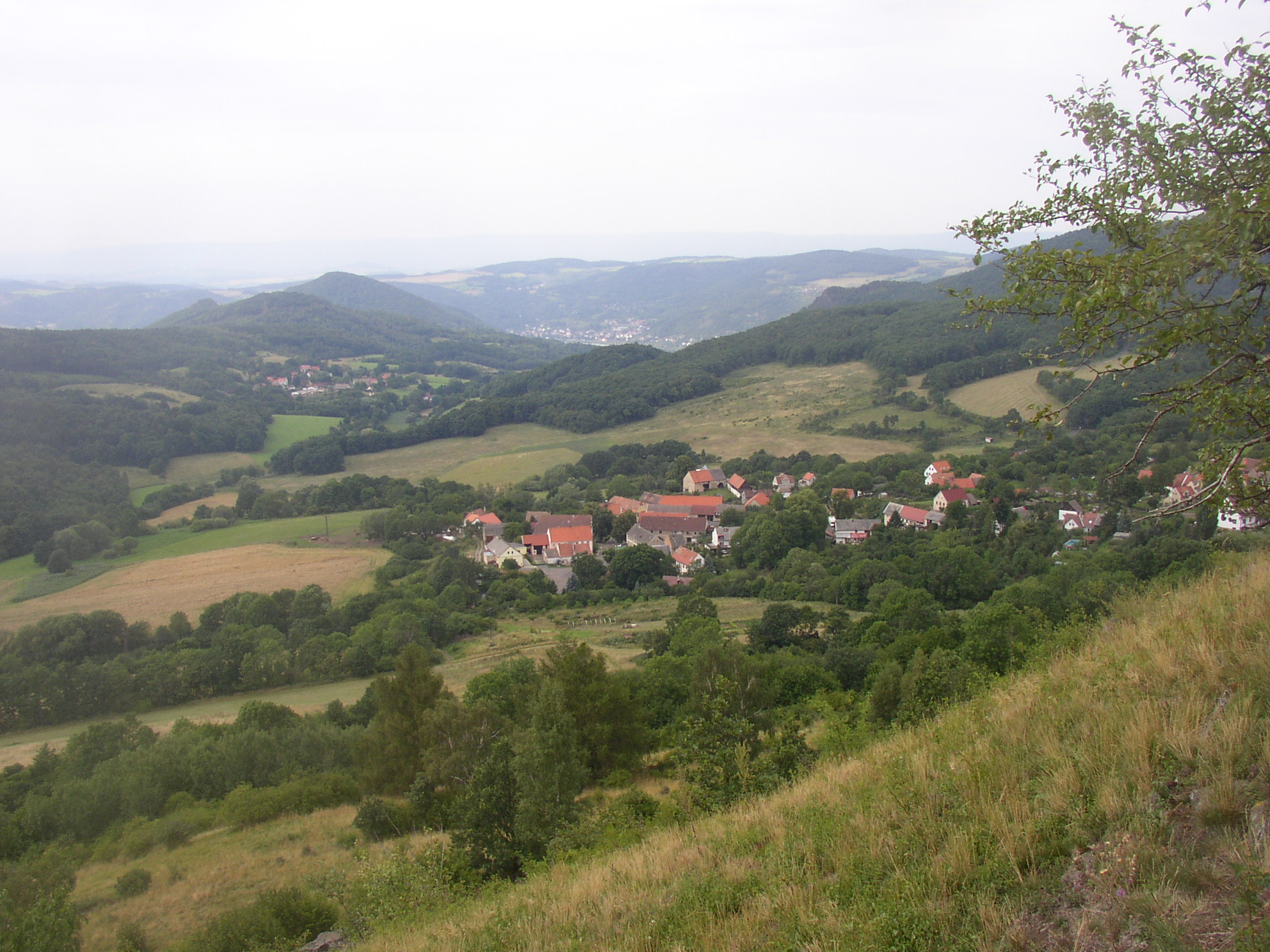
- View from the southeast

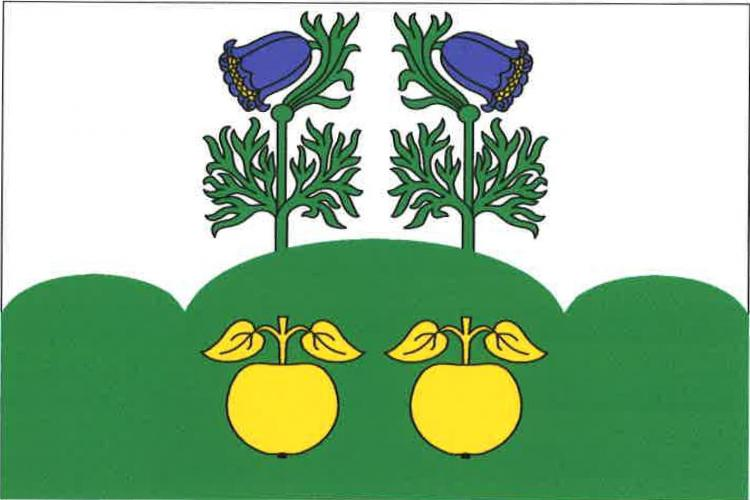
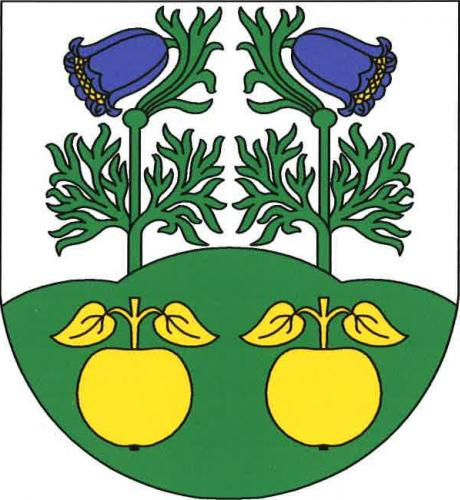
- Flag Coat of arms

- Location in the Czech Republic
- Coordinates: 50°34′21″N 14°6′24″E
- Country: Czech Republic
- Region: Ústí nad Labem
- District: Litoměřice
- First mentioned: 1337

Area
  - Total: 12.01 km^{2} (4.64 sq mi)
- Elevation: 420 m (1,380 ft)

Population (2026-01-01)
  - Total: 293
  - Density: 24.4/km^{2} (63.2/sq mi)
- Time zone: UTC+1 (CET)
  - Summer (DST): UTC+2 (CEST)
- Postal code: 412 01
- Website: hlinna.cz

Hlinná (German: Hlinnay) is a municipality and village in Litoměřice District in the Ústí nad Labem Region of the Czech Republic. It has about 300 inhabitants.

Hlinná lies approximately 5 kilometres (3 mi) north of Litoměřice, 11 km (7 mi) south-east of Ústí nad Labem, and 59 km (37 mi) north-west of Prague.

== Administrative division ==
Hlinná consists of four municipal parts (in brackets population according to the 2021 census):

- Hlinná (127)
- Kundratice (17)
- Lbín (82)
- Tlučeň (71)

== Demographics ==
Historical population
Year	Pop.	±%
1869	1,051	—
1880	1,040	−1.0%
1890	954	−8.3%
1900	916	−4.0%
1910	918	+0.2%
1921	865	−5.8%
1930	879	+1.6%
1950	325	−63.0%
1961	293	−9.8%
1970	200	−31.7%
1980	138	−31.0%
1991	102	−26.1%
2001	147	+44.1%
2011	247	+68.0%
2021	297	+20.2%
Source: Censuses
