= Boleboř =

- Municipality
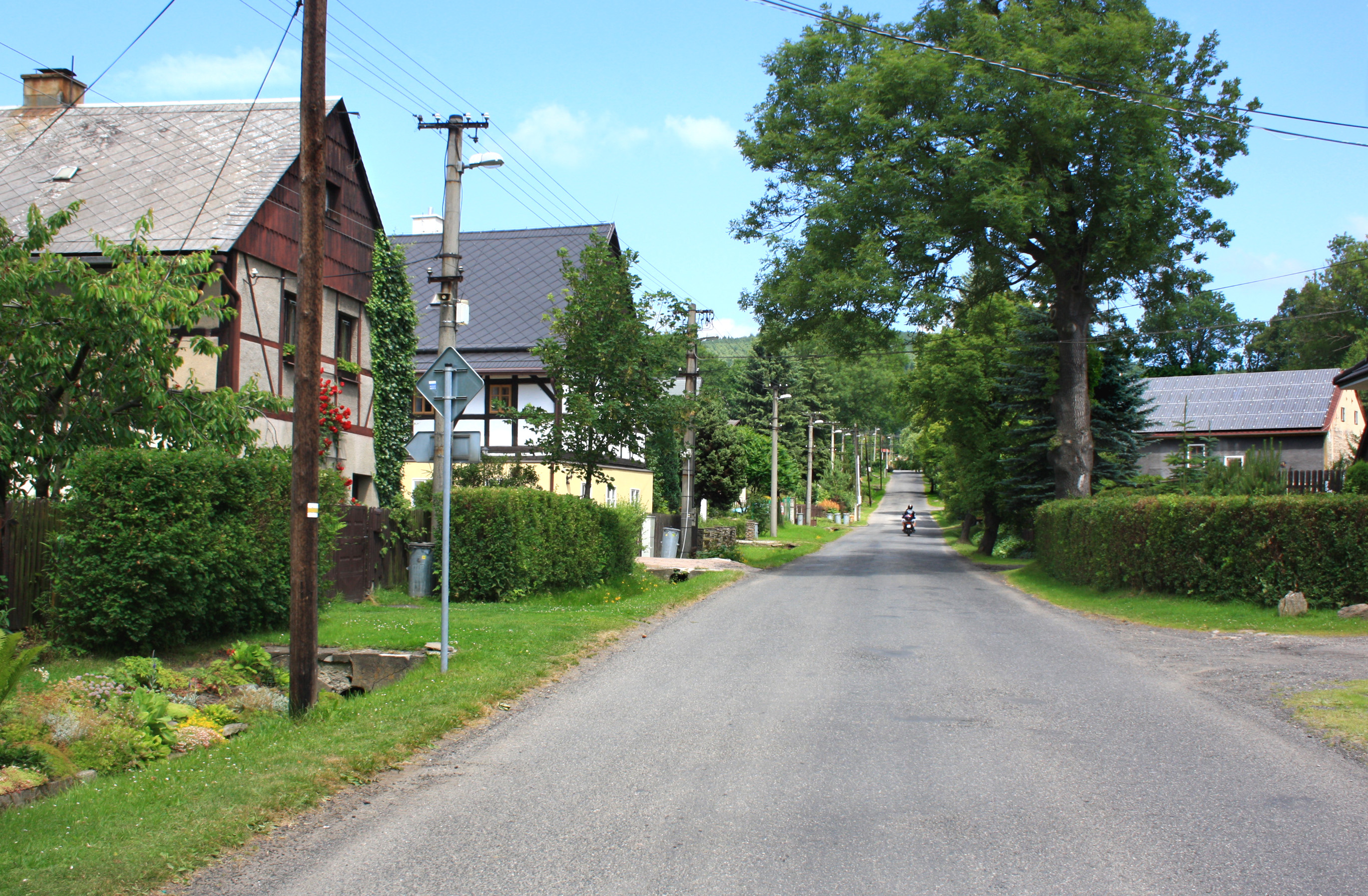
- Main street

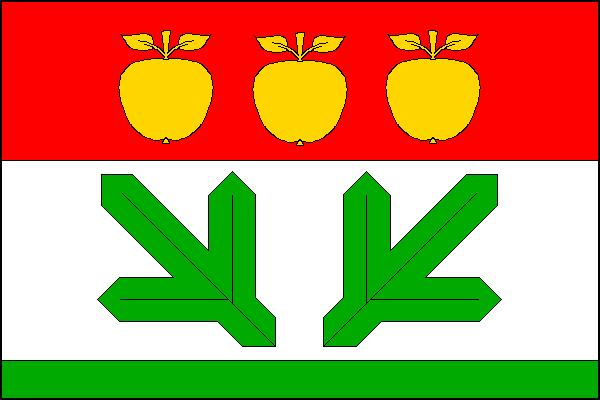
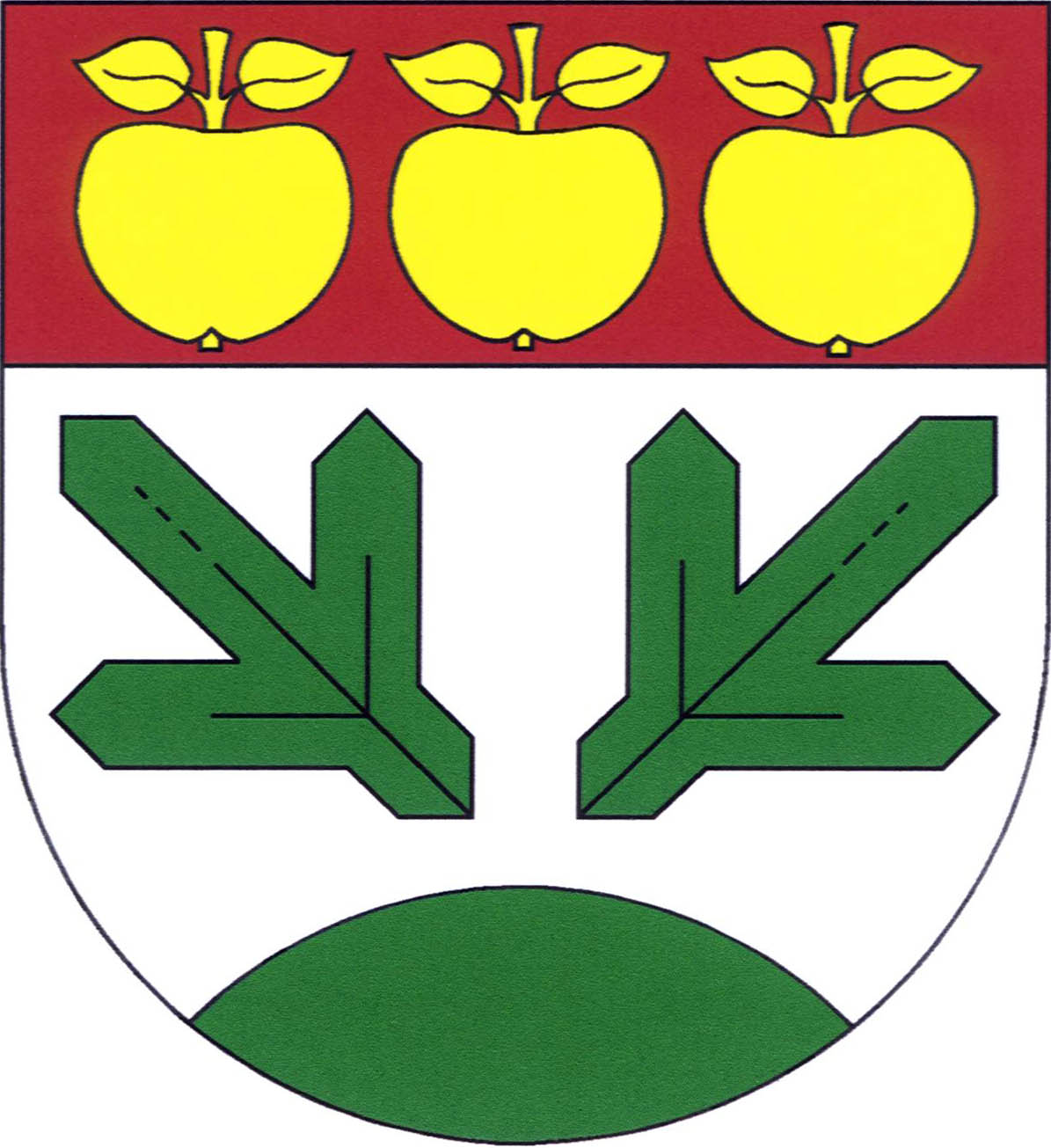
- Flag Coat of arms

- Location in the Czech Republic
- Coordinates: 50°32′25″N 13°24′48″E
- Country: Czech Republic
- Region: Ústí nad Labem
- District: Chomutov
- First mentioned: 1352

Area
  - Total: 20.08 km^{2} (7.75 sq mi)
- Elevation: 620 m (2,030 ft)

Population (2026-01-01)
  - Total: 357
  - Density: 17.8/km^{2} (46.0/sq mi)
- Time zone: UTC+1 (CET)
  - Summer (DST): UTC+2 (CEST)
- Postal code: 431 21
- Website: www.bolebor.cz

Boleboř (German: Göttersdorf) is a municipality and village in Chomutov District in the Ústí nad Labem Region of the Czech Republic. It has about 400 inhabitants.

Boleboř lies approximately 8 kilometres (5 mi) north of Chomutov, 47 km (29 mi) west of Ústí nad Labem, and 88 km (55 mi) north-west of Prague.

== Administrative division ==
Boleboř consists of three municipal parts (in brackets population according to the 2021 census):

- Boleboř (206)
- Orasín (81)
- Svahová (23)

== Demographics ==
Historical population
Year	Pop.	±%
1869	941	—
1880	885	−6.0%
1890	847	−4.3%
1900	826	−2.5%
1910	788	−4.6%
1921	785	−0.4%
1930	788	+0.4%
1950	239	−69.7%
1961	233	−2.5%
1970	277	+18.9%
1980	222	−19.9%
1991	171	−23.0%
2001	194	+13.5%
2011	224	+15.5%
2021	310	+38.4%
Source: Censuses

== Gallery ==
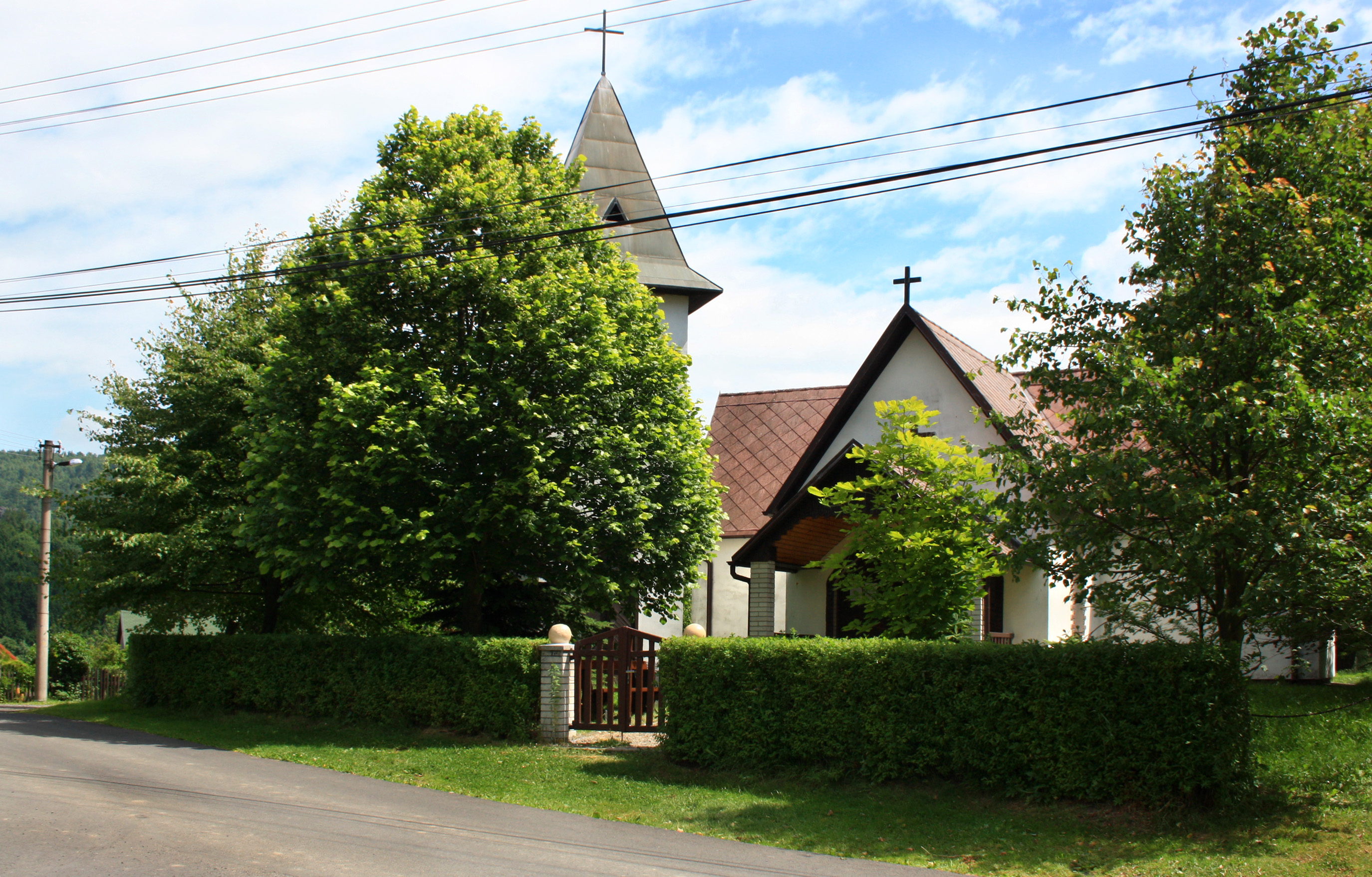
Church of Saint Nicholas

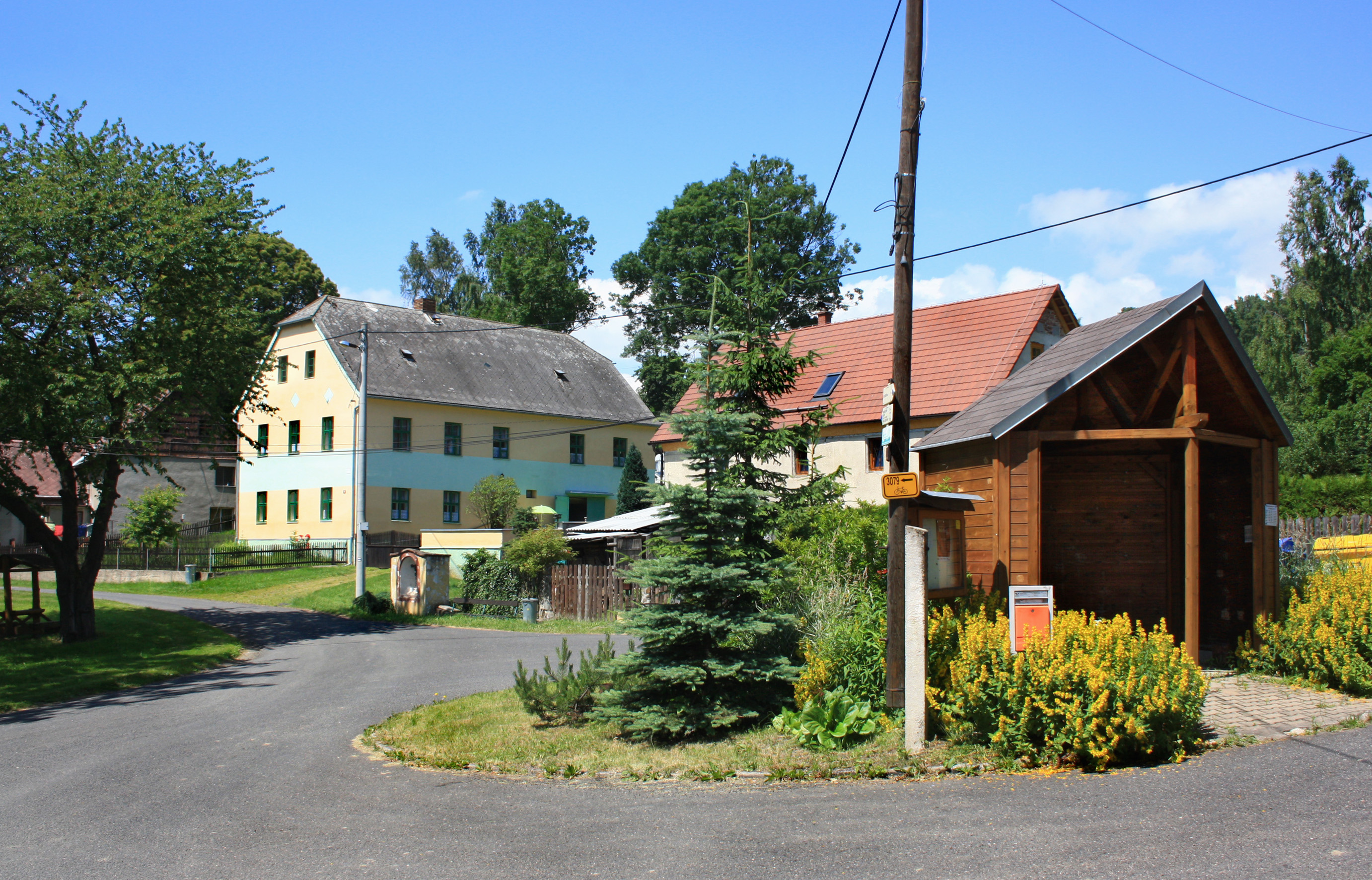
The village of Orasín
