= Březno (Chomutov District) =

- Municipality
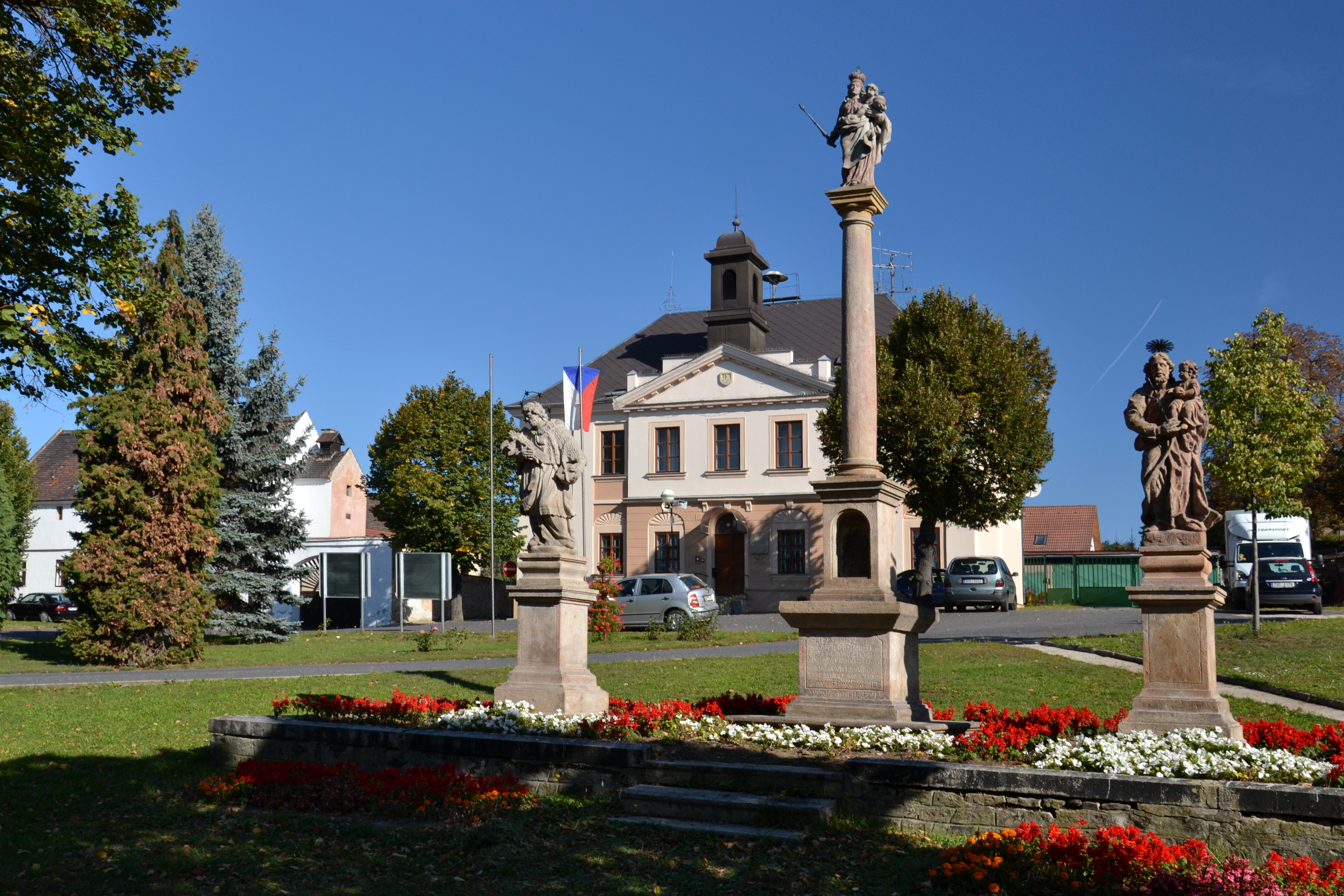
- Municipal office

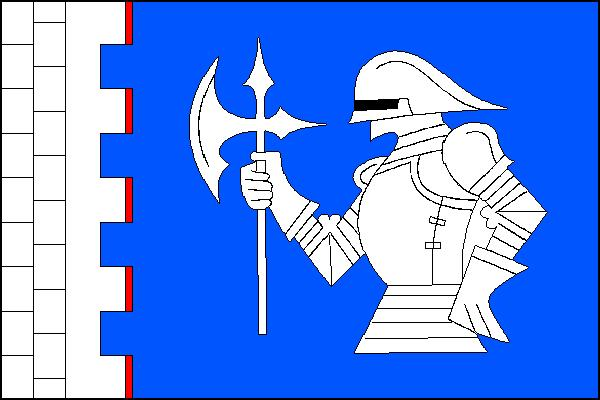
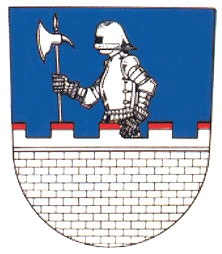
- Flag Coat of arms

- Location in the Czech Republic
- Coordinates: 50°24′7″N 13°25′17″E
- Country: Czech Republic
- Region: Ústí nad Labem
- District: Chomutov
- First mentioned: 1281

Area
  - Total: 46.10 km^{2} (17.80 sq mi)
- Elevation: 280 m (920 ft)

Population (2026-01-01)
  - Total: 1,446
  - Density: 31.37/km^{2} (81.24/sq mi)
- Time zone: UTC+1 (CET)
  - Summer (DST): UTC+2 (CEST)
- Postal code: 431 45
- Website: www.obecbrezno.cz

Březno (German: Priesen) is a municipality and village in Chomutov District in the Ústí nad Labem Region of the Czech Republic. It has about 1,400 inhabitants.

== Administrative division ==
Březno consists of eight municipal parts (in brackets population according to the 2021 census):

- Březno (1,152)
- Denětice (2)
- Holetice (16)
- Kopeček (4)
- Nechranice (79)
- Stranná (26)
- Střezov (100)
- Vičice (31)

== Demographics ==
Historical population
Year	Pop.	±%
1869	2,837	—
1880	3,145	+10.9%
1890	3,168	+0.7%
1900	3,308	+4.4%
1910	3,479	+5.2%
1921	3,604	+3.6%
1930	3,758	+4.3%
1950	2,015	−46.4%
1961	1,961	−2.7%
1970	1,469	−25.1%
1980	1,405	−4.4%
1991	1,134	−19.3%
2001	1,211	+6.8%
2011	1,214	+0.2%
2021	1,410	+16.1%
Source: Censuses

== Transport ==
Březno is located on the railway line Rakovník–Jirkov. The Březno railway tunnel was built on a reallocated train track in 2007. The tunnel is 1,758 m (5,768 ft) long and it was the longest railway tunnel in the Czech Republic until 2018.
