= Velemyšleves =

- Municipality
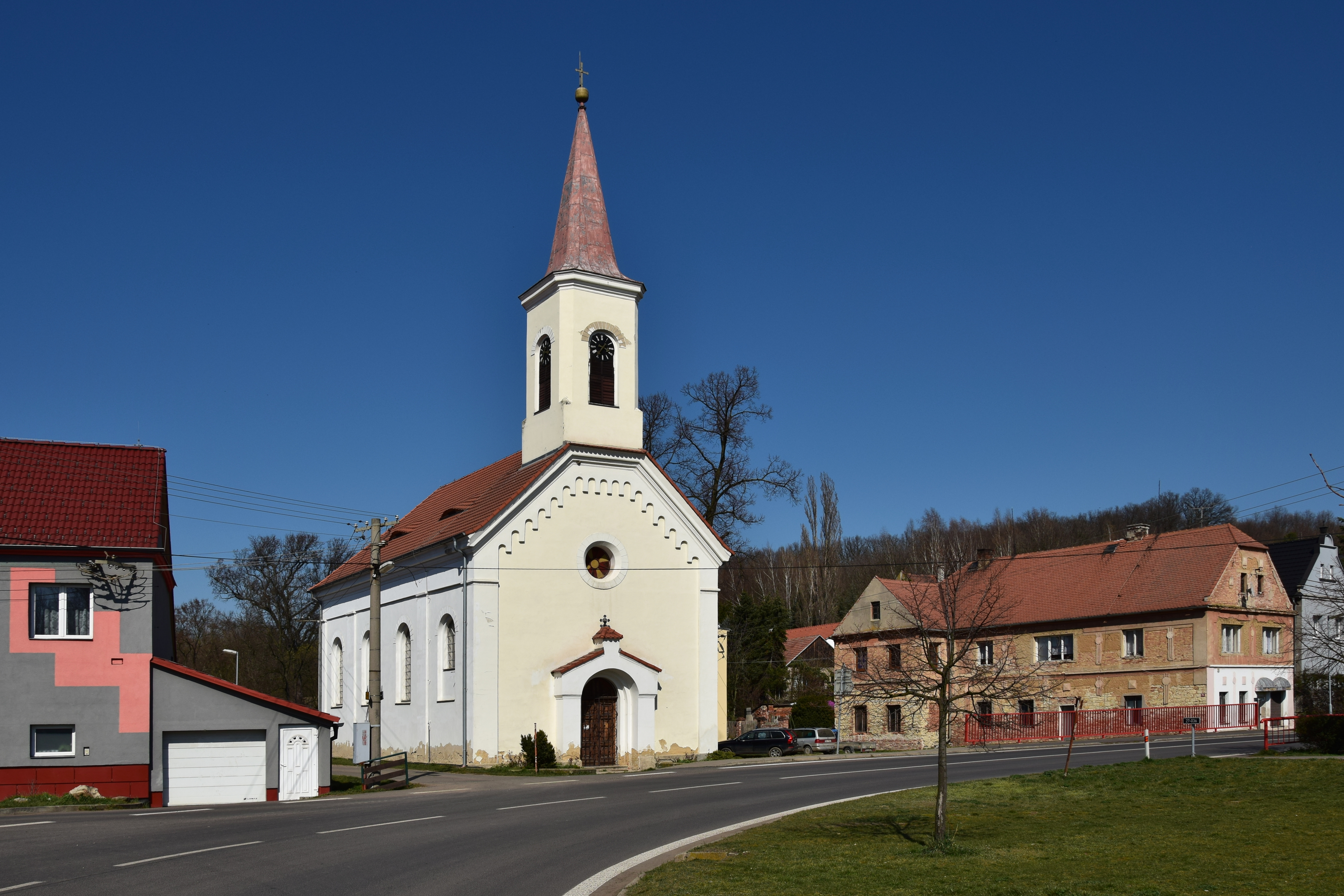
- Chapel of Saint Anthony of Padua

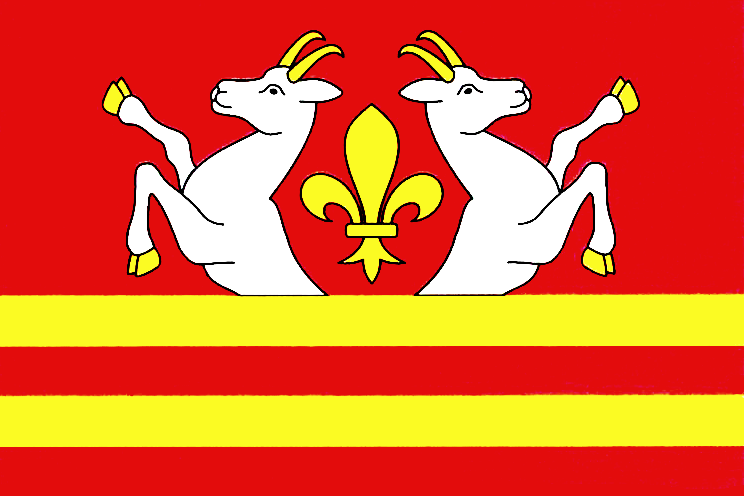
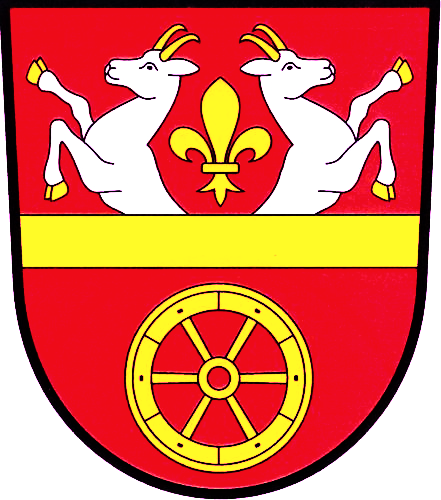
- Flag Coat of arms

- Location in the Czech Republic
- Coordinates: 50°24′10″N 13°33′50″E
- Country: Czech Republic
- Region: Ústí nad Labem
- District: Louny
- First mentioned: 1316

Area
  - Total: 16.42 km^{2} (6.34 sq mi)
- Elevation: 238 m (781 ft)

Population (2026-01-01)
  - Total: 360
  - Density: 22/km^{2} (57/sq mi)
- Time zone: UTC+1 (CET)
  - Summer (DST): UTC+2 (CEST)
- Postal code: 438 01
- Website: www.velemysleves.cz

Velemyšleves (German: Welmschloß) is a municipality and village in Louny District in the Ústí nad Labem Region of the Czech Republic. It has about 400 inhabitants.

Velemyšleves lies approximately 17 kilometres (11 mi) west of Louny, 45 km (28 mi) south-west of Ústí nad Labem, and 70 km (43 mi) north-west of Prague.

== Administrative division ==
Velemyšleves consists of five municipal parts (in brackets population according to the 2021 census):

- Velemyšleves (235)
- Velemyšleves-Průmyslová zóna Triangle (0)
- Minice (25)
- Truzenice (50)
- Zálezly (37)

== Demographics ==
Historical population
Year	Pop.	±%
1869	1,096	—
1880	1,153	+5.2%
1890	1,111	−3.6%
1900	1,158	+4.2%
1910	1,097	−5.3%
1921	1,065	−2.9%
1930	1,079	+1.3%
1950	567	−47.5%
1961	597	+5.3%
1970	449	−24.8%
1980	389	−13.4%
1991	264	−32.1%
2001	290	+9.8%
2011	304	+4.8%
2021	347	+14.1%
Source: Censuses
