= Prackovice nad Labem =

- Municipality
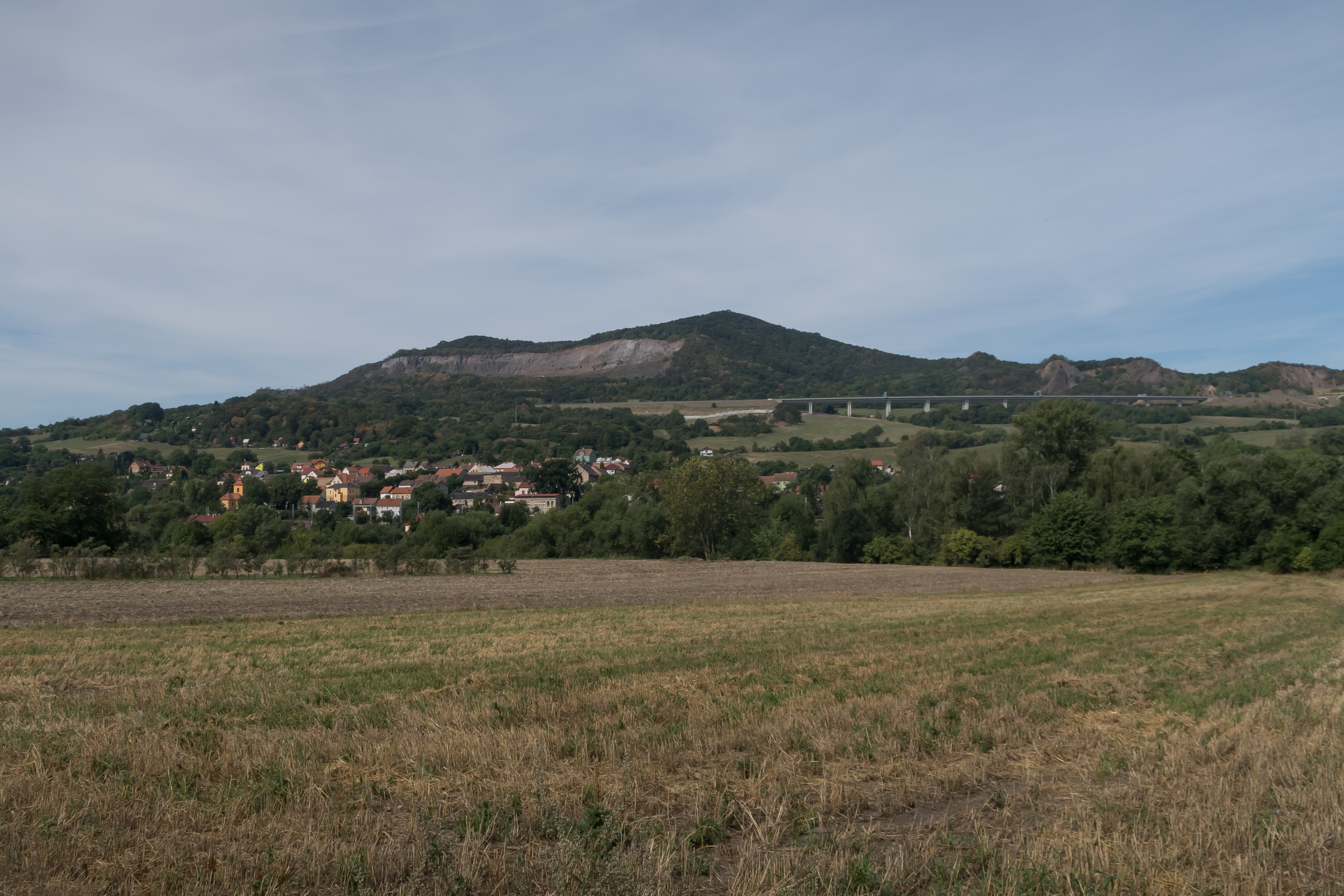
- View from the east

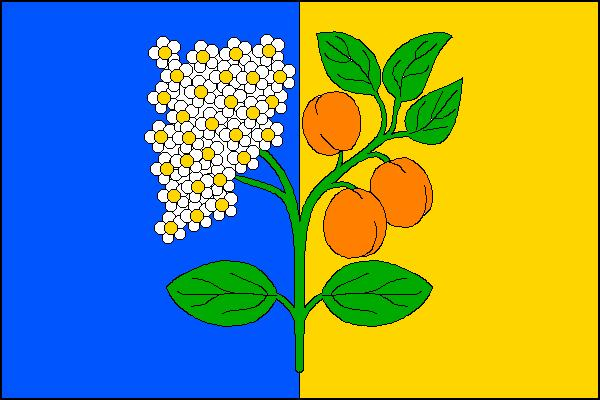
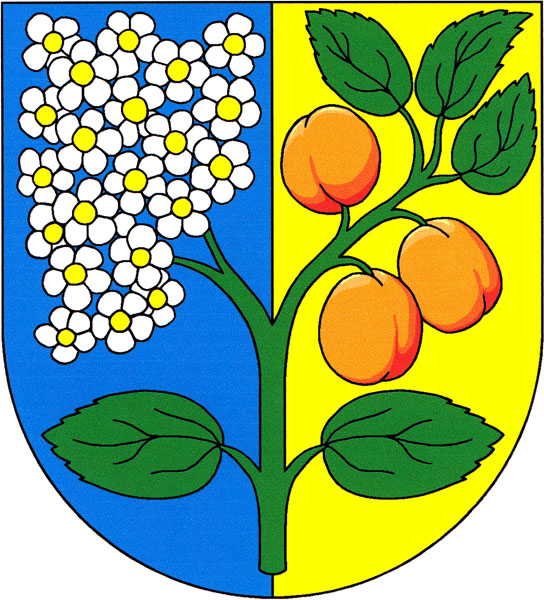
- Flag Coat of arms

- Location in the Czech Republic
- Coordinates: 50°34′10″N 14°1′55″E
- Country: Czech Republic
- Region: Ústí nad Labem
- District: Litoměřice
- First mentioned: 1352

Area
  - Total: 8.08 km^{2} (3.12 sq mi)
- Elevation: 170 m (560 ft)

Population (2026-01-01)
  - Total: 642
  - Density: 79.5/km^{2} (206/sq mi)
- Time zone: UTC+1 (CET)
  - Summer (DST): UTC+2 (CEST)
- Postal code: 411 33
- Website: www.prackovice-litochovice.cz

Prackovice nad Labem is a municipality and village in Litoměřice District in the Ústí nad Labem Region of the Czech Republic. It has about 600 inhabitants.

Prackovice nad Labem lies approximately 8 kilometres (5 mi) north-west of Litoměřice, 10 km (6 mi) south of Ústí nad Labem, and 61 km (38 mi) north-west of Prague.

== Administrative division ==
Prackovice nad Labem consists of two municipal parts (in brackets population according to the 2021 census):

- Prackovice nad Labem (388)
- Litochovice nad Labem (246)

== Demographics ==
Historical population
Year	Pop.	±%
1869	632	—
1880	657	+4.0%
1890	634	−3.5%
1900	768	+21.1%
1910	777	+1.2%
1921	827	+6.4%
1930	898	+8.6%
1950	674	−24.9%
1961	730	+8.3%
1970	679	−7.0%
1980	576	−15.2%
1991	492	−14.6%
2001	507	+3.0%
2011	576	+13.6%
2021	634	+10.1%
Source: Censuses
