= Všestudy (Chomutov District) =

- Municipality
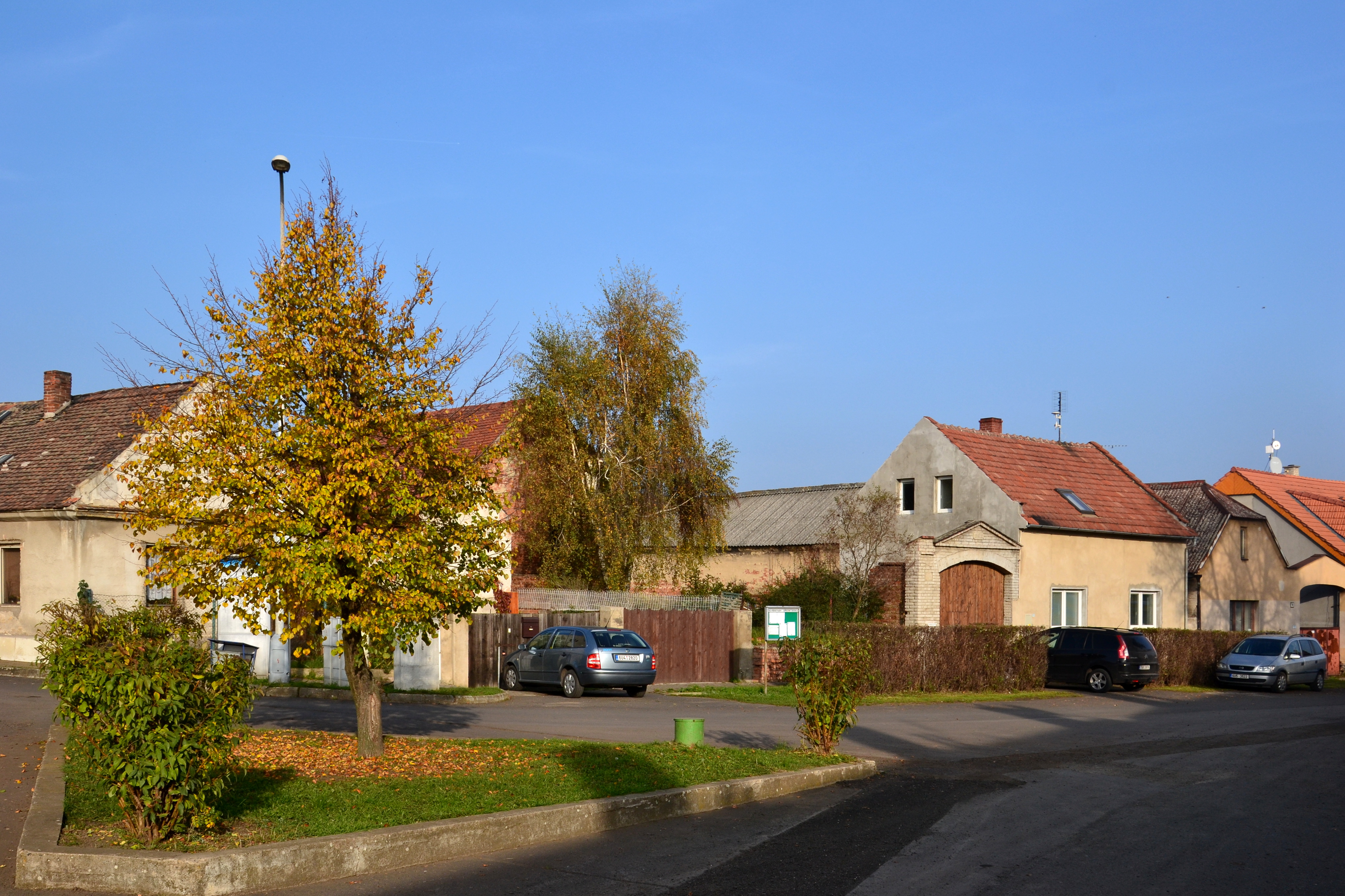
- Centre of Všestudy

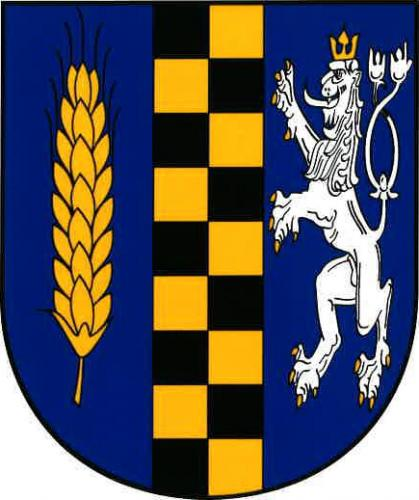
- Flag Coat of arms

- Location in the Czech Republic
- Coordinates: 50°27′27″N 13°30′28″E
- Country: Czech Republic
- Region: Ústí nad Labem
- District: Chomutov
- First mentioned: 1325

Area
  - Total: 5.11 km^{2} (1.97 sq mi)
- Elevation: 317 m (1,040 ft)

Population (2026-01-01)
  - Total: 186
  - Density: 36.4/km^{2} (94.3/sq mi)
- Time zone: UTC+1 (CET)
  - Summer (DST): UTC+2 (CEST)
- Postal code: 431 11
- Website: www.vsestudy.eu

Všestudy (German: Schößl) is a municipality and village in Chomutov District in the Ústí nad Labem Region of the Czech Republic. It has about 200 inhabitants.

Všestudy lies approximately 8 kilometres (5 mi) east of Chomutov, 44 km (27 mi) south-west of Ústí nad Labem, and 77 km (48 mi) north-west of Prague.

== Etymology ==
The name is derived from the Czech words vše ('all') and studiti ('be ashamed').

== Demographics ==
Historical population
Year	Pop.	±%
1869	255	—
1880	281	+10.2%
1890	275	−2.1%
1900	291	+5.8%
1910	280	−3.8%
1921	299	+6.8%
1930	312	+4.3%
1950	171	−45.2%
1961	177	+3.5%
1970	138	−22.0%
1980	101	−26.8%
1991	155	+53.5%
2001	178	+14.8%
2011	172	−3.4%
2021	176	+2.3%
Source: Censuses
