= Novosedlice =

- Municipality
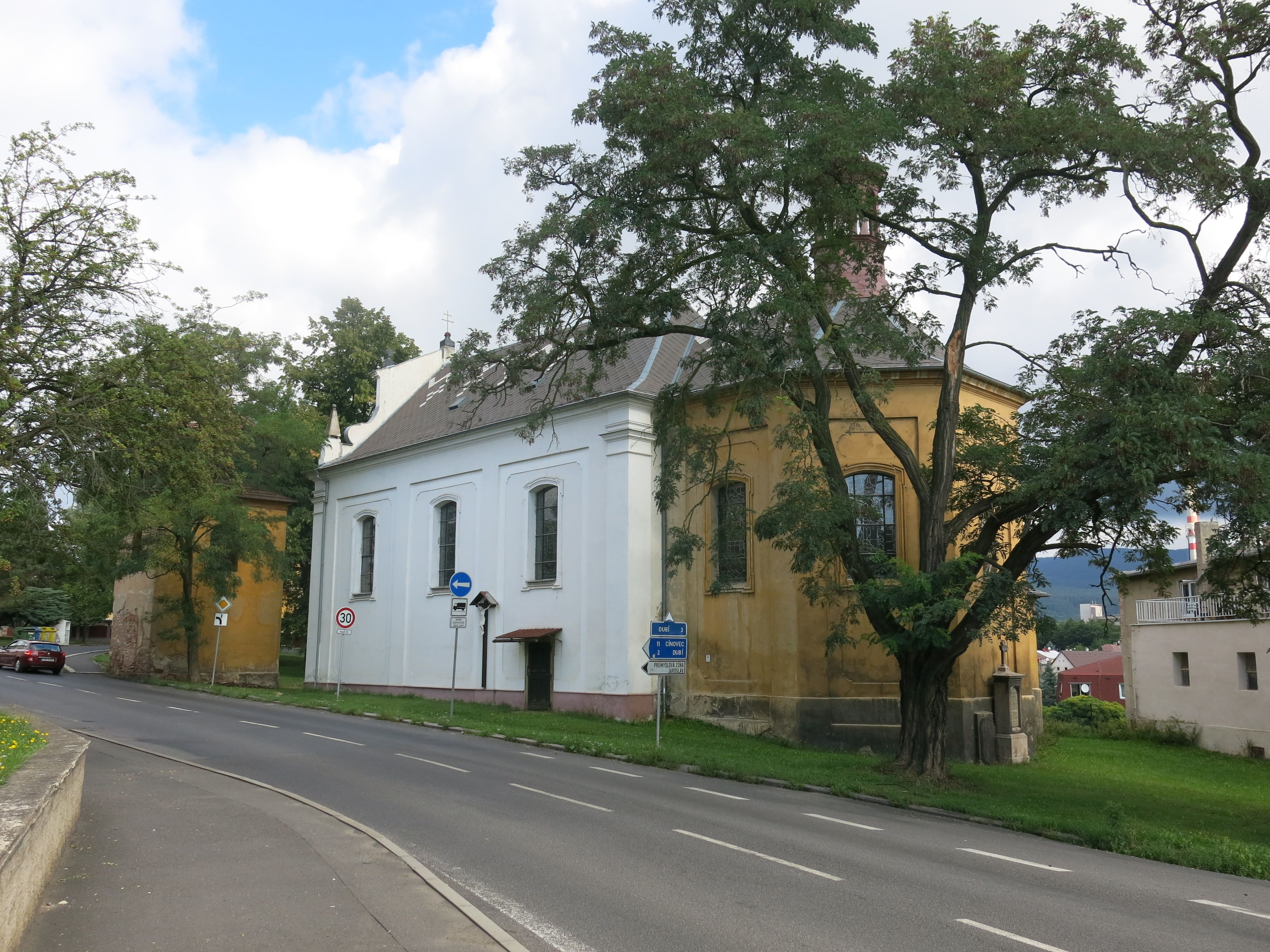
- Church of Saint Valentine

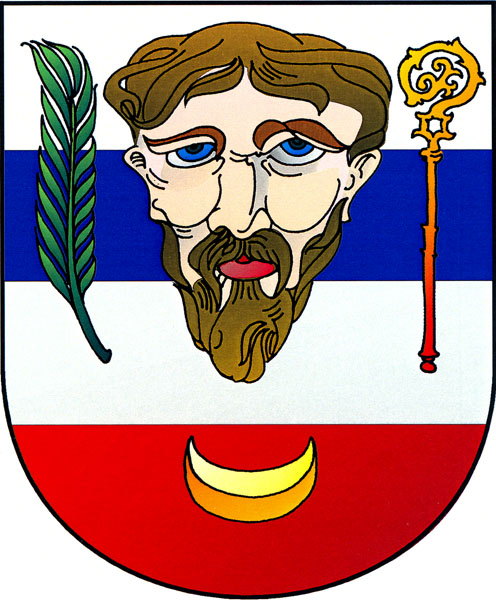
- Flag Coat of arms

- Location in the Czech Republic
- Coordinates: 50°39′23″N 13°49′23″E
- Country: Czech Republic
- Region: Ústí nad Labem
- District: Teplice
- First mentioned: 1126

Area
  - Total: 1.43 km^{2} (0.55 sq mi)
- Elevation: 261 m (856 ft)

Population (2026-01-01)
  - Total: 2,094
  - Density: 1,460/km^{2} (3,790/sq mi)
- Time zone: UTC+1 (CET)
  - Summer (DST): UTC+2 (CEST)
- Postal code: 417 31
- Website: www.novosedlice.cz

Novosedlice (German: Weißkirchlitz) is a municipality and village in Teplice District in the Ústí nad Labem Region of the Czech Republic. It has about 2,100 inhabitants. It is urbanistically fused with the city of Teplice.

== Etymology ==
The name is derived from nové sedlo, meaning 'new village' in old Czech.

== Geography ==
Novosedlice is located about 14 kilometres (9 mi) west of Ústí nad Labem. The municipality is located north of Teplice and is urbanistically fused with this city. It lies in the Most Basin. The highest point is at 293 m (961 ft) above sea level.The Bystřice Stream flows along the northern municipal border.

== History ==
The first written mention of Novosedlice is from 1126.

== Demographics ==
Historical population

Year	Pop.	±%
1869	363	—
1880	585	+61.2%
1890	1,249	+113.5%
1900	3,307	+164.8%
1910	4,842	+46.4%

Year	Pop.	±%
1921	4,642	−4.1%
1930	4,556	−1.9%
1950	3,076	−32.5%
1961	3,191	+3.7%
1970	2,716	−14.9%

Year	Pop.	±%
1980	2,491	−8.3%
1991	1,986	−20.3%
2001	2,154	+8.5%
2011	2,215	+2.8%
2021	2,054	−7.3%

Source: Censuses

== Transport ==
Novosedlice is located on the railway line Děčín–Jeníkov-Oldřichov, but traffic is limited. From March to November, a historic train ČSD Class M 152.0 runs on it on weekends and holidays.

== Sights ==
The main landmark of Novosedlice is the Church of Saint Valentine. It was originally built in the Gothic style in the 14th century, before 1384. In 1710–1711, it was rebuilt in the Baroque style. It is a pilgrimage site.

== Notable people ==
- Gustav Münzberger (1903–1977), German Nazi war criminal
