= Rtyně nad Bílinou =

Municipality in the Czech Republic

- Municipality
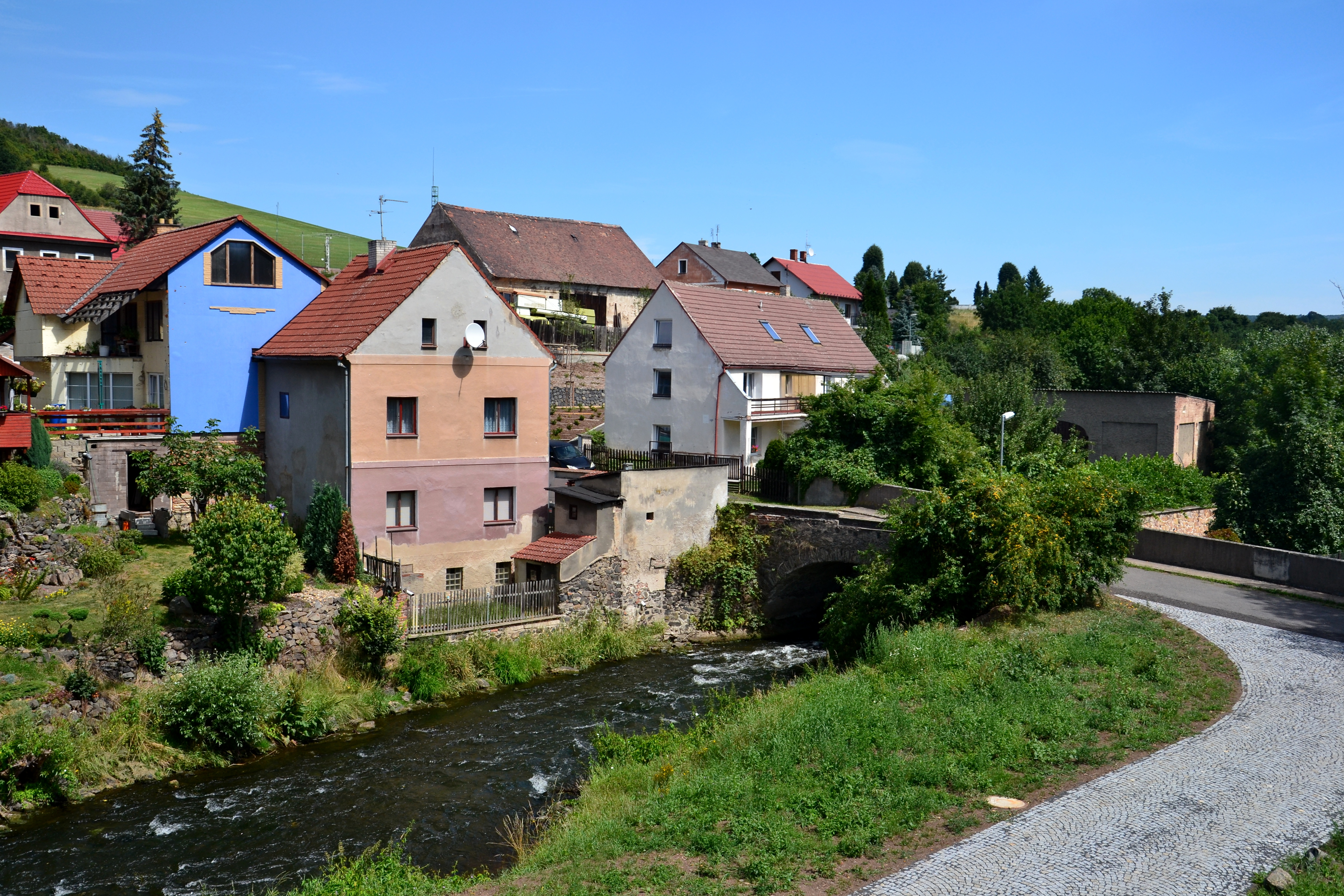
- Houses on the left bank of the Bílina river

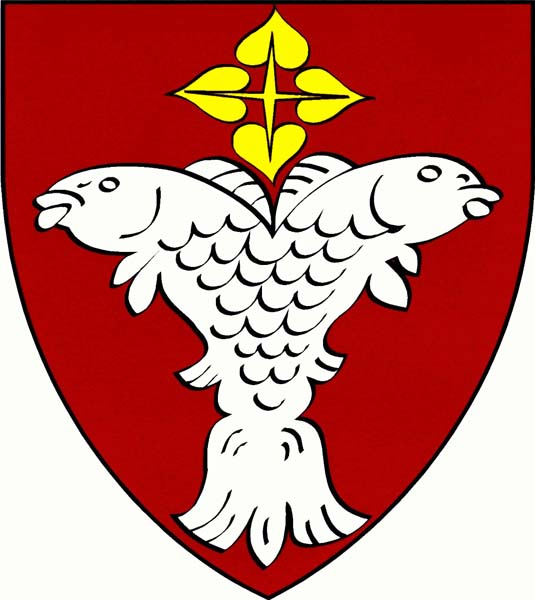
- Flag Coat of arms

- Location in the Czech Republic
- Coordinates: 50°36′13″N 13°54′32″E
- Country: Czech Republic
- Region: Ústí nad Labem
- District: Teplice
- First mentioned: 1333

Area
  - Total: 8.79 km^{2} (3.39 sq mi)
- Elevation: 190 m (620 ft)

Population (2026-01-01)
  - Total: 842
  - Density: 95.8/km^{2} (248/sq mi)
- Time zone: UTC+1 (CET)
  - Summer (DST): UTC+2 (CEST)
- Postal code: 417 62
- Website: www.rtynenadbilinou.cz

Rtyně nad Bílinou (German: Hertine) is a municipality and village in Teplice District in the Ústí nad Labem Region of the Czech Republic. It has about 800 inhabitants. It lies on the Bílina River.

Rtyně nad Bílinou lies approximately 8 kilometres (5 mi) south-east of Teplice, 12 km (7.5 mi) south-west of Ústí nad Labem, and 68 km (42 mi) north-west of Prague.

== Administrative division ==
Rtyně nad Bílinou consists of six municipal parts (in brackets population according to the 2021 census):

- Rtyně nad Bílinou (402)
- Kozlíky (64)
- Malhostice (63)
- Sezemice (120)
- Velvěty (107)
- Vrahožily (39)

== Demographics ==
Historical population
Year	Pop.	±%
1869	979	—
1880	1,275	+30.2%
1890	1,165	−8.6%
1900	1,402	+20.3%
1910	1,780	+27.0%
1921	1,922	+8.0%
1930	2,039	+6.1%
1950	1,445	−29.1%
1961	1,143	−20.9%
1970	1,028	−10.1%
1980	858	−16.5%
1991	658	−23.3%
2001	689	+4.7%
2011	792	+14.9%
2021	795	+0.4%
Source: Censuses
