= Kladruby (Teplice District) =

- Municipality
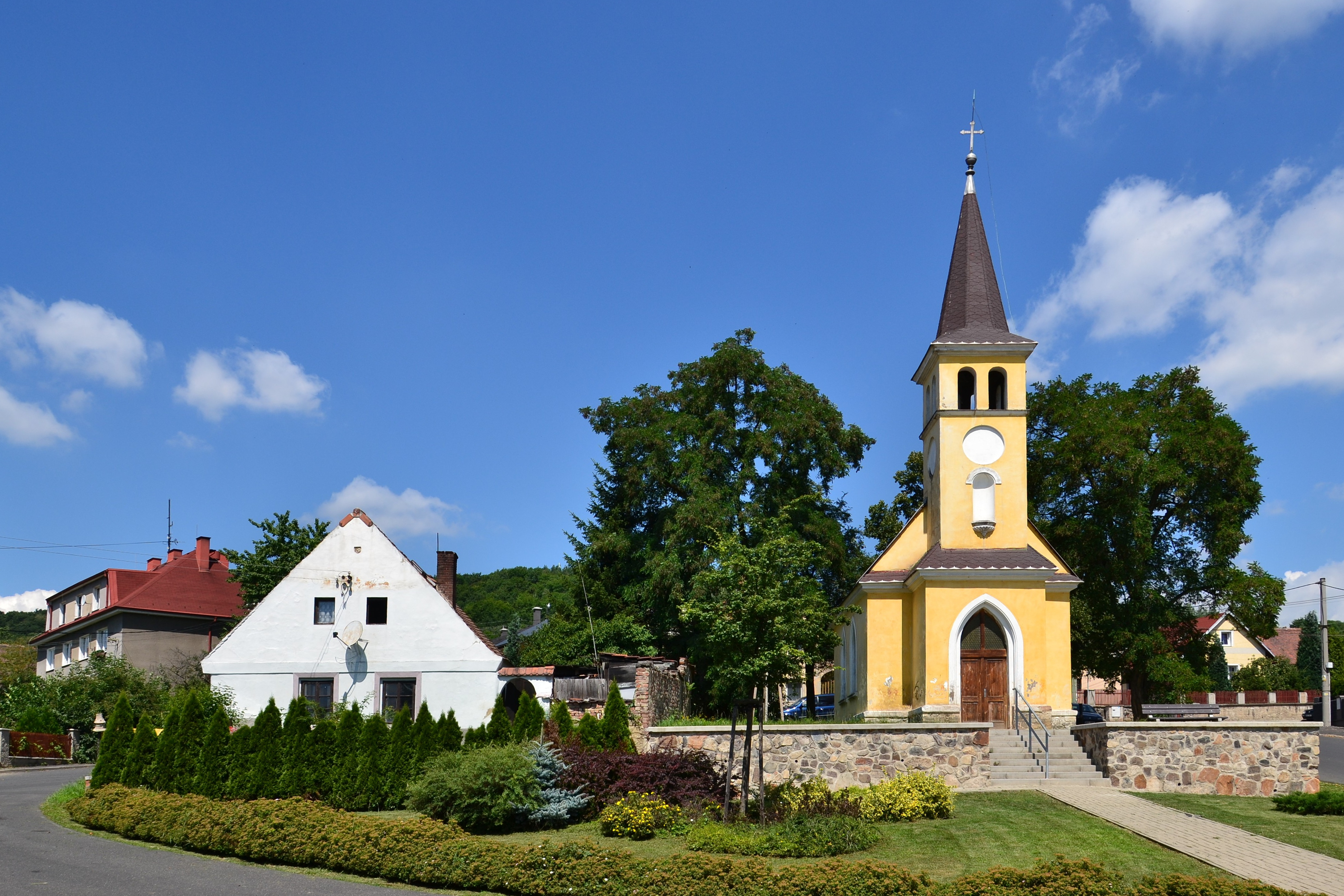
- Chapel of Saints Peter and Paul

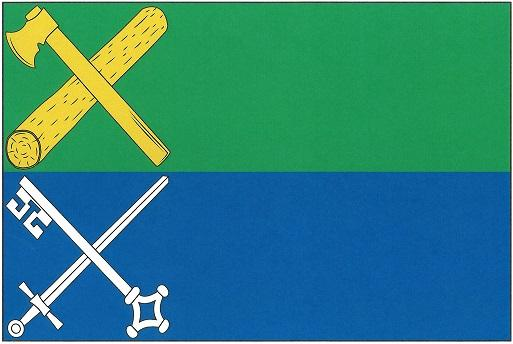
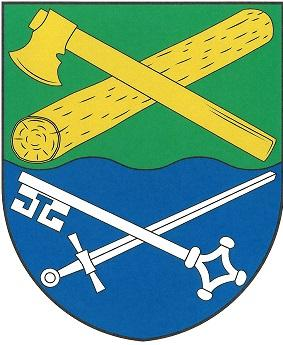
- Flag Coat of arms

- Location in the Czech Republic
- Coordinates: 50°36′54″N 13°49′32″E
- Country: Czech Republic
- Region: Ústí nad Labem
- District: Teplice
- First mentioned: 1370

Area
  - Total: 2.87 km^{2} (1.11 sq mi)
- Elevation: 285 m (935 ft)

Population (2026-01-01)
  - Total: 463
  - Density: 161/km^{2} (418/sq mi)
- Time zone: UTC+1 (CET)
  - Summer (DST): UTC+2 (CEST)
- Postal code: 415 01
- Website: www.kladrubyuteplic.cz

Kladruby (German: Kradrob) is a municipality and village in Teplice District in the Ústí nad Labem Region of the Czech Republic. It has about 500 inhabitants.

Kladruby lies approximately 3 kilometres (2 mi) south of Teplice, 16 km (10 mi) west of Ústí nad Labem, and 72 km (45 mi) north-west of Prague.

== Demographics ==
Historical population
Year	Pop.	±%
1869	277	—
1880	314	+13.4%
1890	372	+18.5%
1900	453	+21.8%
1910	557	+23.0%
1921	516	−7.4%
1930	576	+11.6%
1950	304	−47.2%
1961	317	+4.3%
1970	348	+9.8%
1980	343	−1.4%
1991	241	−29.7%
2001	248	+2.9%
2011	335	+35.1%
2021	430	+28.4%
Source: Censuses
