= Lukov (Teplice District) =

- Municipality
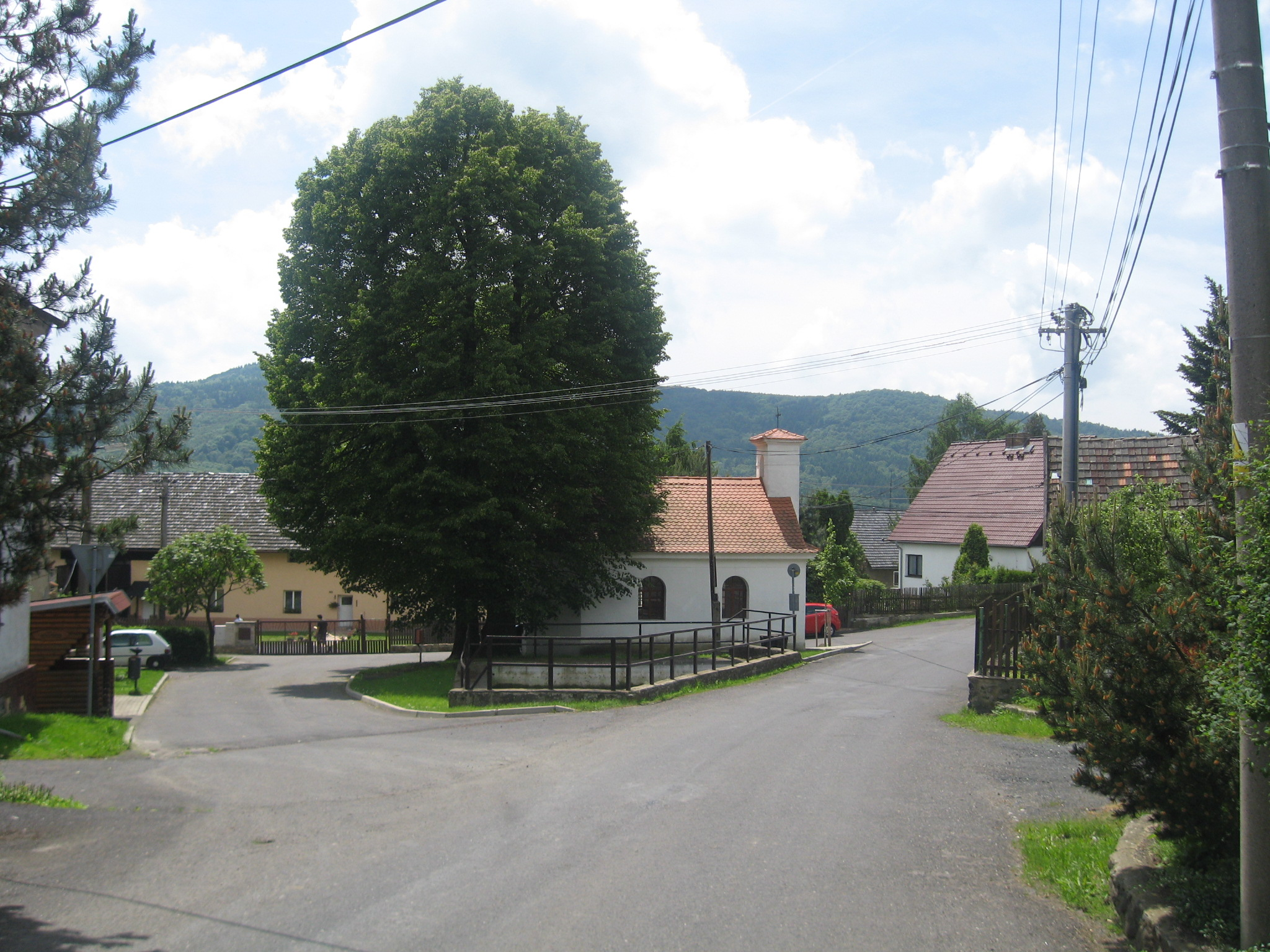
- Centre of Lukov with the Chapel of Saint Anthony of Padua

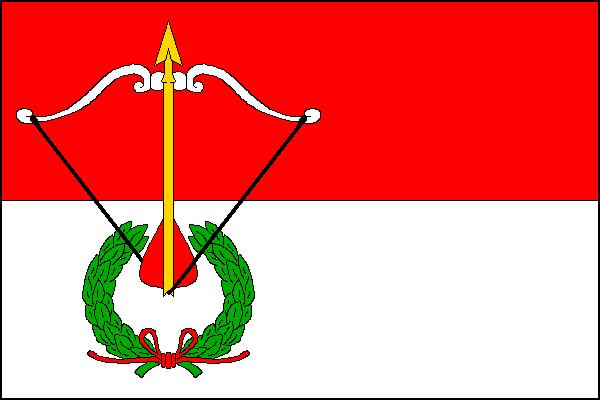
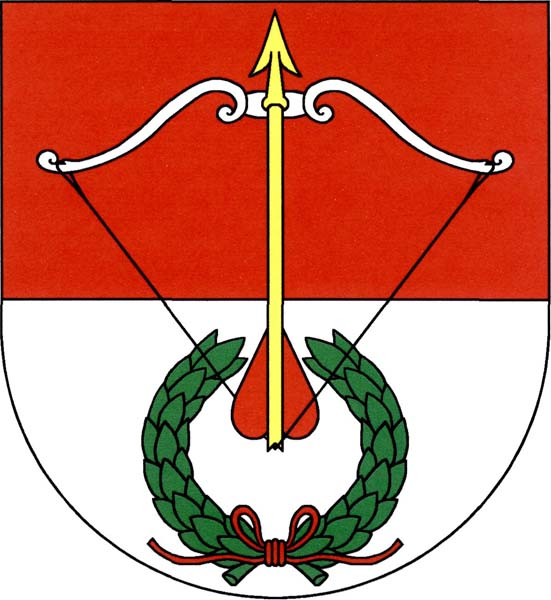
- Flag Coat of arms

- Location in the Czech Republic
- Coordinates: 50°31′42″N 13°53′8″E
- Country: Czech Republic
- Region: Ústí nad Labem
- District: Teplice
- First mentioned: 1378

Area
  - Total: 9.63 km^{2} (3.72 sq mi)
- Elevation: 504 m (1,654 ft)

Population (2026-01-01)
  - Total: 132
  - Density: 13.7/km^{2} (35.5/sq mi)
- Time zone: UTC+1 (CET)
  - Summer (DST): UTC+2 (CEST)
- Postal code: 418 04
- Website: www.obeclukov.cz

Lukov (German: Lukow) is a municipality and village in Teplice District in the Ústí nad Labem Region of the Czech Republic. It has about 100 inhabitants.

Lukov lies approximately 14 kilometres (9 mi) south of Teplice, 20 km (12 mi) south-west of Ústí nad Labem, and 62 km (39 mi) north-west of Prague.

== Administrative division ==
Lukov consists of two municipal parts (in brackets population according to the 2021 census):

- Lukov (68)
- Štěpánov (73)

== Demographics ==
Historical population
Year	Pop.	±%
1869	250	—
1880	259	+3.6%
1890	254	−1.9%
1900	273	+7.5%
1910	260	−4.8%
1921	261	+0.4%
1930	283	+8.4%
1950	142	−49.8%
1961	110	−22.5%
1970	110	+0.0%
1980	142	+29.1%
1991	123	−13.4%
2001	134	+8.9%
2011	132	−1.5%
2021	141	+6.8%
Source: Censuses
