= Újezdeček =

- Municipality
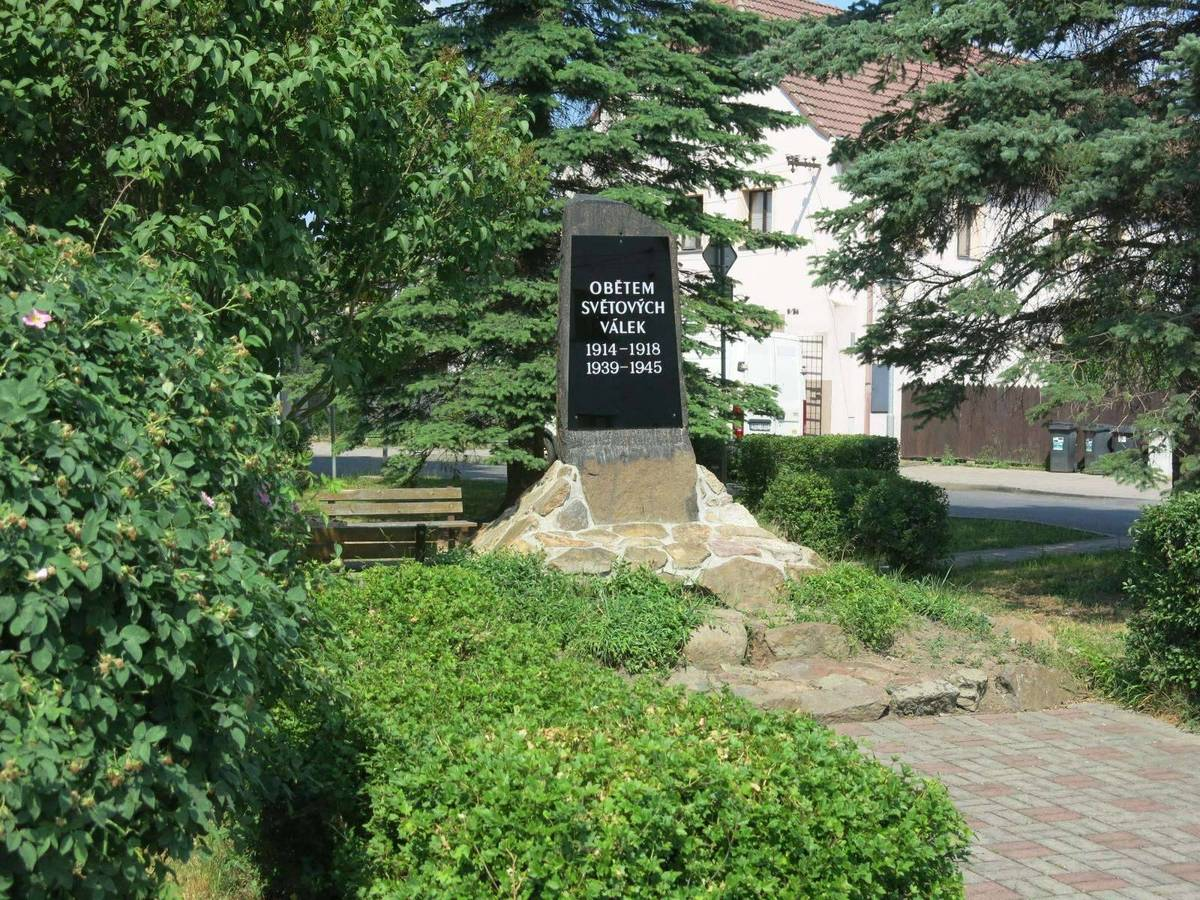
- Memorial to victims of World Wars

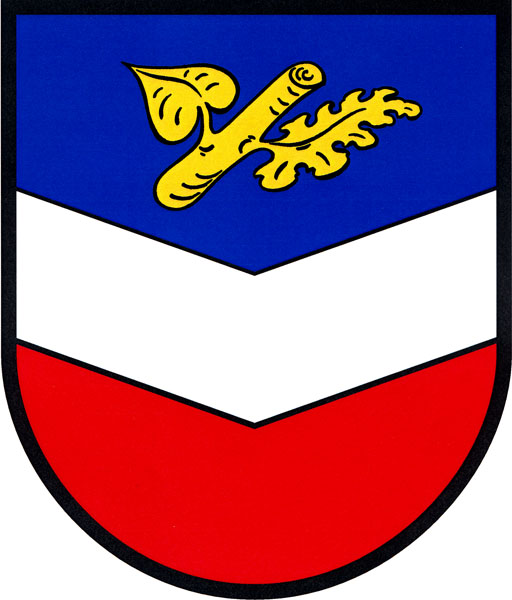
- Flag Coat of arms

- Location in the Czech Republic
- Coordinates: 50°38′45″N 13°47′23″E
- Country: Czech Republic
- Region: Ústí nad Labem
- District: Teplice
- First mentioned: 1398

Area
  - Total: 1.77 km^{2} (0.68 sq mi)
- Elevation: 243 m (797 ft)

Population (2026-01-01)
  - Total: 866
  - Density: 489/km^{2} (1,270/sq mi)
- Time zone: UTC+1 (CET)
  - Summer (DST): UTC+2 (CEST)
- Postal code: 415 01
- Website: www.ujezdecek.cz

Újezdeček (until 1948 Malý Újezd; German: Klein Augezd) is a municipality and village in Teplice District in the Ústí nad Labem Region of the Czech Republic. It has about 900 inhabitants.

Újezdeček lies approximately 3 kilometres (2 mi) north-west of Teplice, 18 km (11 mi) west of Ústí nad Labem, and 77 km (48 mi) north-west of Prague.

== Demographics ==
Historical population
Year	Pop.	±%
1869	450	—
1880	793	+76.2%
1890	1,085	+36.8%
1900	1,578	+45.4%
1910	2,078	+31.7%
1921	2,065	−0.6%
1930	2,188	+6.0%
1950	1,540	−29.6%
1961	1,053	−31.6%
1970	918	−12.8%
1980	984	+7.2%
1991	769	−21.8%
2001	779	+1.3%
2011	885	+13.6%
2021	831	−6.1%
Source: Censuses
