= Žim =

- Municipality
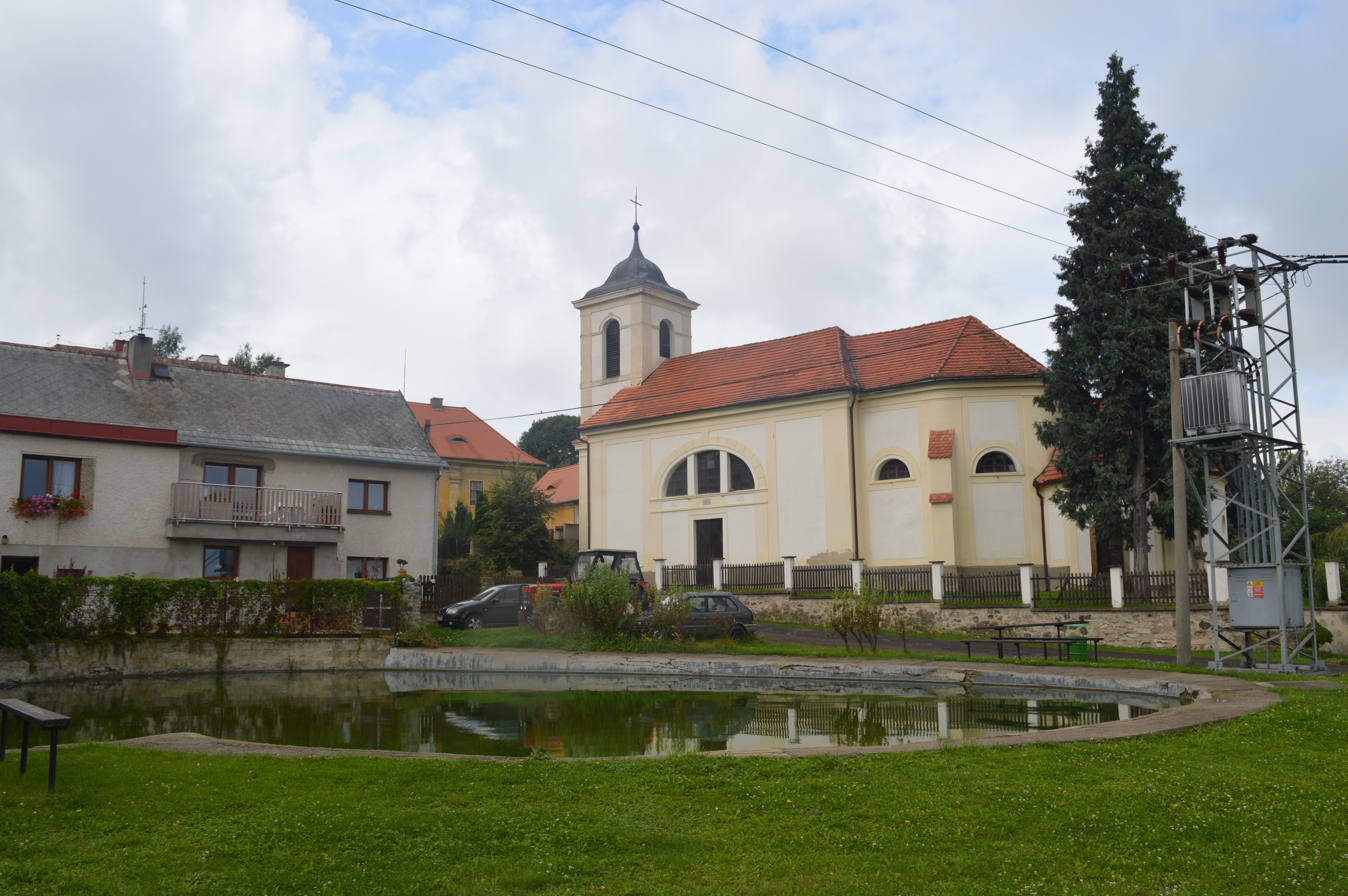
- Church of the Finding of the Holy Cross

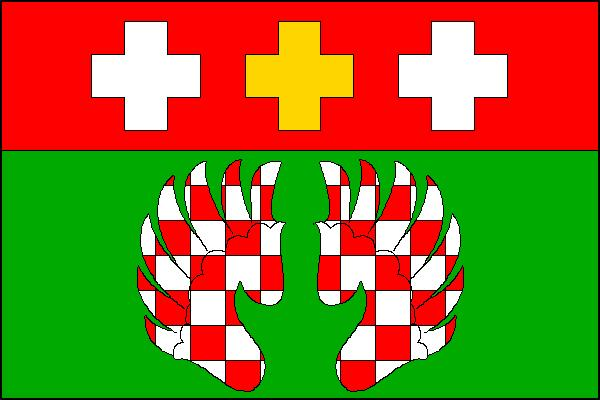
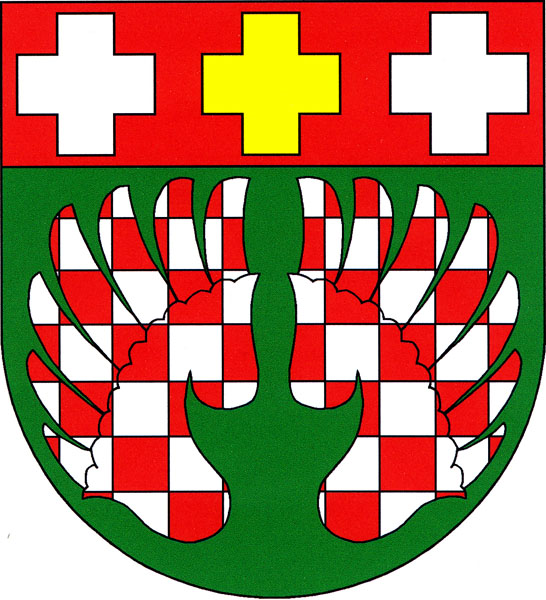
- Flag Coat of arms

- Location in the Czech Republic
- Coordinates: 50°35′6″N 13°57′55″E
- Country: Czech Republic
- Region: Ústí nad Labem
- District: Teplice
- First mentioned: 1352

Area
  - Total: 5.73 km^{2} (2.21 sq mi)
- Elevation: 322 m (1,056 ft)

Population (2026-01-01)
  - Total: 242
  - Density: 42.2/km^{2} (109/sq mi)
- Time zone: UTC+1 (CET)
  - Summer (DST): UTC+2 (CEST)
- Postal code: 417 63
- Website: www.zim.cz

Žim (German: Schima) is a municipality and village in Teplice District in the Ústí nad Labem Region of the Czech Republic. It has about 200 inhabitants.

Žim lies approximately 13 kilometres (8 mi) south-east of Teplice, 10 km (6 mi) south-west of Ústí nad Labem, and 64 km (40 mi) north-west of Prague.

== Administrative division ==
Žim consists of two municipal parts (in brackets population according to the 2021 census):

- Žim (192)
- Záhoří (23)

== Demographics ==
Historical population
Year	Pop.	±%
1869	298	—
1880	279	−6.4%
1890	248	−11.1%
1900	302	+21.8%
1910	324	+7.3%
1921	310	−4.3%
1930	320	+3.2%
1950	262	−18.1%
1961	230	−12.2%
1970	167	−27.4%
1980	162	−3.0%
1991	122	−24.7%
2001	132	+8.2%
2011	156	+18.2%
2021	215	+37.8%
Source: Censuses
