= Zabrušany =

- Municipality
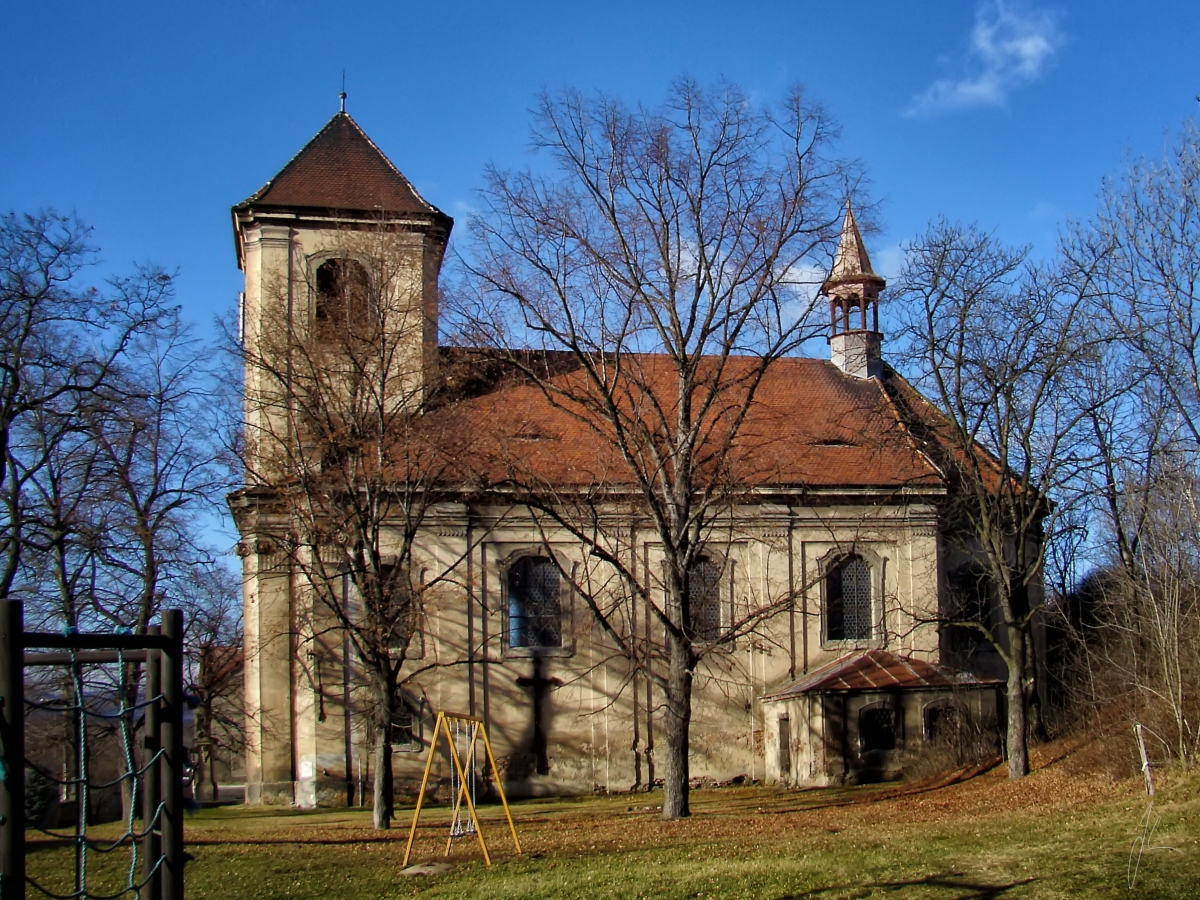
- Church of Saints Simon and Jude

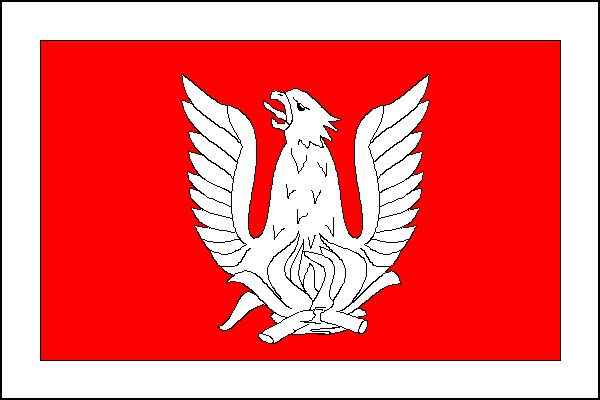
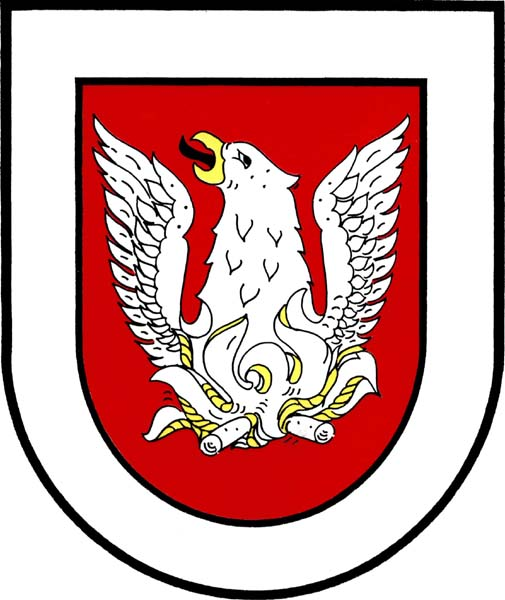
- Flag Coat of arms

- Location in the Czech Republic
- Coordinates: 50°36′18″N 13°47′15″E
- Country: Czech Republic
- Region: Ústí nad Labem
- District: Teplice
- First mentioned: 1207

Area
  - Total: 9.24 km^{2} (3.57 sq mi)
- Elevation: 218 m (715 ft)

Population (2026-01-01)
  - Total: 1,146
  - Density: 124/km^{2} (321/sq mi)
- Time zone: UTC+1 (CET)
  - Summer (DST): UTC+2 (CEST)
- Postal code: 417 71
- Website: www.zabrusany.cz

Zabrušany (German: Sobrusan) is a municipality and village in Teplice District in the Ústí nad Labem Region of the Czech Republic. It has about 1,100 inhabitants.

Zabrušany lies approximately 4 kilometres (2 mi) south-west of Teplice, 19 km (12 mi) west of Ústí nad Labem, and 74 km (46 mi) north-west of Prague.

== Administrative division ==
Zabrušany consists of five municipal parts (in brackets population according to the 2021 census):

- Zabrušany (321)
- Štěrbina (11)
- Straky (138)
- Všechlapy (280)
- Želénky (387)

== Demographics ==
Historical population
Year	Pop.	±%
1869	856	—
1880	1,184	+38.3%
1890	1,612	+36.1%
1900	2,603	+61.5%
1910	2,592	−0.4%
1921	2,700	+4.2%
1930	3,222	+19.3%
1950	1,850	−42.6%
1961	1,770	−4.3%
1970	1,478	−16.5%
1980	1,213	−17.9%
1991	1,071	−11.7%
2001	1,093	+2.1%
2011	1,071	−2.0%
2021	1,137	+6.2%
Source: Censuses
