= Měrunice =

- Municipality
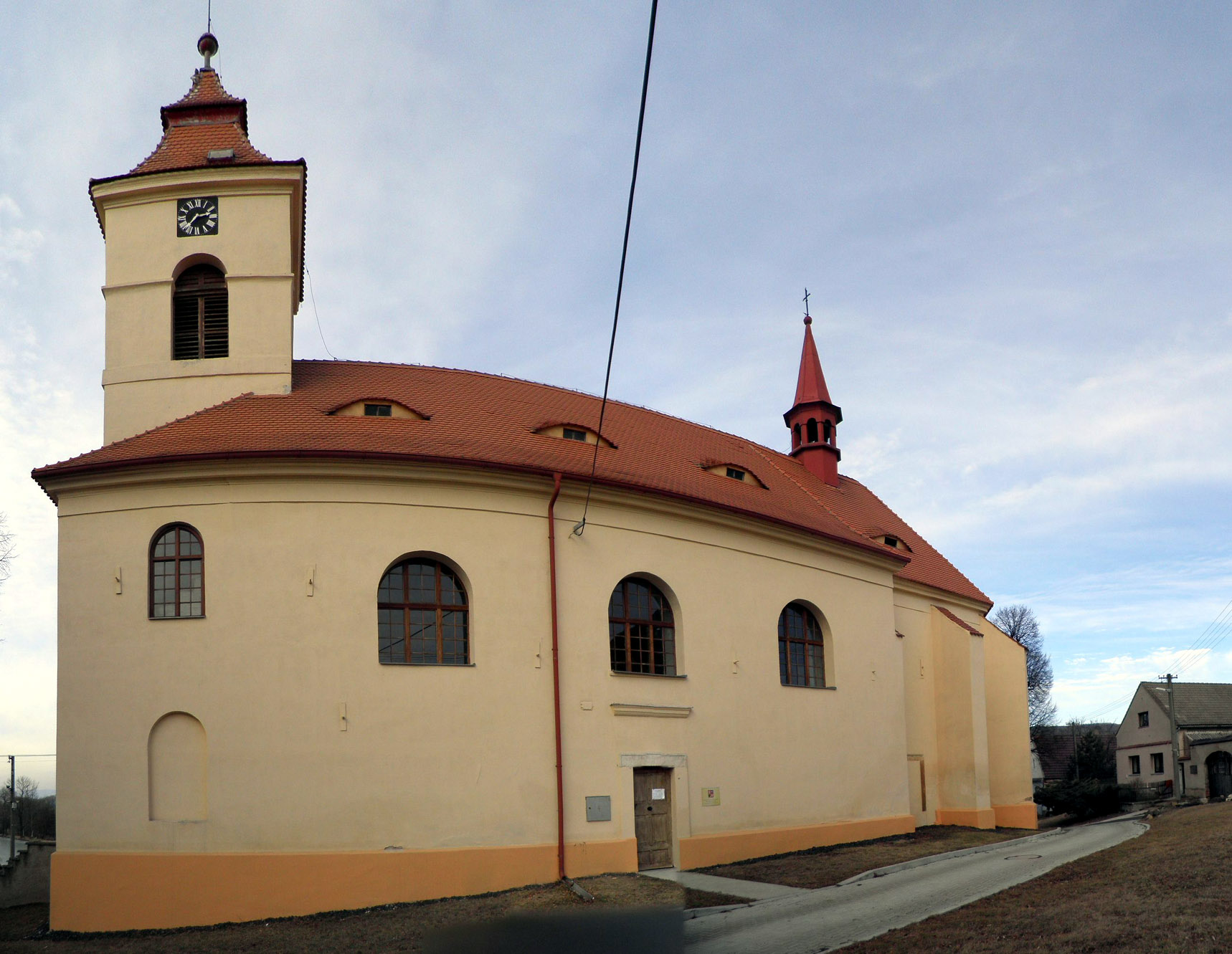
- Church of Saint Stanislaus

- Flag Coat of arms

- Location in the Czech Republic
- Coordinates: 50°28′50″N 13°49′5″E
- Country: Czech Republic
- Region: Ústí nad Labem
- District: Teplice
- First mentioned: 1295

Area
  - Total: 11.49 km^{2} (4.44 sq mi)
- Elevation: 425 m (1,394 ft)

Population (2026-01-01)
  - Total: 318
  - Density: 27.7/km^{2} (71.7/sq mi)
- Time zone: UTC+1 (CET)
  - Summer (DST): UTC+2 (CEST)
- Postal code: 418 04
- Website: www.merunice.cz

Měrunice (German: Meronitz) is a municipality and village in Teplice District in the Ústí nad Labem Region of the Czech Republic. It has about 300 inhabitants.

Měrunice lies approximately 18 kilometres (11 mi) south of Teplice, 26 km (16 mi) south-west of Ústí nad Labem, and 62 km (39 mi) north-west of Prague.

== Administrative division ==
Měrunice consists of two municipal parts (in brackets population according to the 2021 census):

- Měrunice (248)
- Žichov (53)

== Demographics ==
Historical population
| Year | Pop. | ±% |
|---|---|---|
| 1869 | 719 | — |
| 1880 | 676 | −6.0% |
| 1890 | 543 | −19.7% |
| 1900 | 554 | +2.0% |
| 1910 | 629 | +13.5% |
| 1921 | 604 | −4.0% |
| 1930 | 623 | +3.1% |
| 1950 | 393 | −36.9% |
| 1961 | 399 | +1.5% |
| 1970 | 297 | −25.6% |
| 1980 | 303 | +2.0% |
| 1991 | 259 | −14.5% |
| 2001 | 297 | +14.7% |
| 2011 | 311 | +4.7% |
| 2021 | 301 | −3.2% |
Source: Censuses
