= Teplice District =

Teplice District Okres Teplice
- District
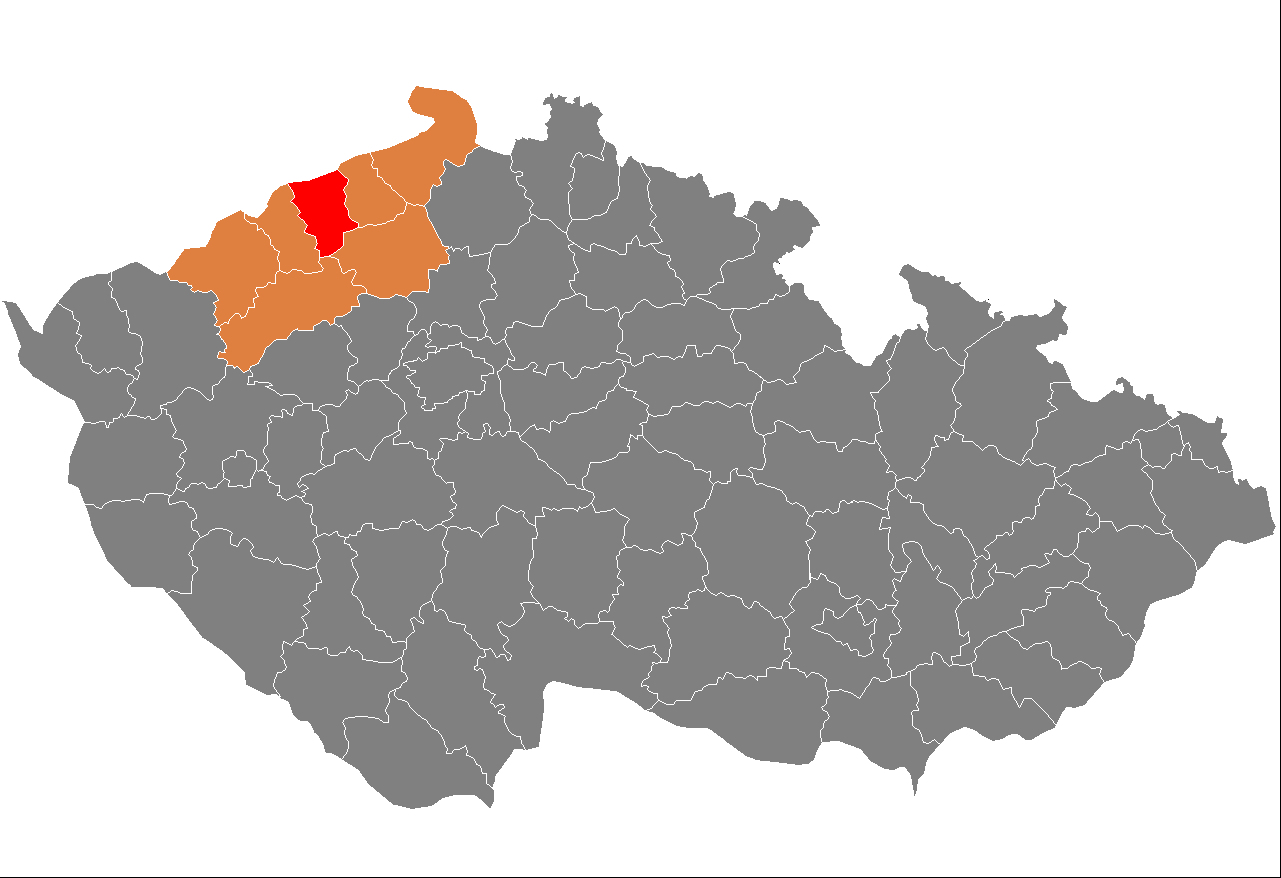
- Location in the Ústí nad Labem Region within the Czech Republic

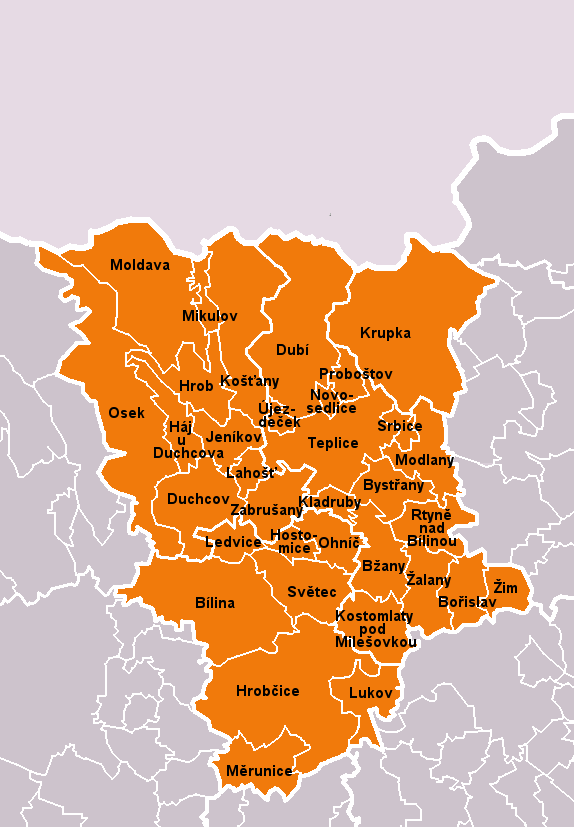
- Coordinates: 50°37′N 13°49′E
- Country: Czech Republic
- Region: Ústí nad Labem
- Capital: Teplice

Area
  - Total: 468.92 km^{2} (181.05 sq mi)

Population (2026)
  - Total: 127,658
  - Density: 272.24/km^{2} (705.09/sq mi)
- Time zone: UTC+1 (CET)
  - Summer (DST): UTC+2 (CEST)
- Municipalities: 34
- * Cities and towns: 9
- * Market towns: 1

Teplice District (Czech: okres Teplice) is a district in the Ústí nad Labem Region of the Czech Republic. Its capital is the city of Teplice.

== Administrative division ==
Teplice District is divided into two administrative districts of municipalities with extended competence: Teplice and Bílina.

=== List of municipalities ===
Cities and towns are marked in bold and market towns in italics:

Bílina - Bořislav - Bystřany - Bžany - Dubí - Duchcov - Háj u Duchcova - Hostomice - Hrob - Hrobčice - Jeníkov - Kladruby - Košťany - Kostomlaty pod Milešovkou - Krupka - Lahošť - Ledvice - Lukov - Měrunice - Mikulov - Modlany - Moldava - Novosedlice - Ohníč - Osek - Proboštov - Rtyně nad Bílinou - Srbice - Světec - Teplice - Újezdeček - Zabrušany - Žalany - Žim

== Geography ==
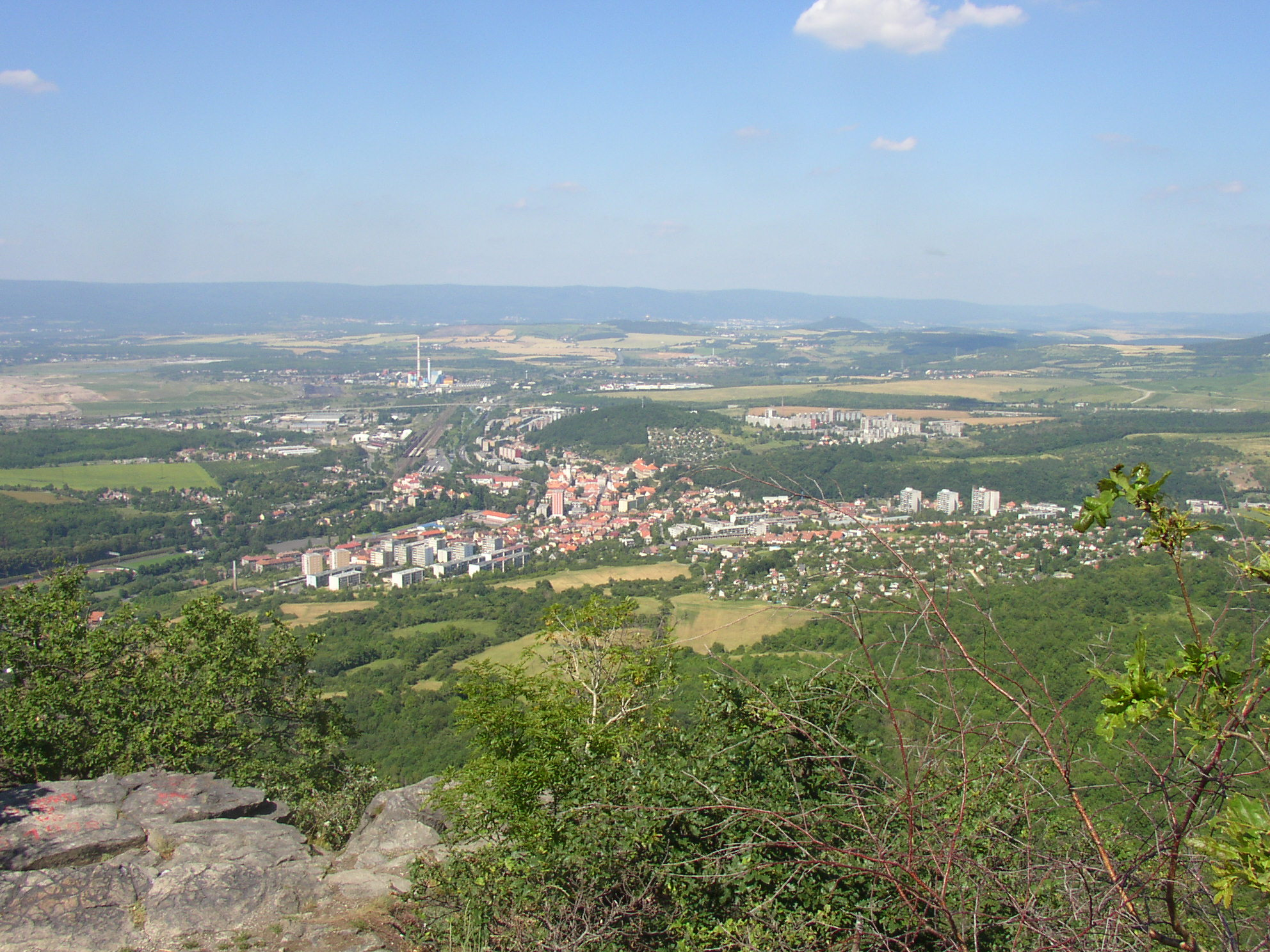
Landscape around Bílina

Teplice District borders Germany in the north. The terrain is very varied – hilly in the south, rather flat in the centre, and mountainous in the north. The territory extends into three geomorphological mesoregions: Central Bohemian Uplands (most of the territory), Most Basin (a strip across the territory from west to east) and Ore Mountains (north). The highest point of the district is the mountain Pramenáč in Košťany with an elevation of 910 m (2,990 ft), the lowest point is the river bed of the Bílina in Rtyně nad Bílinou at 160 m (520 ft).

From the total district area of 468.9 km^{2} (181.0 sq mi), agricultural land occupies 162.0 km^{2} (62.5 sq mi), forests occupy 184.4 km^{2} (71.2 sq mi), and water area occupies 8.5 km^{2} (3.3 sq mi). Forests cover 39.3% of the district's area.

The most important river is the Bílina, which flows across the territory from west to east. There are several reservoirs and artificial lakes created by flooding mines. The largest of them is Barbora with an area of 65 ha (160 acres).

České středohoří is a protected landscape area that extends into the district.

== Demographics ==
Historical population

Year	Pop.	±%
1869	63,774	—
1880	94,034	+47.4%
1890	120,998	+28.7%
1900	166,545	+37.6%
1910	187,358	+12.5%

Year	Pop.	±%
1921	186,585	−0.4%
1930	200,603	+7.5%
1950	129,583	−35.4%
1961	139,679	+7.8%
1970	135,644	−2.9%

Year	Pop.	±%
1980	135,838	+0.1%
1991	127,872	−5.9%
2001	126,098	−1.4%
2011	125,498	−0.5%
2021	122,730	−2.2%

Source: Censuses

=== Most populous municipalities ===
Name	Population	Area (km^{2})
Teplice	50,856	24
Bílina	14,401	33
Krupka	12,731	47
Duchcov	8,718	15
Dubí	8,148	34
Osek	4,506	42
Košťany	3,264	24
Proboštov	2,712	4
Novosedlice	2,094	1
Hrob	1,987	11

== Economy ==
The largest employers with headquarters in Teplice District and at least 500 employees are:

Economic entity	Location	Number of employees	Main activity
AGC Automotive Czech	Bílina	1,500–1,999	Shaping and processing of flat glass
AGC Flat Glass Czech	Teplice	1,000–1,499	Manufacture of flat glass
Severočeská servisní	Teplice	1,000–1,499	Construction and maintenance of pipelines
PRODECO	Bílina	500–999	Manufacture of machinery for mining and quarrying
Revitrans	Bílina	500–999	Rental and maintenance of construction and mining machinery
Správa a údržba silnic Ústeckého kraje	Dubí	500–999	Road management and maintenance
Auto-Kabel Krupka	Krupka	500–999	Manufacture of electricity distribution for automotive industry
Personna International CZ	Krupka	500–999	Manufacture of razors
Severočeské vodovody a kanalizace	Teplice	500–999	Water collection, treatment and supply

== Transport ==
There are no motorways in the district territory. The most important road that passes through the district is the I/13 from Karlovy Vary to Liberec.

== Sights ==
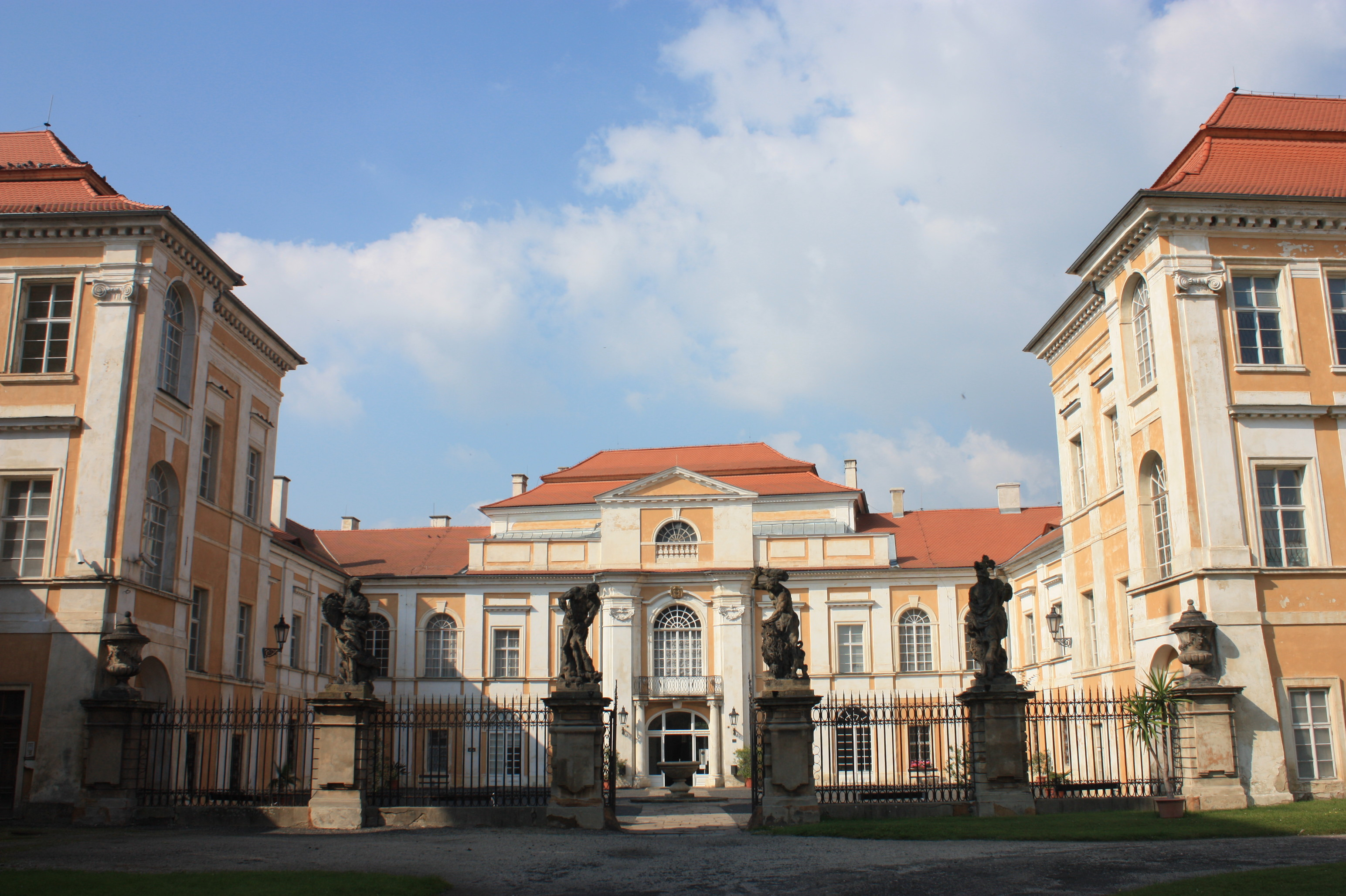
Duchcov Castle

The mining cultural landscape of Krupka was designated a UNESCO World Heritage Site in 2019 as part of the transnational Ore Mountain Mining Region.

The most important monuments in the district, protected as national cultural monuments, are:

- Memorial to the victims of the Nelson Mine disaster in Osek
- Osek Monastery
- Duchcov Castle
- Basilica of Our Lady of Sorrows in Krupka-Bohosudov

The best-preserved settlements, localities and landscapes, protected as monument reservations and monument zones, are:

- Bílina-Pražské Předměstí (archaeological monument reservation)
- Bílina
- Duchcov
- Krupka
- Teplice
- Mining cultural landscape of Krupka

The most visited tourist destination is the Regional Museum in Teplice.
