= Hrob =

- Town
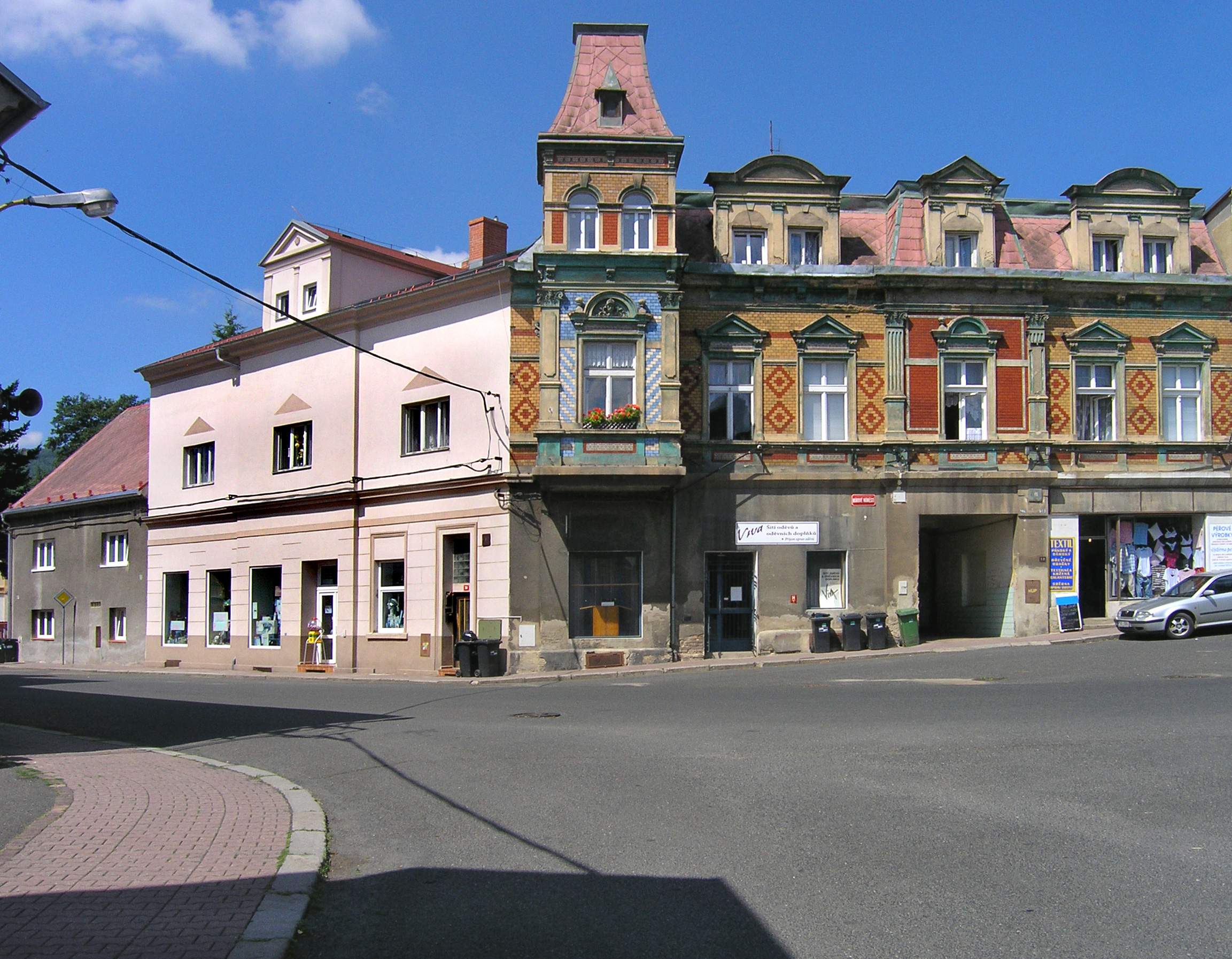
- The square Mírové náměstí

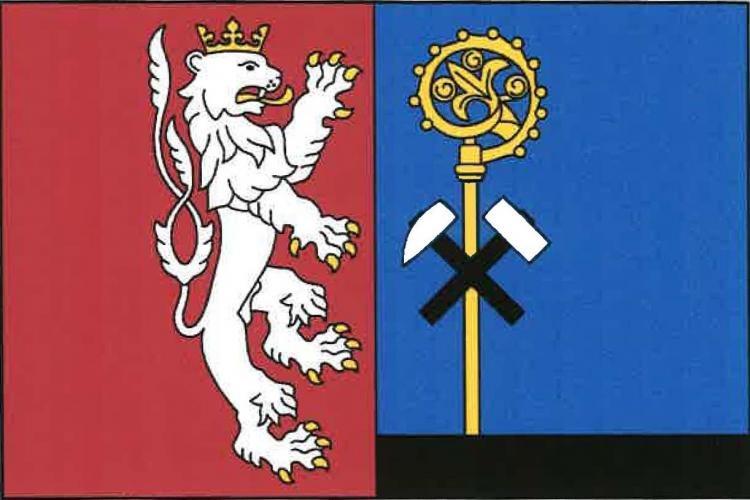
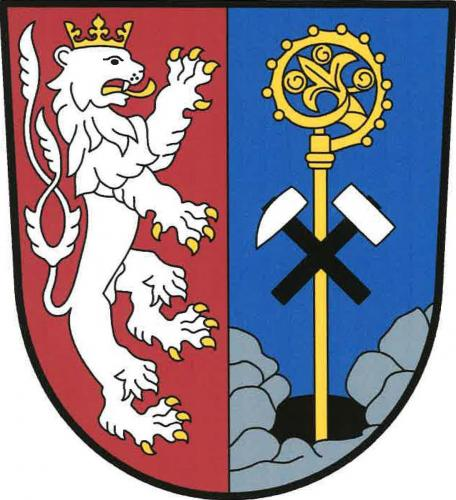
- Flag Coat of arms

- Location in the Czech Republic
- Coordinates: 50°39′32″N 13°43′28″E
- Country: Czech Republic
- Region: Ústí nad Labem
- District: Teplice
- First mentioned: 1282

Government
  - Mayor: Jiří Fürst

Area
  - Total: 11.11 km^{2} (4.29 sq mi)
- Elevation: 356 m (1,168 ft)

Population (2026-01-01)
  - Total: 1,987
  - Density: 178.8/km^{2} (463.2/sq mi)
- Time zone: UTC+1 (CET)
  - Summer (DST): UTC+2 (CEST)
- Postal code: 417 04
- Website: www.mestohrob.cz

Hrob (Czech pronunciation: [ˈɦrop]; German: Klostergrab) is a town in Teplice District in the Ústí nad Labem Region of the Czech Republic. It has about 2,000 inhabitants. The town is located on the Bouřlivec Stream, on the border between the Most Basin and Ore Mountains.

== Administrative division ==
Hrob consists of four municipal parts (in brackets population according to the 2021 census):

- Hrob (1,331)
- Křižanov (140)
- Mlýny (127)
- Verneřice (355)

== Etymology ==
The word hrob means 'grave' in modern Czech, but this is just a coincidence. The original German name of the settlement was Grap, later modified to Grab and transcribed into Czech as Hrob. The word grap was probably a term for a prospector's trench for search of silver ores.

== Geography ==
Hrob is located about 7 kilometres (4 mi) west of Teplice and 21 km (13 mi) west of Ústí nad Labem. The southern part of the municipal territory with the built-up area lies in the Most Basin and the northern part lies in the Ore Mountains. The highest point is at 855 m (2,805 ft) above sea level. The Bouřlivec Stream flows through the town. Artificial lakes Otakar and Barbora are located south of the town.

== History ==
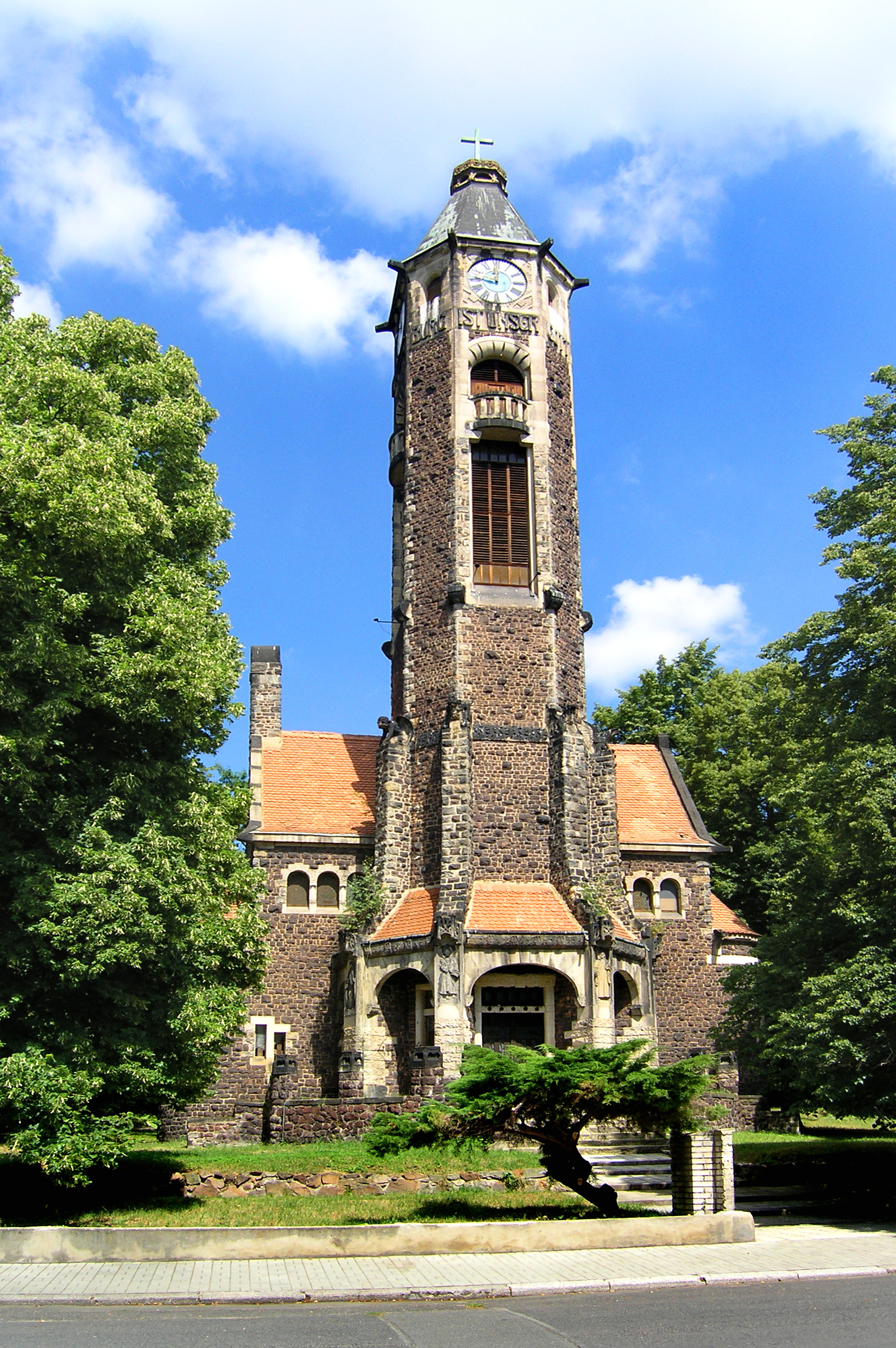
Evangelical church

The first written mention of Hrob is from 1282, when the convent in Teplice sold the village to the monastery in Osek. In 1594, the settlement was promoted to a royal mining town by Emperor Rudolf II.

== Demographics ==
Historical population

Year	Pop.	±%
1869	2,448	—
1880	3,032	+23.9%
1890	4,212	+38.9%
1900	5,928	+40.7%
1910	6,264	+5.7%

Year	Pop.	±%
1921	5,825	−7.0%
1930	5,905	+1.4%
1950	3,475	−41.2%
1961	3,059	−12.0%
1970	2,648	−13.4%

Year	Pop.	±%
1980	2,396	−9.5%
1991	2,063	−13.9%
2001	1,989	−3.6%
2011	1,959	−1.5%
2021	1,953	−0.3%

Source: Censuses

== Transport ==
Hrob is located on the railway lines from Ústí nad Labem and from Most to Moldava, but they are only in operation on weekends.

== Sights ==
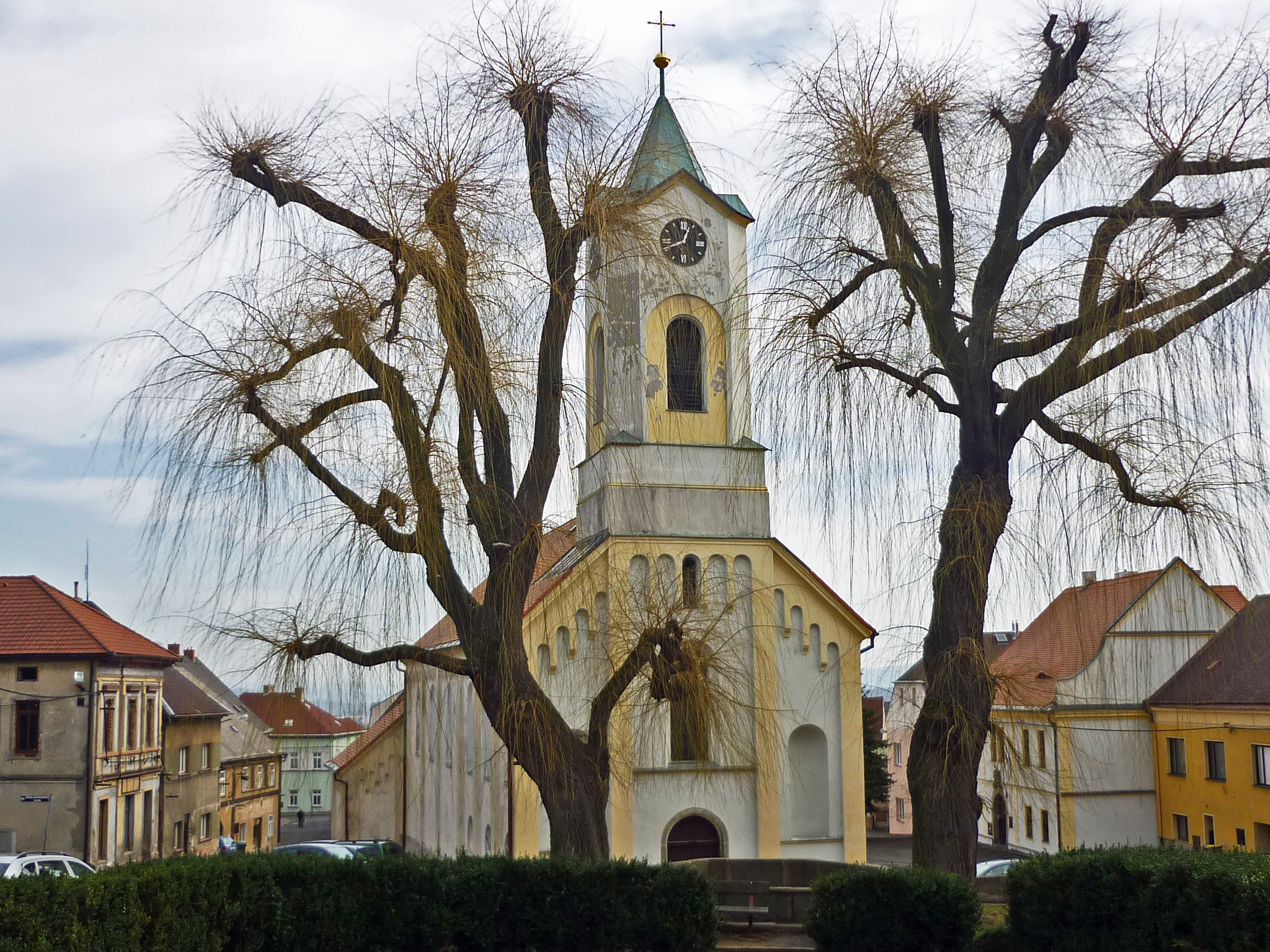
Church of Saint Barbara

The most notable building is the Church of Saint Barbara. The original Gothic church was founded in 1228, but was damaged during the Hussite Wars and destroyed during the Thirty Years' Wars. It was then renewed in 1637 and rebuilt into its current pseudo-Gothic form in the 19th century.

The Evangelic church was built in a style influenced by Jugendstil in 1900–1902. It was designed by the Schilling & Graebner firm. It has a massive tower decorated with Art Nouveau elements.
