= Gustav Münzberger =

German SS officer (1903–1977)

- Gustav Münzberger, assistant to deputy commandant at Treblinka II (a free man, postwar photo)
- Born: 17 August 1903; Weißkirchlitz
- Died: 23 March 1977 (aged 73)
- Military career
- Allegiance: Nazi Germany
- Branch: Schutzstaffel
- Rank: Unterscharführer, SS
- Unit: SS-Totenkopfverbände
- Commands: Treblinka extermination camp

SS-Unterscharführer Gustav Münzberger (17 August 1903 – 23 March 1977), born in Weißkirchlitz (Sudetenland), was a carpenter and factory worker before his involvement in the Holocaust. Following the Nazi German invasion of Poland at the onset of World War II he was posted as a serviceman in August 1940 at the Sonnenstein Euthanasia Centre at Schloss Sonnenstein in Pirna. He arrived at the Treblinka extermination camp in late September 1942 and became assistant to deputy commandant SS-Oberscharführer Heinrich Matthes, in charge of leading Jews into the gas chambers and gassing them.

Treblinka was built as part of the most deadly phase of the Final Solution, known as Operation Reinhard. The camp operated between 23 July 1942 and 19 October 1943. During this time, more than 800,000 people – men, women, and children – were murdered there, with other estimates exceeding 1,000,000 victims.

Münzberger was an operator of the gas chambers at the Totenlager, and later Chief of the Leichentransportkommando corpse transport team. On 21 June 1943 he was promoted from the rank of SS-Rottenführer to the rank of SS-Unterscharführer. During the Treblinka revolt he was on holiday at home. After the closure of Treblinka, he was sent to Trieste in Italy at the end of November or early December 1943. The Risiera di San Sabba killing centre was being set up there. Münzberger was arrested twenty years later in West Germany on 13 July 1963.

He was charged with war crimes at the Treblinka trials lasting from 12 October 1964 till 24 August 1965, and sentenced to 12 years imprisonment. He served six years and was released on good behavior in 1971. He died six years later.

== See also ==
- Karl Pötzinger, head of the cremation kommando in the Totenlager
- Max Möller (SS officer), ordinance at Camp 2 Auffanglager in Treblinka

== Sources ==
- Rückerl, Adalbert, ed. (1977). NS-Vernichtungslager im Spiegel deutscher Strafprozesse (Nazi Extermination Camps mirrored by German Criminal Trials). Munich. pp. 81–.
