= Hrobčice =

- Municipality
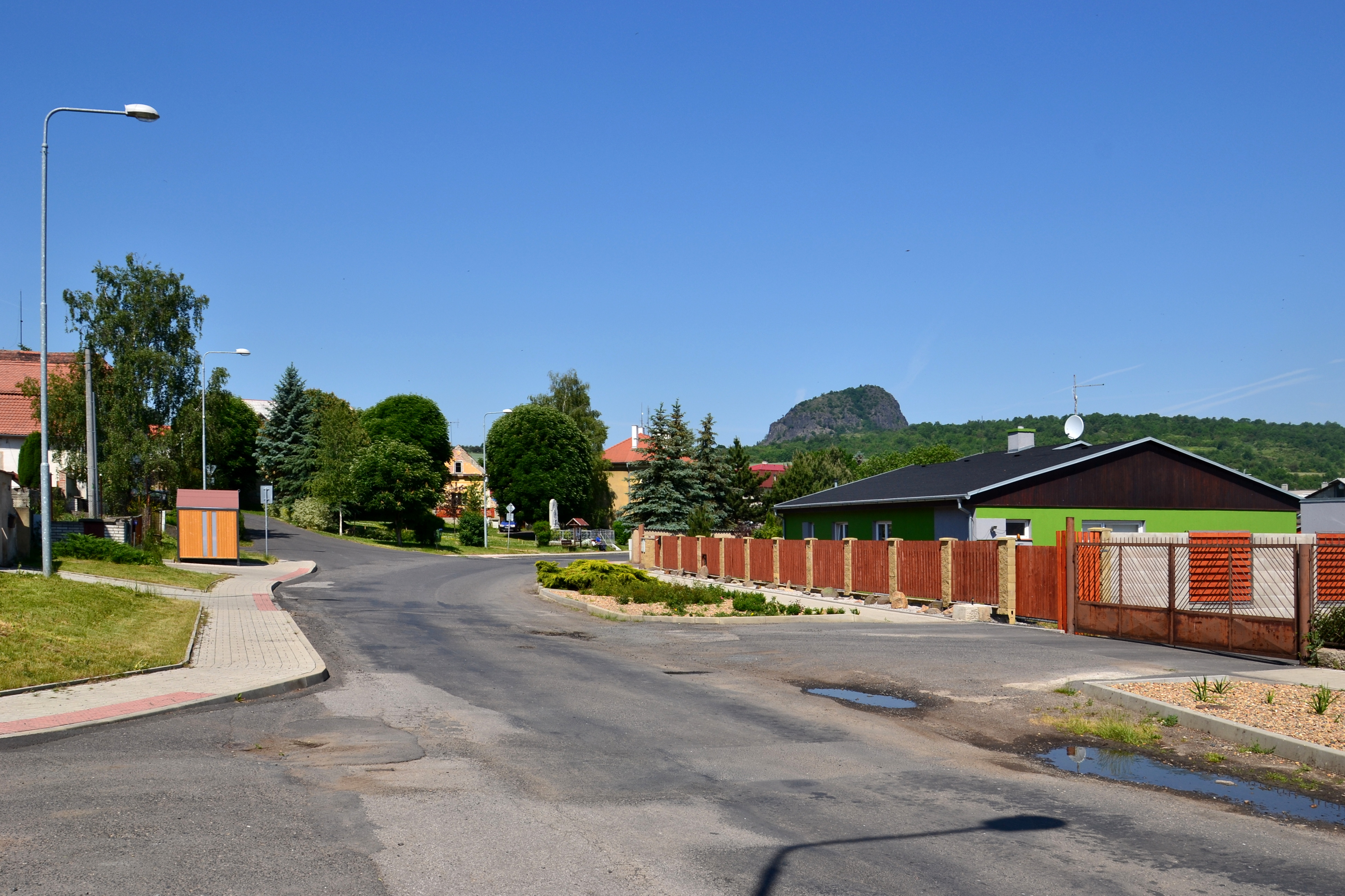
- Common in Hrobčice

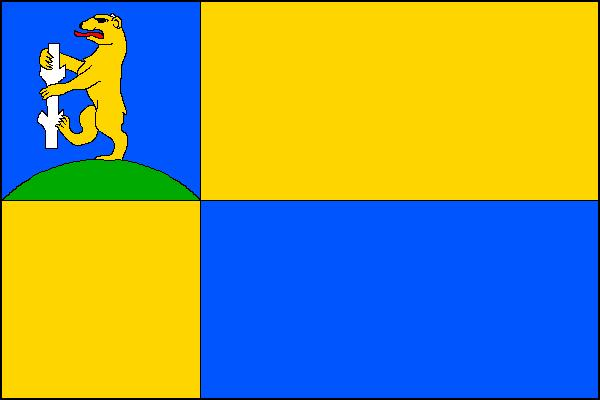
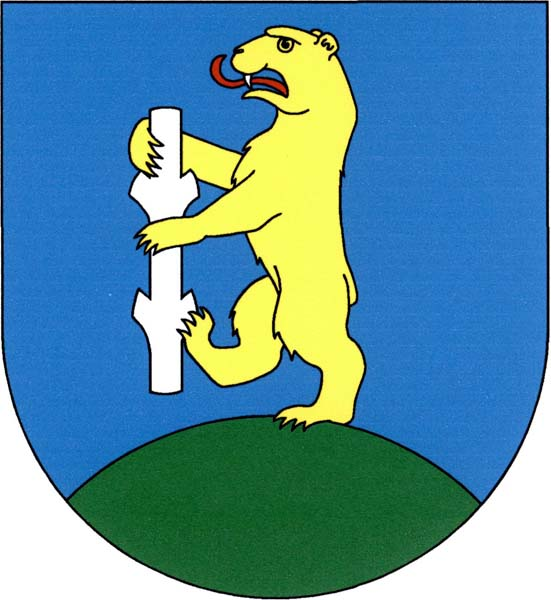
- Flag Coat of arms

- Location in the Czech Republic
- Coordinates: 50°40′4″N 13°50′10″E
- Country: Czech Republic
- Region: Ústí nad Labem
- District: Teplice
- First mentioned: 1240

Area
  - Total: 42.58 km^{2} (16.44 sq mi)
- Elevation: 291 m (955 ft)

Population (2026-01-01)
  - Total: 1,102
  - Density: 25.88/km^{2} (67.03/sq mi)
- Time zone: UTC+1 (CET)
  - Summer (DST): UTC+2 (CEST)
- Postal codes: 417 57, 418 04
- Website: www.hrobcice.cz

Hrobčice (German: Hrobschitz) is a municipality and village in Teplice District in the Ústí nad Labem Region of the Czech Republic. It has about 1,100 inhabitants.

Hrobčice lies approximately 13 kilometres (8 mi) south of Teplice, 24 km (15 mi) south-west of Ústí nad Labem, and 66 km (41 mi) north-west of Prague.

== Administrative division ==
Hrobčice consists of nine municipal parts (in brackets population according to the 2021 census):

- Hrobčice (363)
- Červený Újezd (78)
- Chouč (64)
- Kučlín (39)
- Mirošovice (118)
- Mrzlice (55)
- Mukov (94)
- Razice (184)
- Tvrdín (36)

== Demographics ==
Historical population
Year	Pop.	±%
1869	2,571	—
1880	2,665	+3.7%
1890	2,676	+0.4%
1900	2,800	+4.6%
1910	3,050	+8.9%
1921	3,080	+1.0%
1930	3,364	+9.2%
1950	2,077	−38.3%
1961	2,072	−0.2%
1970	1,490	−28.1%
1980	1,018	−31.7%
1991	859	−15.6%
2001	838	−2.4%
2011	949	+13.2%
2021	1,031	+8.6%
Source: Censuses
