= Lahošť =

- Municipality
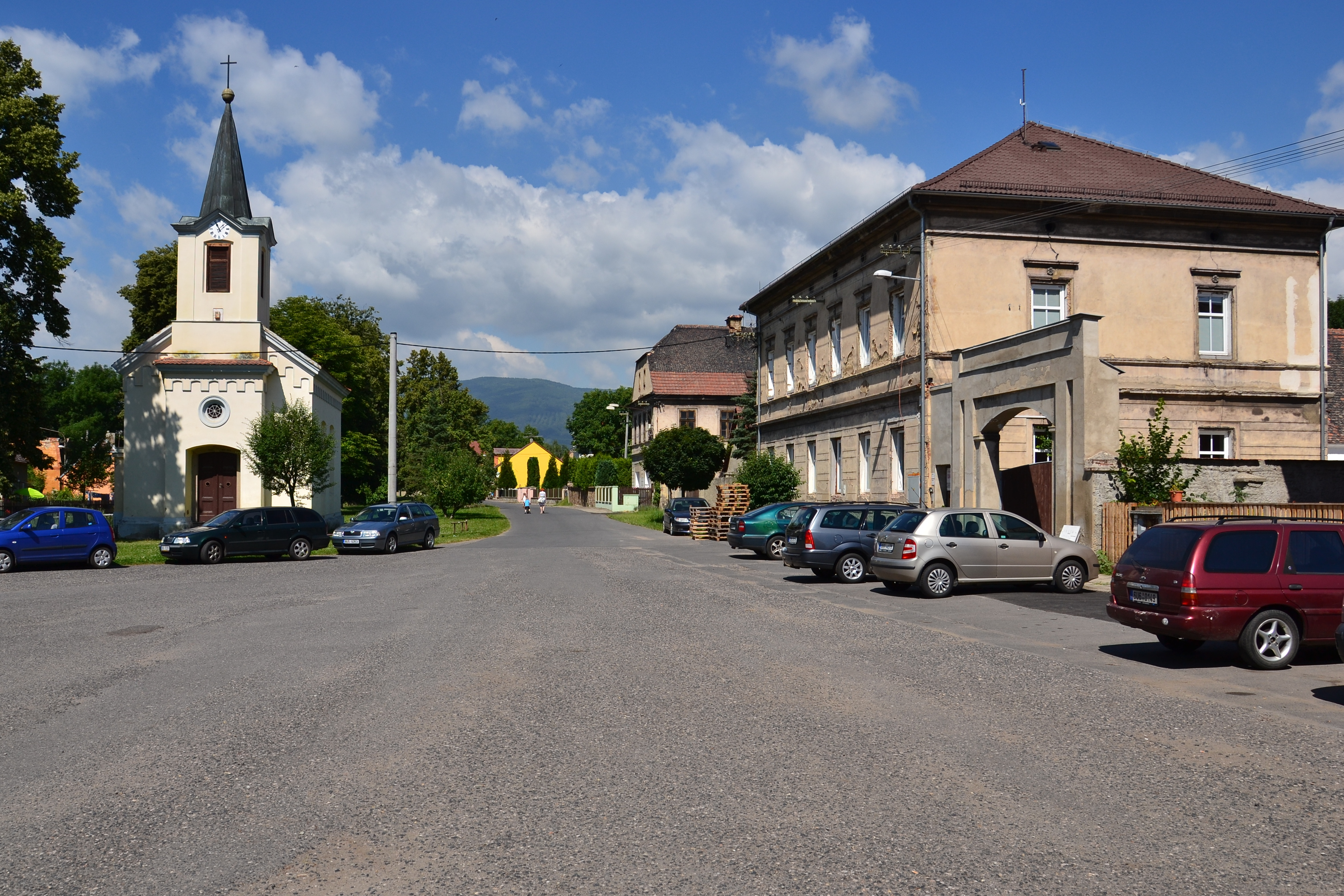
- Centre of Lahošť

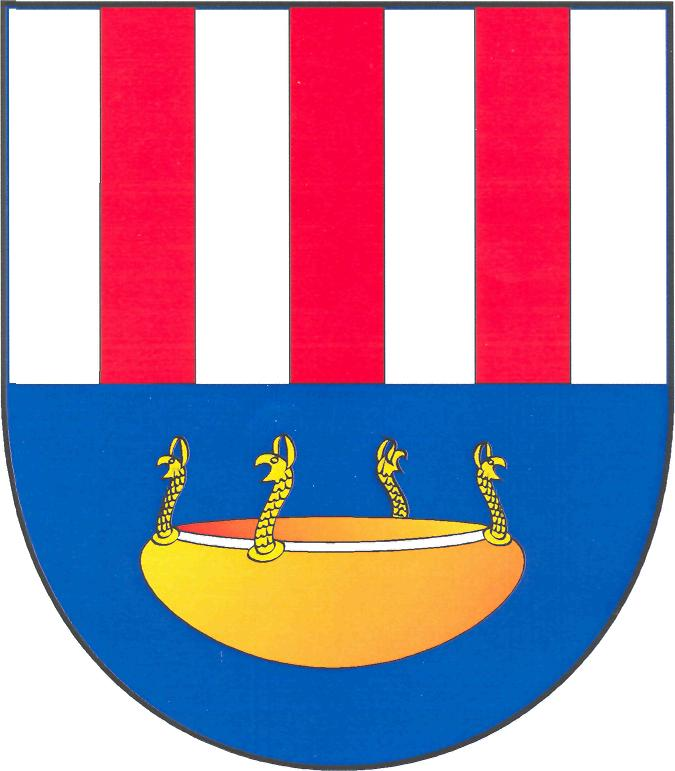
- Flag Coat of arms

- Location in the Czech Republic
- Coordinates: 50°37′6″N 13°45′55″E
- Country: Czech Republic
- Region: Ústí nad Labem
- District: Teplice
- First mentioned: 1360

Area
  - Total: 3.03 km^{2} (1.17 sq mi)
- Elevation: 213 m (699 ft)

Population (2026-01-01)
  - Total: 684
  - Density: 226/km^{2} (585/sq mi)
- Time zone: UTC+1 (CET)
  - Summer (DST): UTC+2 (CEST)
- Postal code: 417 25
- Website: www.lahost.cz

Lahošť (until 2006 Lahošt; German: Loosch) is a municipality and village in Teplice District in the Ústí nad Labem Region of the Czech Republic. It has about 700 inhabitants.

Lahošť lies approximately 4 kilometres (2 mi) west of Teplice, 20 km (12 mi) west of Ústí nad Labem, and 76 km (47 mi) north-west of Prague.

== Demographics ==
Historical population
Year	Pop.	±%
1869	375	—
1880	556	+48.3%
1890	754	+35.6%
1900	968	+28.4%
1910	938	−3.1%
1921	843	−10.1%
1930	936	+11.0%
1950	577	−38.4%
1961	623	+8.0%
1970	617	−1.0%
1980	552	−10.5%
1991	530	−4.0%
2001	538	+1.5%
2011	561	+4.3%
2021	689	+22.8%
Source: Censuses
