= Háj u Duchcova =

- Municipality
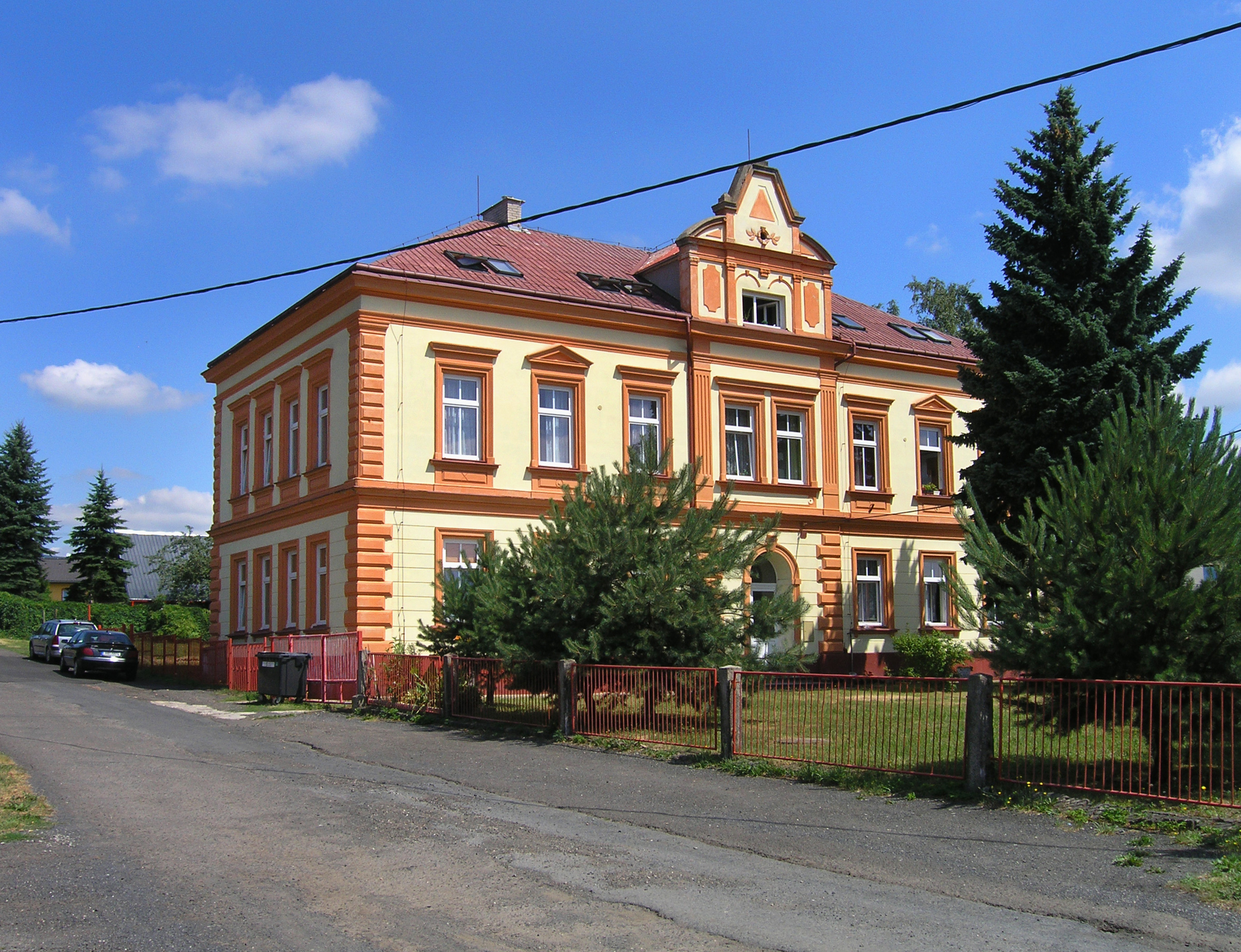
- Former school

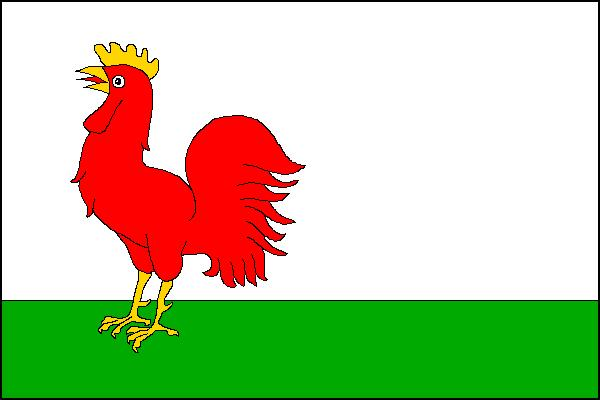
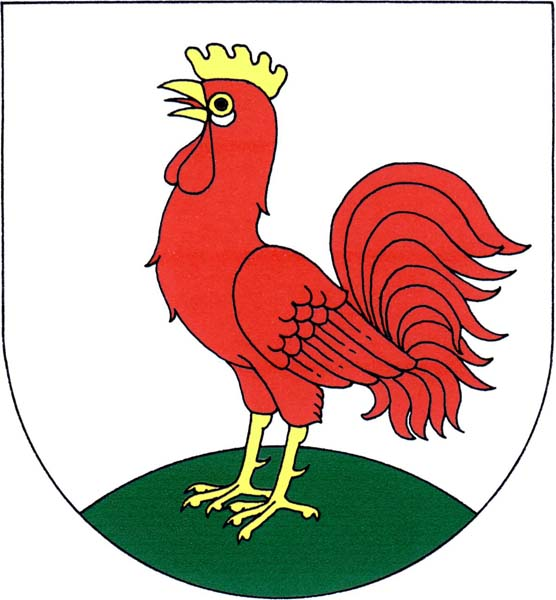
- Flag Coat of arms

- Location in the Czech Republic
- Coordinates: 50°37′51″N 13°42′46″E
- Country: Czech Republic
- Region: Ústí nad Labem
- District: Teplice
- First mentioned: 1203

Area
  - Total: 7.51 km^{2} (2.90 sq mi)
- Elevation: 281 m (922 ft)

Population (2026-01-01)
  - Total: 1,371
  - Density: 183/km^{2} (473/sq mi)
- Time zone: UTC+1 (CET)
  - Summer (DST): UTC+2 (CEST)
- Postal code: 417 22
- Website: www.ouhaj.cz

Háj u Duchcova (German: Haan) is a municipality and village in Teplice District in the Ústí nad Labem Region of the Czech Republic. It has about 1,400 inhabitants.

Háj u Duchcova lies approximately 8 kilometres (5 mi) west of Teplice, 24 km (15 mi) west of Ústí nad Labem, and 79 km (49 mi) north-west of Prague.

== Administrative division ==
Háj u Duchcova consists of two municipal parts (in brackets population according to the 2021 census):

- Háj u Duchcova (1,140)
- Domaslavice (181)

== Demographics ==
Historical population
Year	Pop.	±%
1869	1,036	—
1880	1,408	+35.9%
1890	1,924	+36.6%
1900	2,698	+40.2%
1910	3,031	+12.3%
1921	2,849	−6.0%
1930	2,589	−9.1%
1950	1,476	−43.0%
1961	1,509	+2.2%
1970	1,100	−27.1%
1980	1,050	−4.5%
1991	906	−13.7%
2001	952	+5.1%
2011	1,033	+8.5%
2021	1,321	+27.9%
Source: Censuses
