= Bystřany =

- Municipality
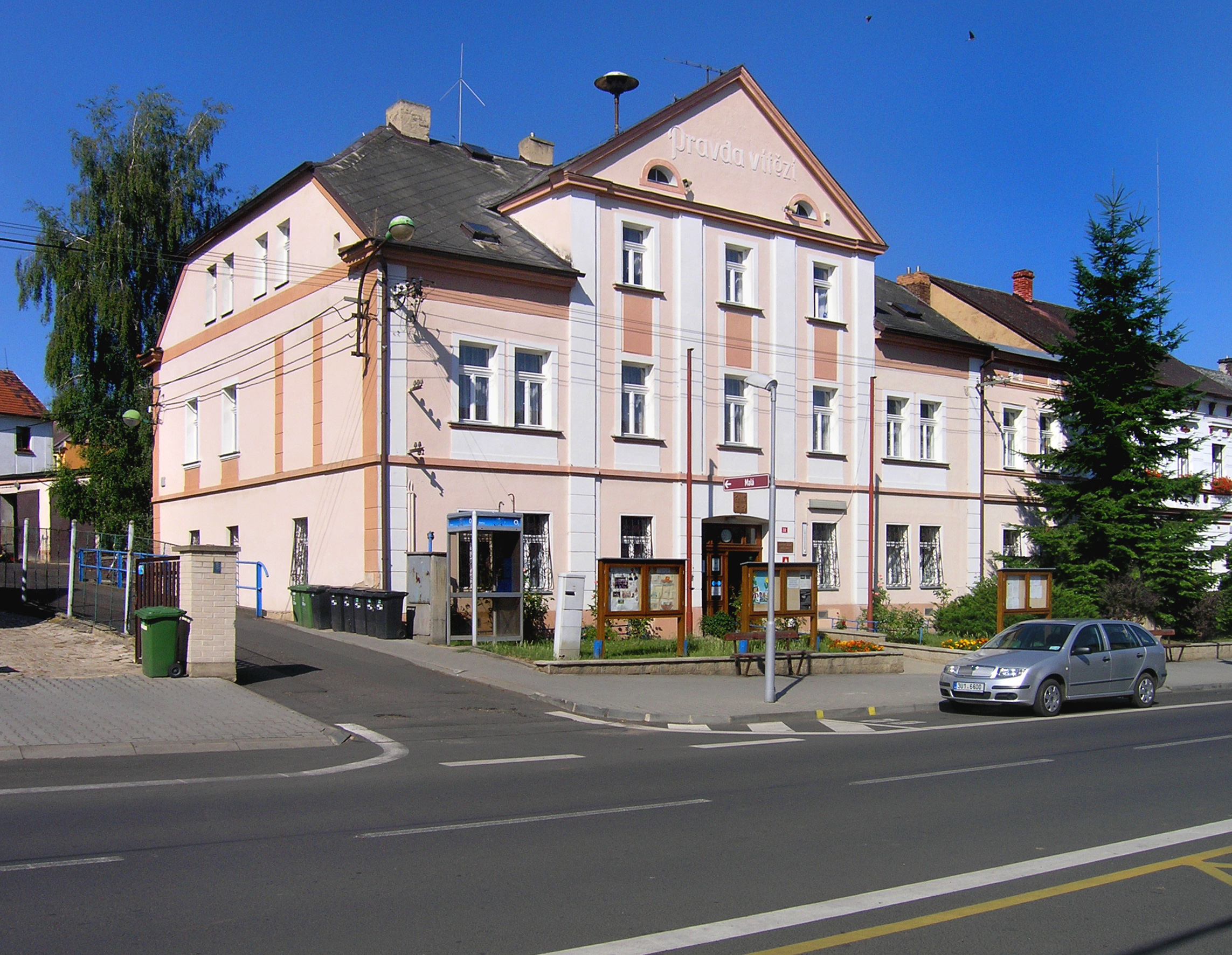
- Municipal office

- Flag Coat of arms

- Location in the Czech Republic
- Coordinates: 50°37′39″N 13°51′49″E
- Country: Czech Republic
- Region: Ústí nad Labem
- District: Teplice
- First mentioned: 1509

Area
  - Total: 8.52 km^{2} (3.29 sq mi)
- Elevation: 205 m (673 ft)

Population (2026-01-01)
  - Total: 1,946
  - Density: 228/km^{2} (592/sq mi)
- Time zone: UTC+1 (CET)
  - Summer (DST): UTC+2 (CEST)
- Postal code: 417 61
- Website: www.bystrany.eu

Bystřany (German: Wisterschan) is a municipality and village in Teplice District in the Ústí nad Labem Region of the Czech Republic. It has about 1,900 inhabitants.

== Administrative division ==
Bystřany consists of five municipal parts (in brackets population according to the 2021 census):

- Bystřany (1,147)
- Nechvalice (17)
- Nové Dvory (56)
- Světice (520)
- Úpořiny (158)

== Geography ==
Bystřany is located about 2 kilometres (1 mi) southeast of Teplice and 12 km (7 mi) southwest of Ústí nad Labem. It lies in the Central Bohemian Uplands. The highest point is the hill Na Lišce at 316 m (1,037 ft) above sea level. The Bystřice Stream flows through the municipality. The Bílina River flows along the southern municipal border.

== History ==
The village of Horušany in the Bystřany area was first mentioned in 1238. The first written mention of Bystřany is from 1509. Bystřany became an industrial village in the 19th century and remained that way into the 20th century.

== Demographics ==
Historical population

Year	Pop.	±%
1869	745	—
1880	1,244	+67.0%
1890	1,401	+12.6%
1900	2,224	+58.7%
1910	2,502	+12.5%

Year	Pop.	±%
1921	2,469	−1.3%
1930	2,945	+19.3%
1950	1,985	−32.6%
1961	2,177	+9.7%
1970	2,165	−0.6%

Year	Pop.	±%
1980	1,996	−7.8%
1991	1,814	−9.1%
2001	1,841	+1.5%
2011	1,866	+1.4%
2021	1,898	+1.7%

Source: Censuses

== Transport ==
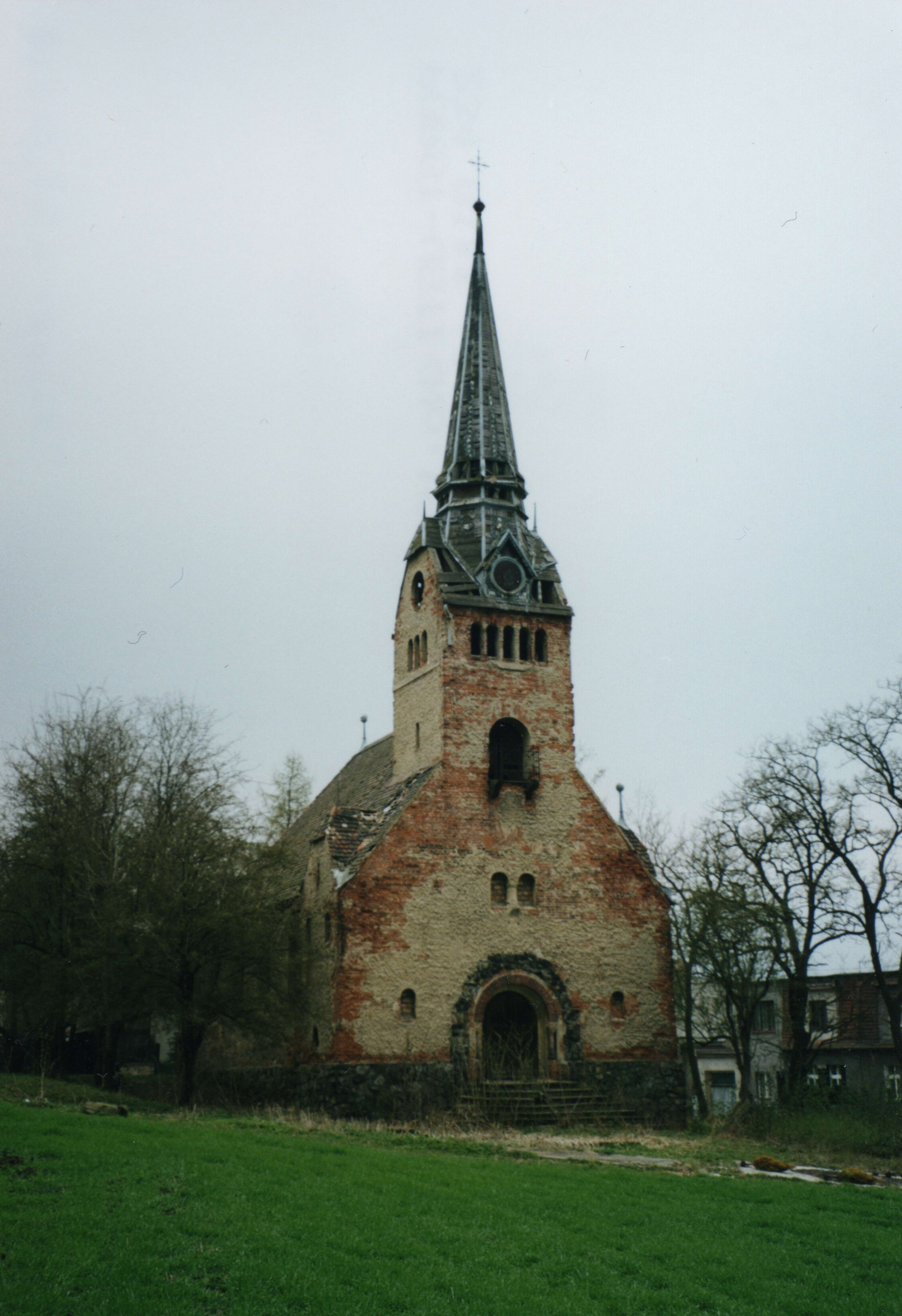
Protestant church

The I/8 road (the section from Teplice to Lovosice) runs through the municipality. The R/63 expressway splits from it and connects Bystřany with the D8 motorway. Both these roads forms parts of the European route E442.

Bystřany is located in the railway line Teplice–Radejčín.

== Sights ==
A cultural monument is the Chapel of the Immaculate Conception, located in the old part of Bystřany. It is a small Neoclassical building dating from 1811.

A notable building is the Protestant church from the end of the 19th century.

The Bílina River is bridged by a stone bridge from the second half of the 18th century, which is a technical monument.
