= Bžany (Teplice District) =

- Municipality
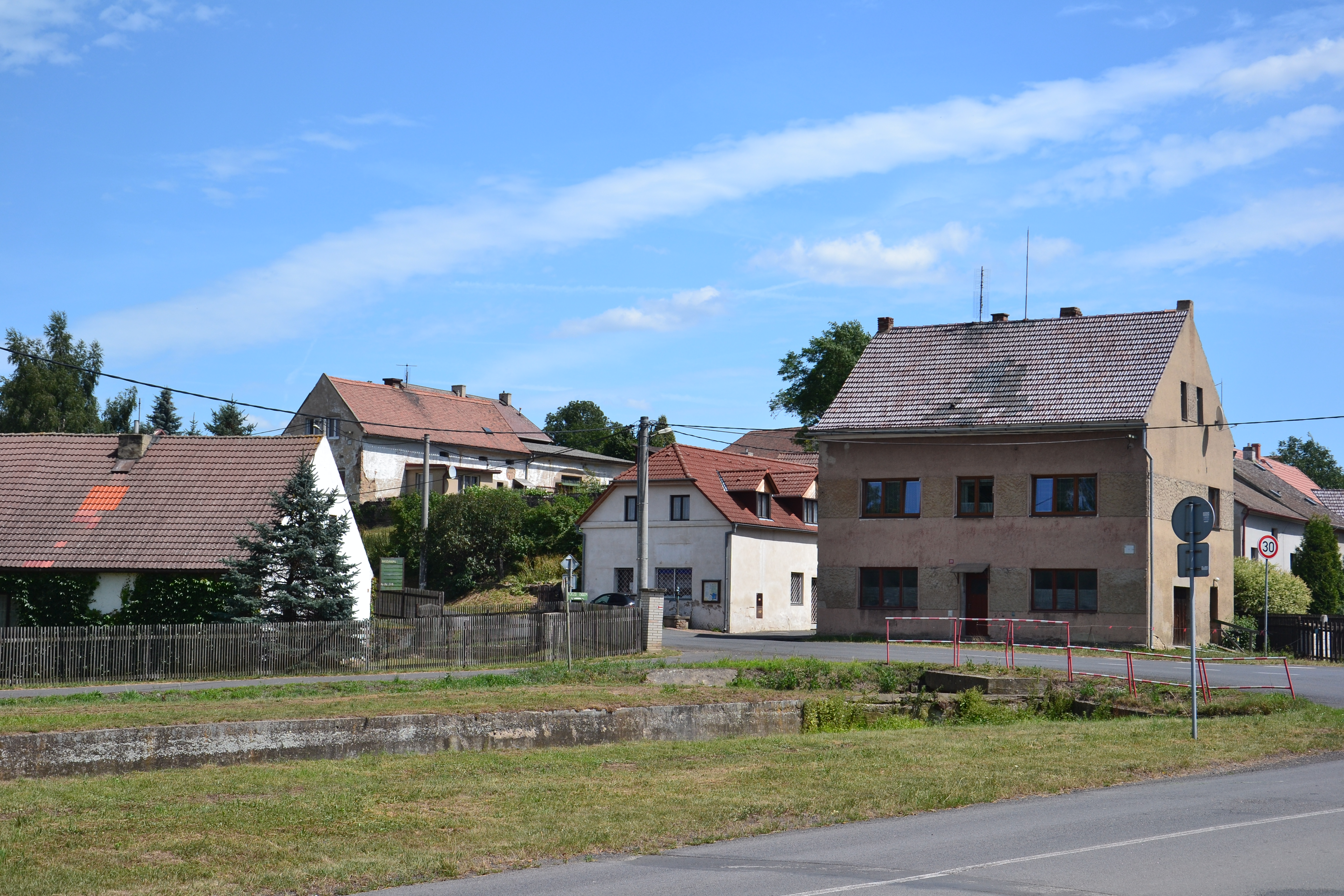
- Centre of Bžany

- Flag Coat of arms

- Location in the Czech Republic
- Coordinates: 50°35′22″N 13°52′44″E
- Country: Czech Republic
- Region: Ústí nad Labem
- District: Teplice
- First mentioned: 1303

Area
  - Total: 11.15 km^{2} (4.31 sq mi)
- Elevation: 230 m (750 ft)

Population (2026-01-01)
  - Total: 916
  - Density: 82.2/km^{2} (213/sq mi)
- Time zone: UTC+1 (CET)
  - Summer (DST): UTC+2 (CEST)
- Postal code: 415 01
- Website: www.bzany.cz

Bžany (until 1921 Vebžany; German: Webeschan) is a municipality and village in Teplice District in the Ústí nad Labem Region of the Czech Republic. It has about 900 inhabitants.

Bžany lies approximately 7 kilometres (4 mi) south-east of Teplice, 14 km (9 mi) south-west of Ústí nad Labem, and 68 km (42 mi) north-west of Prague.

== Administrative division ==
Bžany consists of eight municipal parts (in brackets population according to the 2021 census):

- Bžany (204)
- Bukovice (69)
- Hradiště (203)
- Lbín (105)
- Lhenice (98)
- Lysec (93)
- Mošnov (71)
- Pytlíkov (41)

== Demographics ==
Historical population
Year	Pop.	±%
1869	1,184	—
1880	1,423	+20.2%
1890	1,489	+4.6%
1900	1,716	+15.2%
1910	2,048	+19.3%
1921	2,124	+3.7%
1930	2,208	+4.0%
1950	1,351	−38.8%
1961	1,304	−3.5%
1970	1,138	−12.7%
1980	916	−19.5%
1991	663	−27.6%
2001	705	+6.3%
2011	812	+15.2%
2021	884	+8.9%
Source: Censuses
