= Žalany =

- Municipality
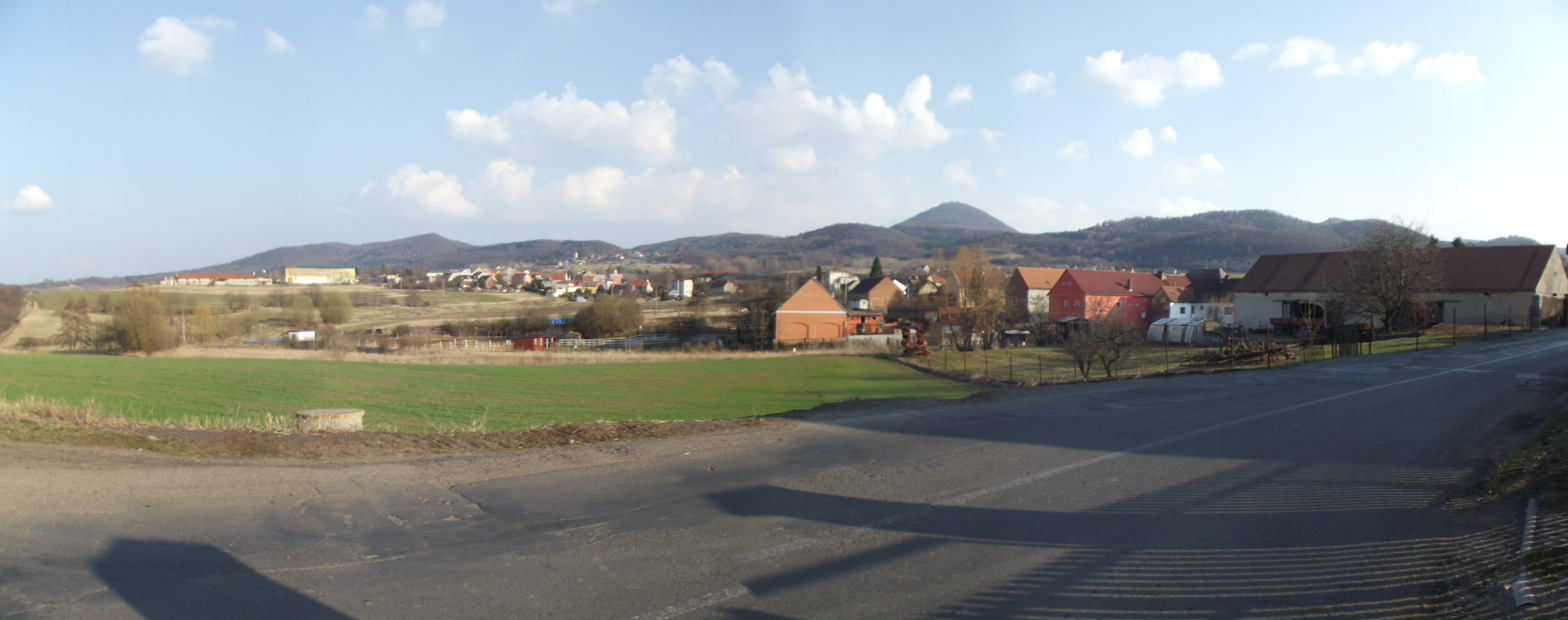
- Panorama of Žalany

- Location in the Czech Republic
- Coordinates: 50°35′22″N 13°54′32″E
- Country: Czech Republic
- Region: Ústí nad Labem
- District: Teplice
- First mentioned: 1400

Area
  - Total: 9.88 km^{2} (3.81 sq mi)
- Elevation: 237 m (778 ft)

Population (2026-01-01)
  - Total: 511
  - Density: 51.7/km^{2} (134/sq mi)
- Time zone: UTC+1 (CET)
  - Summer (DST): UTC+2 (CEST)
- Postal code: 417 63
- Website: www.zalany.cz

Žalany (German: Schallan) is a municipality and village in Teplice District in the Ústí nad Labem Region of the Czech Republic. It has about 500 inhabitants.

Žalany lies approximately 9 kilometres (6 mi) south-east of Teplice, 13 km (8 mi) south-west of Ústí nad Labem, and 67 km (42 mi) north-west of Prague.

== Administrative division ==
Žalany consists of three municipal parts (in brackets population according to the 2021 census):

- Žalany (432)
- Černčice (17)
- Lelov (62)

== Demographics ==
Historical population
Year	Pop.	±%
1869	660	—
1880	766	+16.1%
1890	765	−0.1%
1900	828	+8.2%
1910	965	+16.5%
1921	1,001	+3.7%
1930	1,090	+8.9%
1950	724	−33.6%
1961	681	−5.9%
1970	559	−17.9%
1980	528	−5.5%
1991	437	−17.2%
2001	456	+4.3%
2011	501	+9.9%
2021	511	+2.0%
Source: Censuses
