= Modlany =

- Municipality
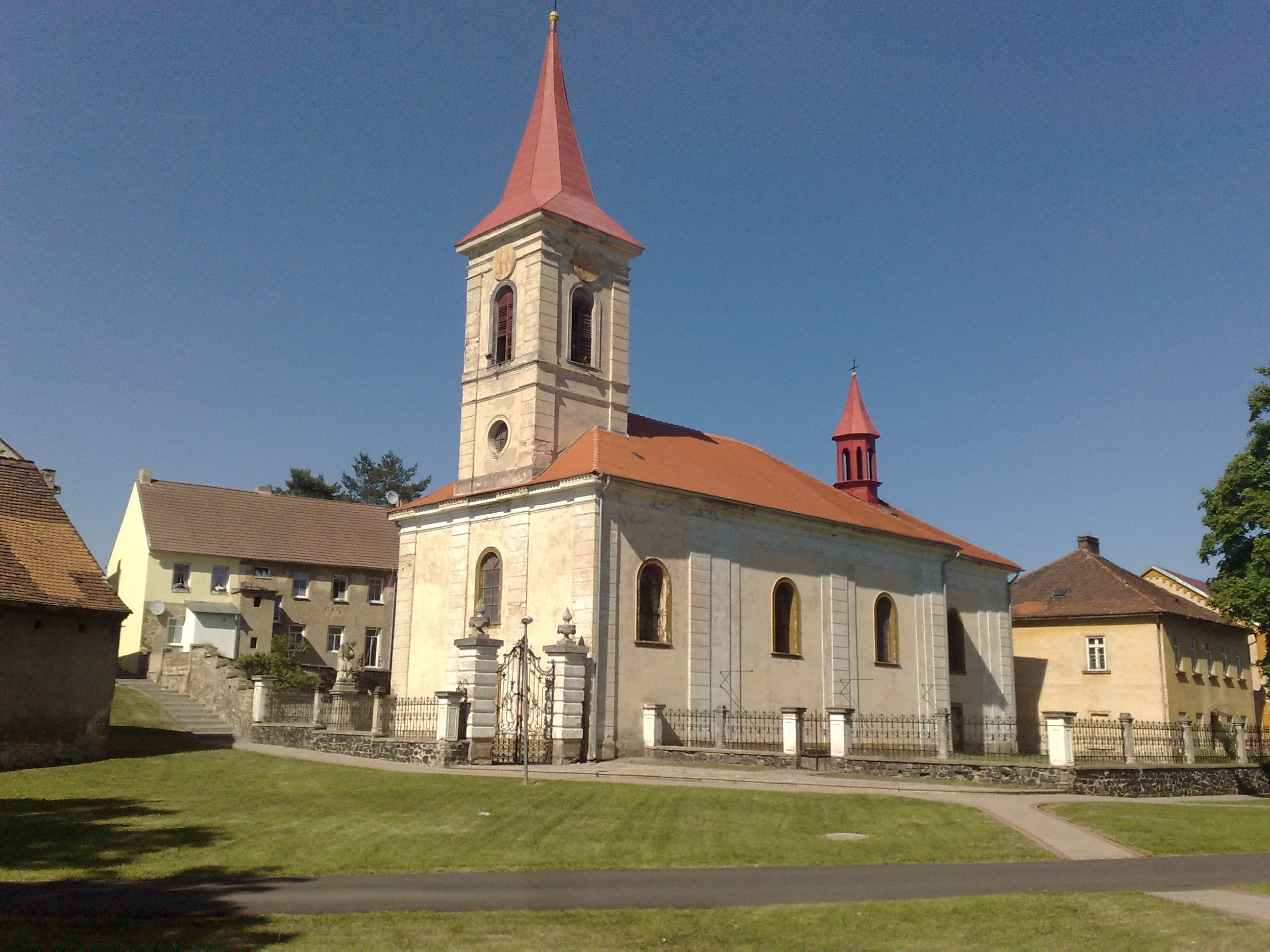
- Church of Saint Apollinaris

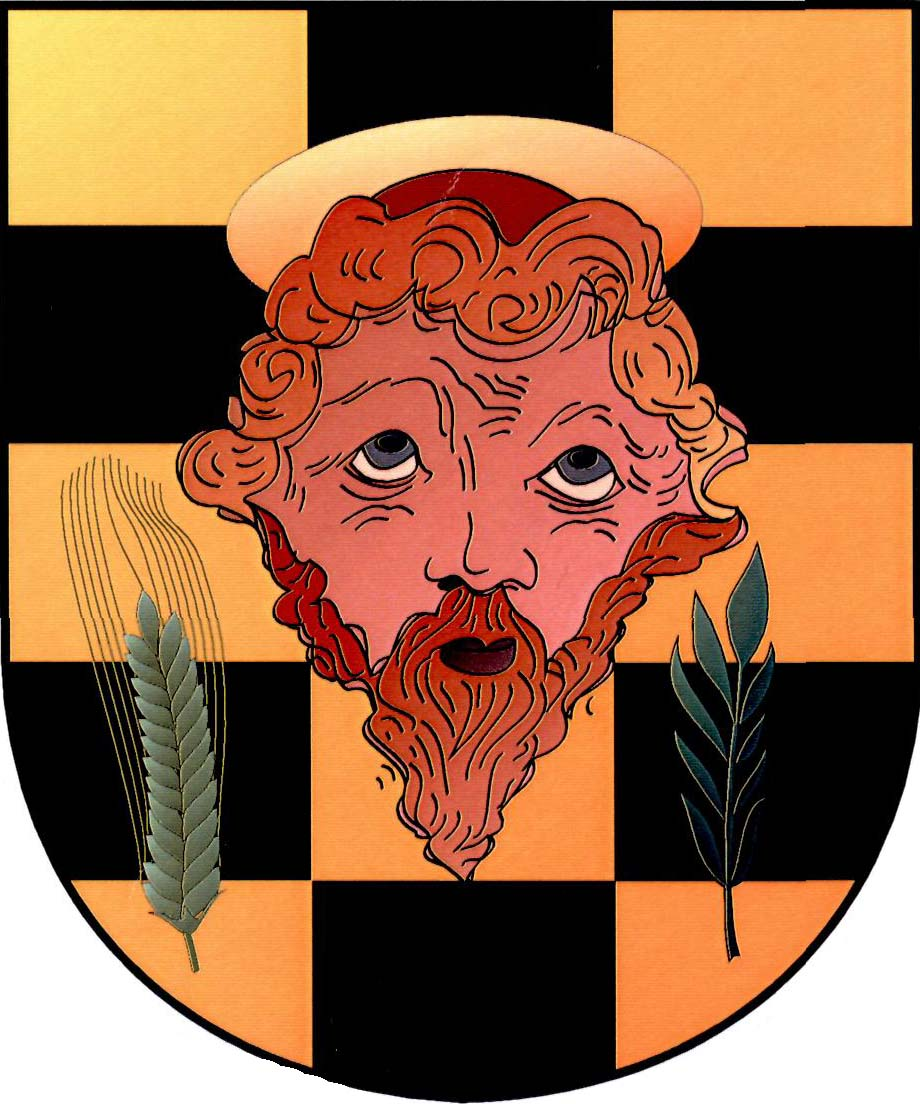
- Flag Coat of arms

- Location in the Czech Republic
- Coordinates: 50°39′2″N 13°53′44″E
- Country: Czech Republic
- Region: Ústí nad Labem
- District: Teplice
- Founded: 1328

Area
  - Total: 10.11 km^{2} (3.90 sq mi)
- Elevation: 188 m (617 ft)

Population (2026-01-01)
  - Total: 1,186
  - Density: 117.3/km^{2} (303.8/sq mi)
- Time zone: UTC+1 (CET)
  - Summer (DST): UTC+2 (CEST)
- Postal code: 417 13
- Website: www.modlany.cz

Modlany (German: Modlan) is a municipality and village in Teplice District in the Ústí nad Labem Region of the Czech Republic. It has about 1,200 inhabitants.

== Administrative division ==
Modlany consists of five municipal parts (in brackets population according to the 2021 census):

- Modlany (356)
- Drahkov (287)
- Kvítkov (82)
- Suché (99)
- Věšťany (206)

== Etymology ==
The origin of the name is unsure. The name was either derived from the personal name Modla, meaning "the village of Modla's people", or from the word modla ('idol' in modern Czech, but in old Czech also 'a place designated for prayer'), meaning "the village of people living near a modla".

== Geography ==
Modlany is located about 4 kilometres (2 mi) east of Teplice and 9 km (6 mi) west of Ústí nad Labem. The northern part of the municipality with the Modlany village lies in the Most Basin and the southern part with the rest of the villages lies in the Central Bohemian Uplands. The highest point is at 324 m (1,063 ft) above sea level. The stream Modlanský potok flows through the northern part of the municipality. The Modlany and Kateřina reservoirs, both partly located in the municipal territory, are built on the stream.

== History ==
Modlany was founded in 1328. Originally it belonged to the Kyšperk Castle estate. In 1665, the village was acquired by the Society of Jesus, who founded a school here year later. In 1780, coal mining began and many shafts were created around the village.

Žichlice was a village that was abandoned in 1988 because of expansion of coal mining. The area of the former village is now part of the municipality of Modlany.

== Demographics ==
Historical population

| Year | Pop. | ±% |
|---|---|---|
| 1869 | 1,274 | — |
| 1880 | 2,240 | +75.8% |
| 1890 | 2,501 | +11.7% |
| 1900 | 3,070 | +22.8% |
| 1910 | 3,342 | +8.9% |

| Year | Pop. | ±% |
|---|---|---|
| 1921 | 2,259 | −32.4% |
| 1930 | 2,220 | −1.7% |
| 1950 | 1,150 | −48.2% |
| 1961 | 1,220 | +6.1% |
| 1970 | 970 | −20.5% |

| Year | Pop. | ±% |
|---|---|---|
| 1980 | 816 | −15.9% |
| 1991 | 643 | −21.2% |
| 2001 | 720 | +12.0% |
| 2011 | 919 | +27.6% |
| 2021 | 1,030 | +12.1% |

Source: Censuses

== Transport ==
The R/63 expressway (part of the European route E442), which connects Teplice with the D8 motorway, briefly crosses the municipal territory in the south. Otherwise, there are no railways or other major roads passing through the municipality.

== Sights ==
The most valuable building is the Church of Saint Apollinaris. It was built in 1687–1691.
