= Jeníkov (Teplice District) =

- Municipality
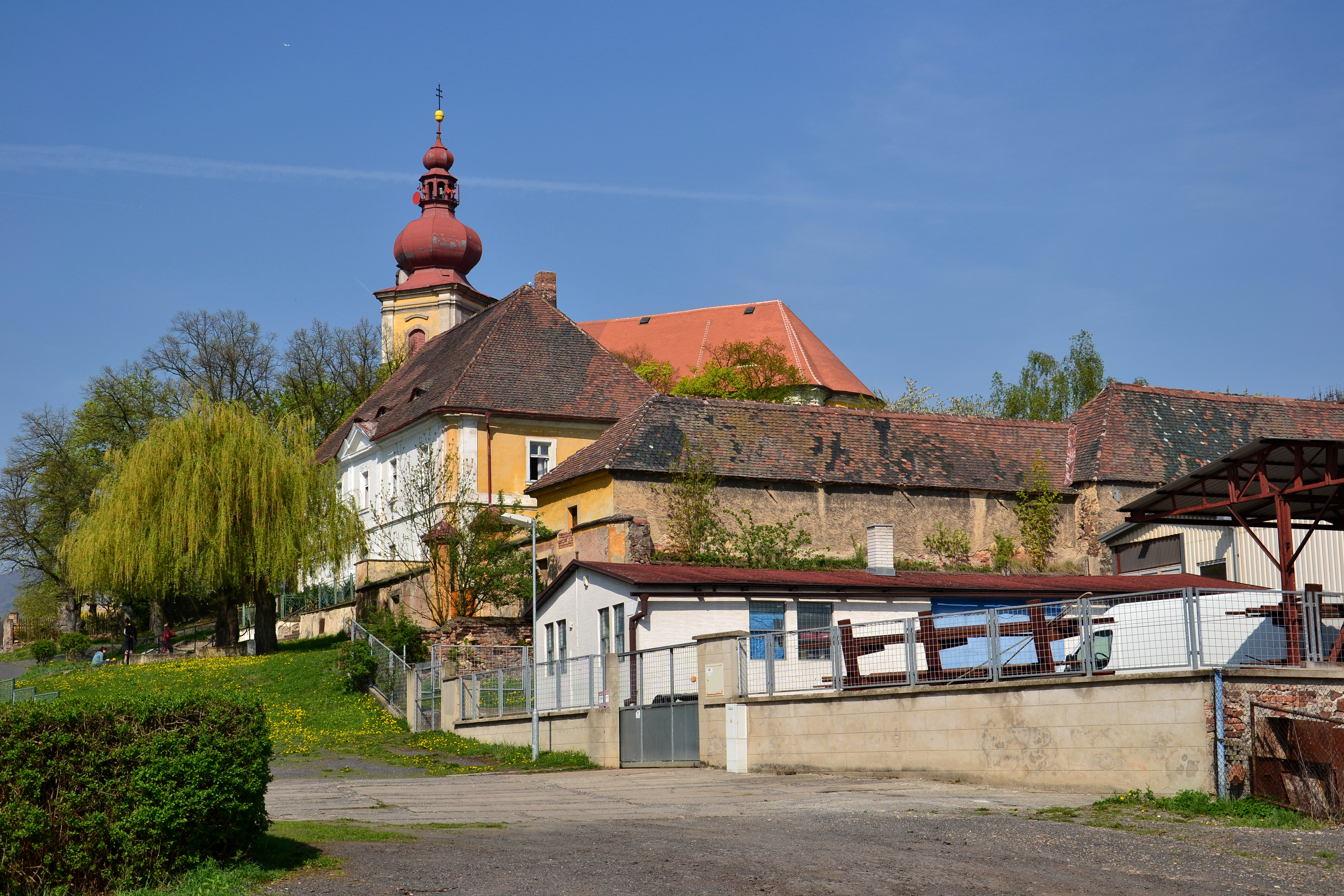
- Centre of Jeníkov with the Church of Saints Peter and Paul

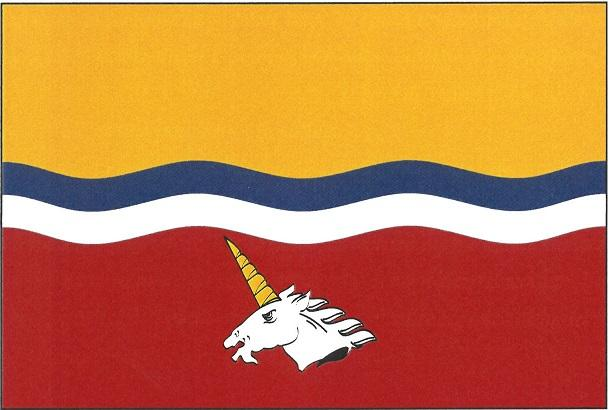
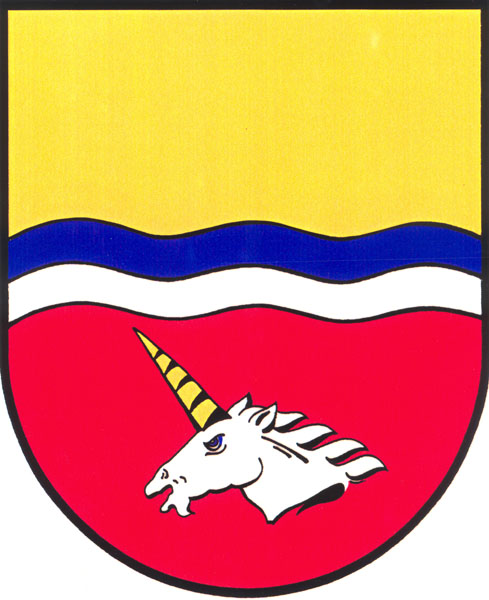
- Flag Coat of arms

- Location in the Czech Republic
- Coordinates: 50°37′43″N 13°44′56″E
- Country: Czech Republic
- Region: Ústí nad Labem
- District: Teplice
- First mentioned: 1352

Area
  - Total: 7.74 km^{2} (2.99 sq mi)
- Elevation: 250 m (820 ft)

Population (2026-01-01)
  - Total: 860
  - Density: 110/km^{2} (290/sq mi)
- Time zone: UTC+1 (CET)
  - Summer (DST): UTC+2 (CEST)
- Postal code: 417 24
- Website: www.jenikov.cz

Jeníkov (German: Janegg) is a municipality and village in Teplice District in the Ústí nad Labem Region of the Czech Republic. It has about 900 inhabitants.

Jeníkov lies approximately 6 kilometres (4 mi) west of Teplice, 22 km (14 mi) west of Ústí nad Labem, and 78 km (48 mi) north-west of Prague.

== Administrative division ==
Jeníkov consists of two municipal parts (in brackets population according to the 2021 census):

- Jeníkov (315)
- Oldřichov (593)

== Demographics ==
Historical population
Year	Pop.	±%
1869	871	—
1880	1,080	+24.0%
1890	1,506	+39.4%
1900	1,958	+30.0%
1910	2,129	+8.7%
1921	2,188	+2.8%
1930	2,414	+10.3%
1950	1,487	−38.4%
1961	1,248	−16.1%
1970	1,087	−12.9%
1980	938	−13.7%
1991	779	−17.0%
2001	816	+4.7%
2011	884	+8.3%
2021	908	+2.7%
Source: Censuses
