= Zvíkov =

Zvíkov may refer to places in the Czech Republic:

- Zvíkov (České Budějovice District), a municipality and village in the South Bohemian Region
- Zvíkov (Český Krumlov District), a municipality and village in the South Bohemian Region
- Zvíkov Castle, a castle in Zvíkovské Podhradí in the South Bohemian Region
- Zvíkov, a village and part of Boharyně in the Hradec Králové Region
- Zvíkov, a village and part of Hlavňovice in the Plzeň Region

== See also ==
- Zvíkovec
- Zvíkovské Podhradí
