= Mirkovice =

- Municipality
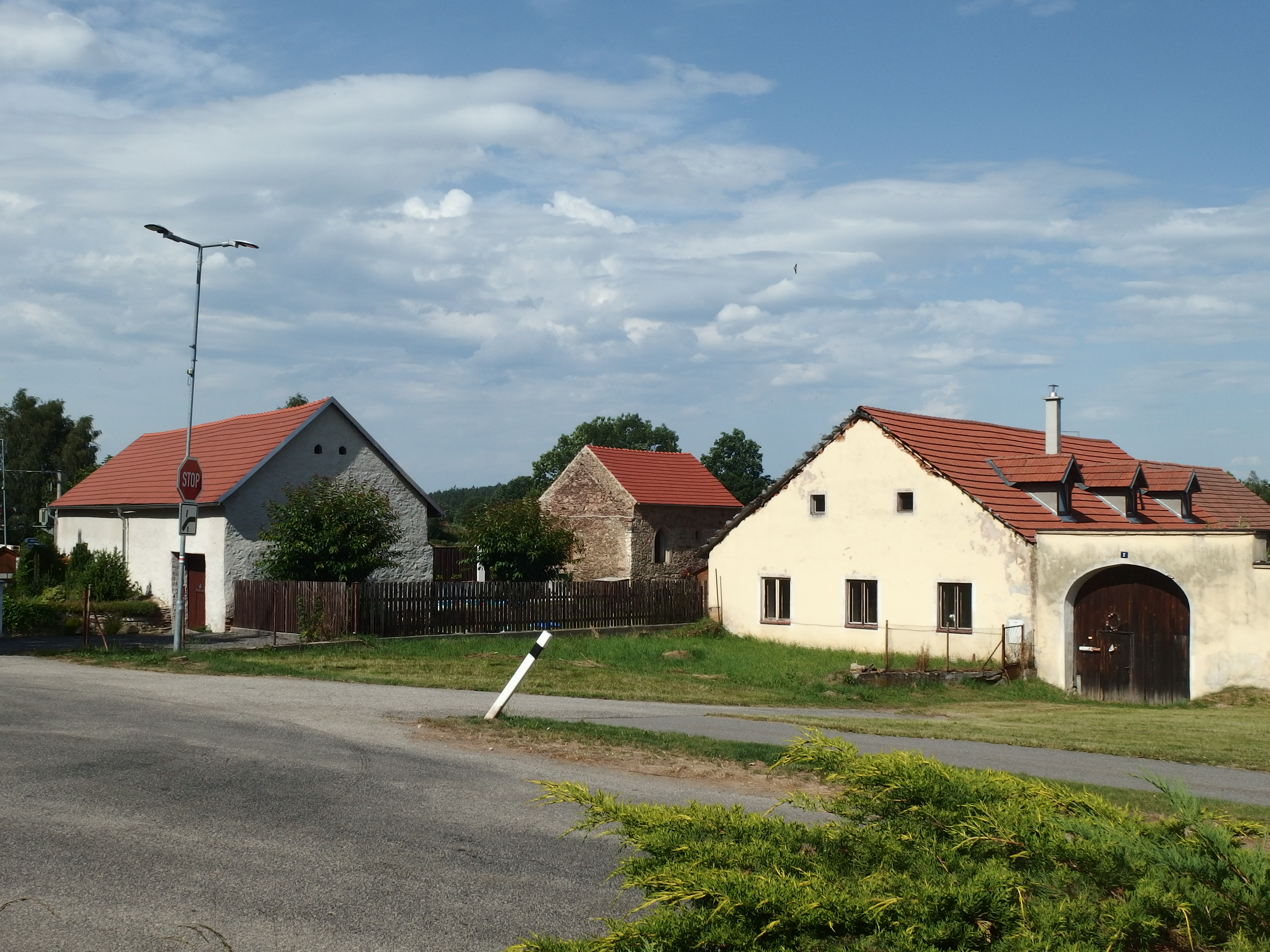
- Centre of Mirkovice

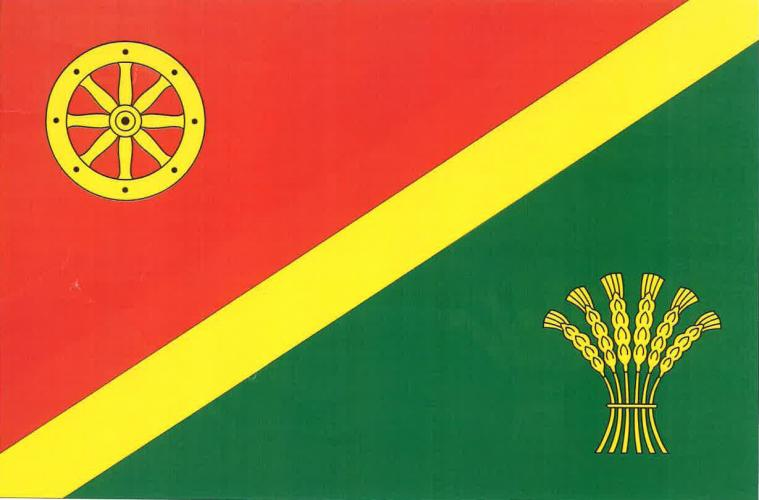
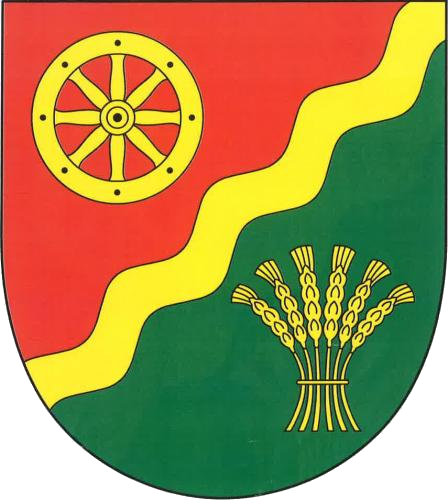
- Flag Coat of arms

- Location in the Czech Republic
- Coordinates: 48°48′40″N 14°23′29″E
- Country: Czech Republic
- Region: South Bohemian
- District: Český Krumlov
- First mentioned: 1362

Area
  - Total: 15.49 km^{2} (5.98 sq mi)
- Elevation: 540 m (1,770 ft)

Population (2026-01-01)
  - Total: 564
  - Density: 36.4/km^{2} (94.3/sq mi)
- Time zone: UTC+1 (CET)
  - Summer (DST): UTC+2 (CEST)
- Postal code: 382 32
- Website: www.mirkovice.cz

Mirkovice (German: Mirkowitz) is a municipality and village in Český Krumlov District in the South Bohemian Region of the Czech Republic. It has about 600 inhabitants. The village centre is well preserved and is protected as a village monument zone.

Mirkovice lies approximately 6 kilometres (4 mi) east of Český Krumlov, 19 km (12 mi) south of České Budějovice, and 142 km (88 mi) south of Prague.

== Administrative division ==
Mirkovice consists of six municipal parts (in brackets population according to the 2021 census):

- Mirkovice (222)
- Chabičovice (49)
- Malčice (45)
- Svachova Lhotka (10)
- Zahrádka (77)
- Žaltice (53)

== Demographics ==
Historical population
Year	Pop.	±%
1869	668	—
1880	659	−1.3%
1890	624	−5.3%
1900	676	+8.3%
1910	692	+2.4%
1921	688	−0.6%
1930	619	−10.0%
1950	368	−40.5%
1961	446	+21.2%
1970	406	−9.0%
1980	397	−2.2%
1991	342	−13.9%
2001	398	+16.4%
2011	446	+12.1%
2021	456	+2.2%
Source: Censuses
