= Dolní Třebonín =

- Municipality
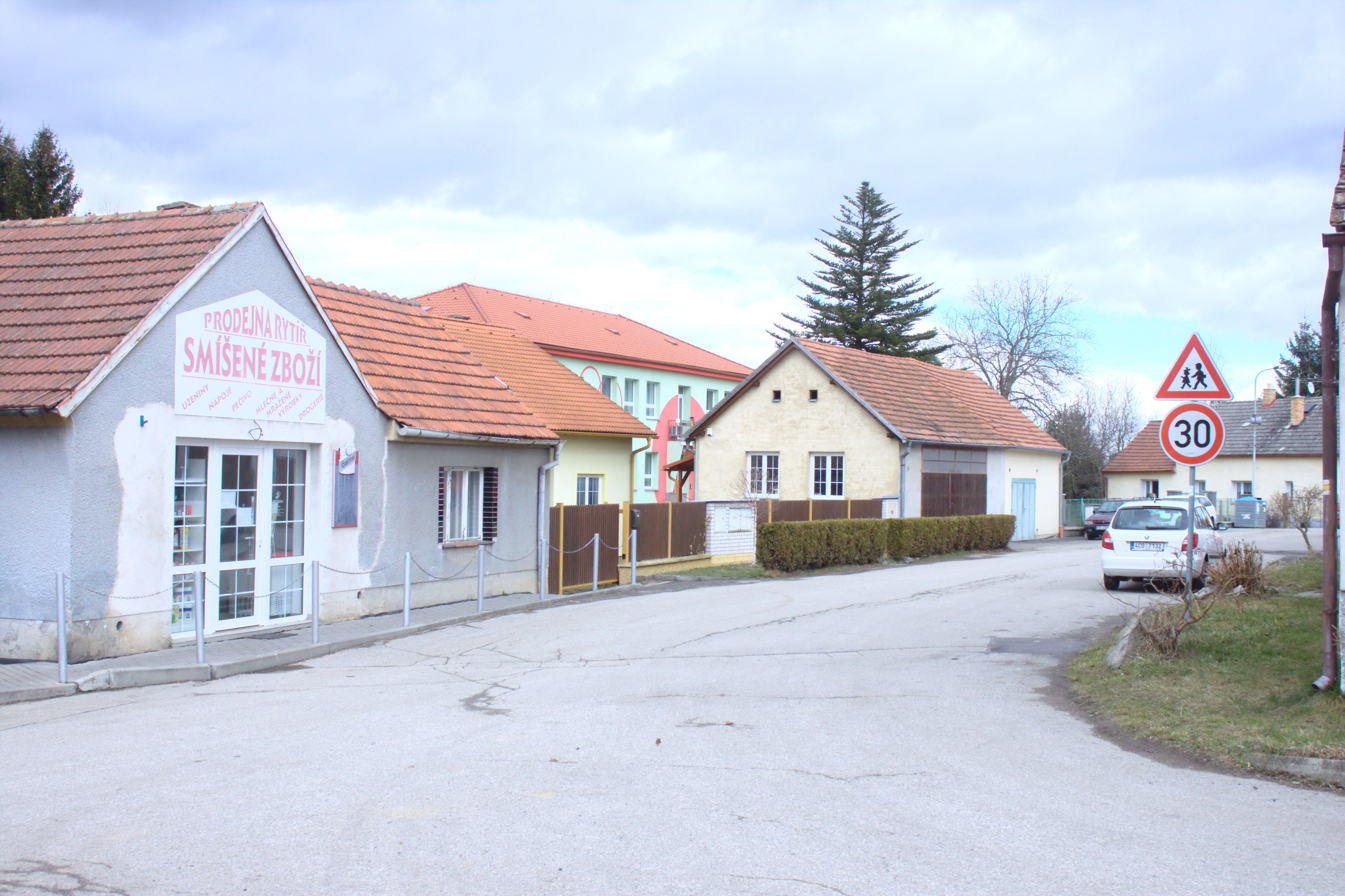
- Centre of Dolní Třebonín

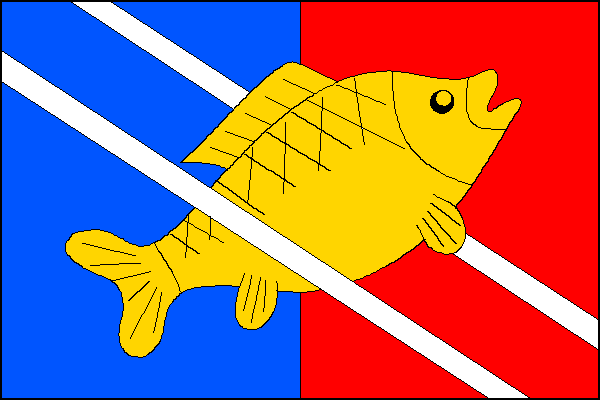
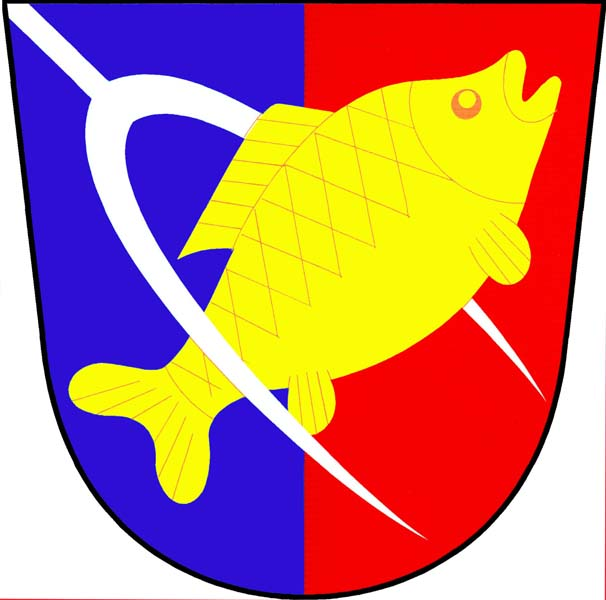
- Flag Coat of arms

- Location in the Czech Republic
- Coordinates: 48°51′20″N 14°24′35″E
- Country: Czech Republic
- Region: South Bohemian
- District: Český Krumlov
- First mentioned: 1375

Area
  - Total: 20.43 km^{2} (7.89 sq mi)
- Elevation: 424 m (1,391 ft)

Population (2026-01-01)
  - Total: 1,356
  - Density: 66.37/km^{2} (171.9/sq mi)
- Time zone: UTC+1 (CET)
  - Summer (DST): UTC+2 (CEST)
- Postal codes: 382 01, 382 32
- Website: www.dolnitrebonin.cz

Dolní Třebonín (German: Unter Breitenstein) is a municipality and village in Český Krumlov District in the South Bohemian Region of the Czech Republic. It has about 1,400 inhabitants.

Dolní Třebonín lies approximately 9 kilometres (6 mi) north-east of Český Krumlov, 14 km (9 mi) south of České Budějovice, and 137 km (85 mi) south of Prague.

== Administrative division ==
Dolní Třebonín consists of eight municipal parts (in brackets population according to the 2021 census):

- Dolní Třebonín (1,060)
- Čertyně (47)
- Dolní Svince (27)
- Horní Svince (26)
- Horní Třebonín (42)
- Prostřední Svince (64)
- Štěkře (20)
- Záluží (71)

== Demographics ==
Historical population
Year	Pop.	±%
1869	1,259	—
1880	1,260	+0.1%
1890	1,239	−1.7%
1900	1,272	+2.7%
1910	1,232	−3.1%
1921	1,174	−4.7%
1930	1,051	−10.5%
1950	723	−31.2%
1961	641	−11.3%
1970	670	+4.5%
1980	621	−7.3%
1991	634	+2.1%
2001	658	+3.8%
2011	1,263	+91.9%
2021	1,357	+7.4%
Source: Censuses
