= Horní Dvořiště =

- Municipality
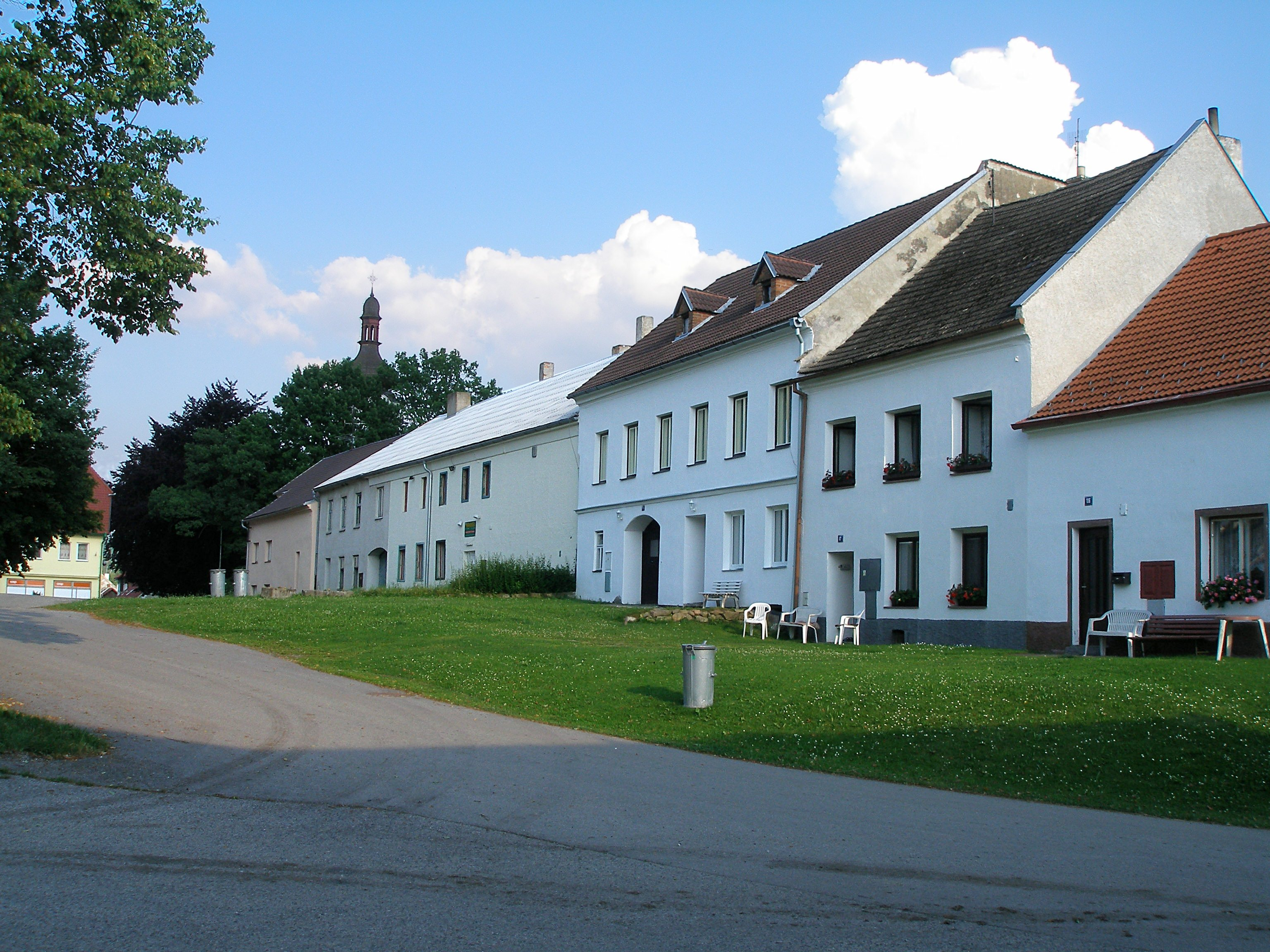
- Centre of Horní Dvořiště

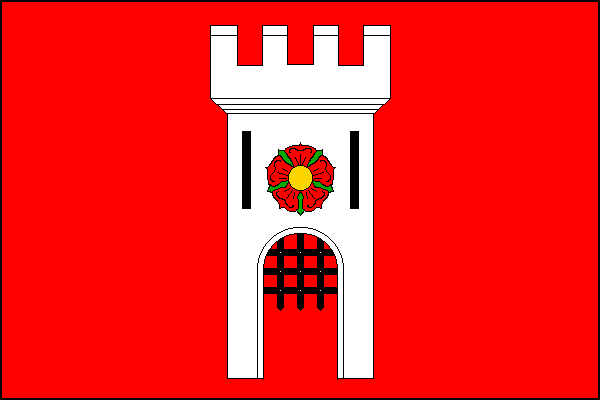
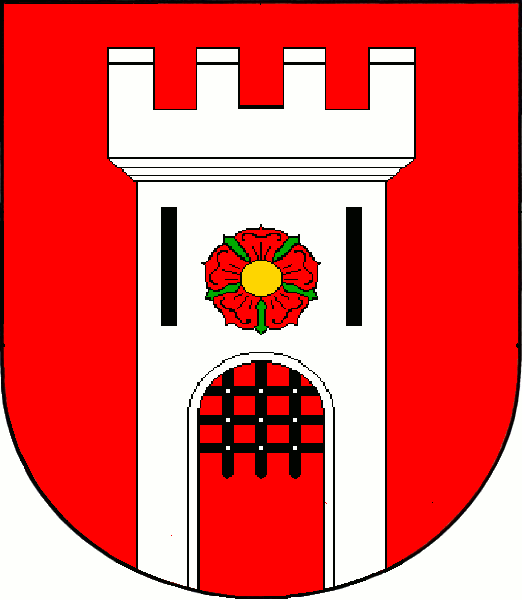
- Flag Coat of arms

- Location in the Czech Republic
- Coordinates: 48°36′14″N 14°24′21″E
- Country: Czech Republic
- Region: South Bohemian
- District: Český Krumlov
- First mentioned: 1278

Area
  - Total: 13.59 km^{2} (5.25 sq mi)
- Elevation: 651 m (2,136 ft)

Population (2026-01-01)
  - Total: 458
  - Density: 33.7/km^{2} (87.3/sq mi)
- Time zone: UTC+1 (CET)
  - Summer (DST): UTC+2 (CEST)
- Postal code: 382 93
- Website: www.hornidvoriste.cz

Horní Dvořiště (German: Oberhaid) is a municipality and village in Český Krumlov District in the South Bohemian Region of the Czech Republic. It has about 500 inhabitants.

== Administrative division ==
Horní Dvořiště consists of two municipal parts (in brackets population according to the 2021 census):

- Horní Dvořiště (304)
- Český Heršlák (120)

== Demographics ==
Historical population
Year	Pop.	±%
1869	1,038	—
1880	1,144	+10.2%
1890	1,151	+0.6%
1900	1,117	−3.0%
1910	1,113	−0.4%
1921	1,187	+6.6%
1930	1,400	+17.9%
1950	796	−43.1%
1961	630	−20.9%
1970	572	−9.2%
1980	612	+7.0%
1991	499	−18.5%
2001	505	+1.2%
2011	467	−7.5%
2021	424	−9.2%
Source: Censuses
