= Chlumec (Český Krumlov District) =

- Municipality
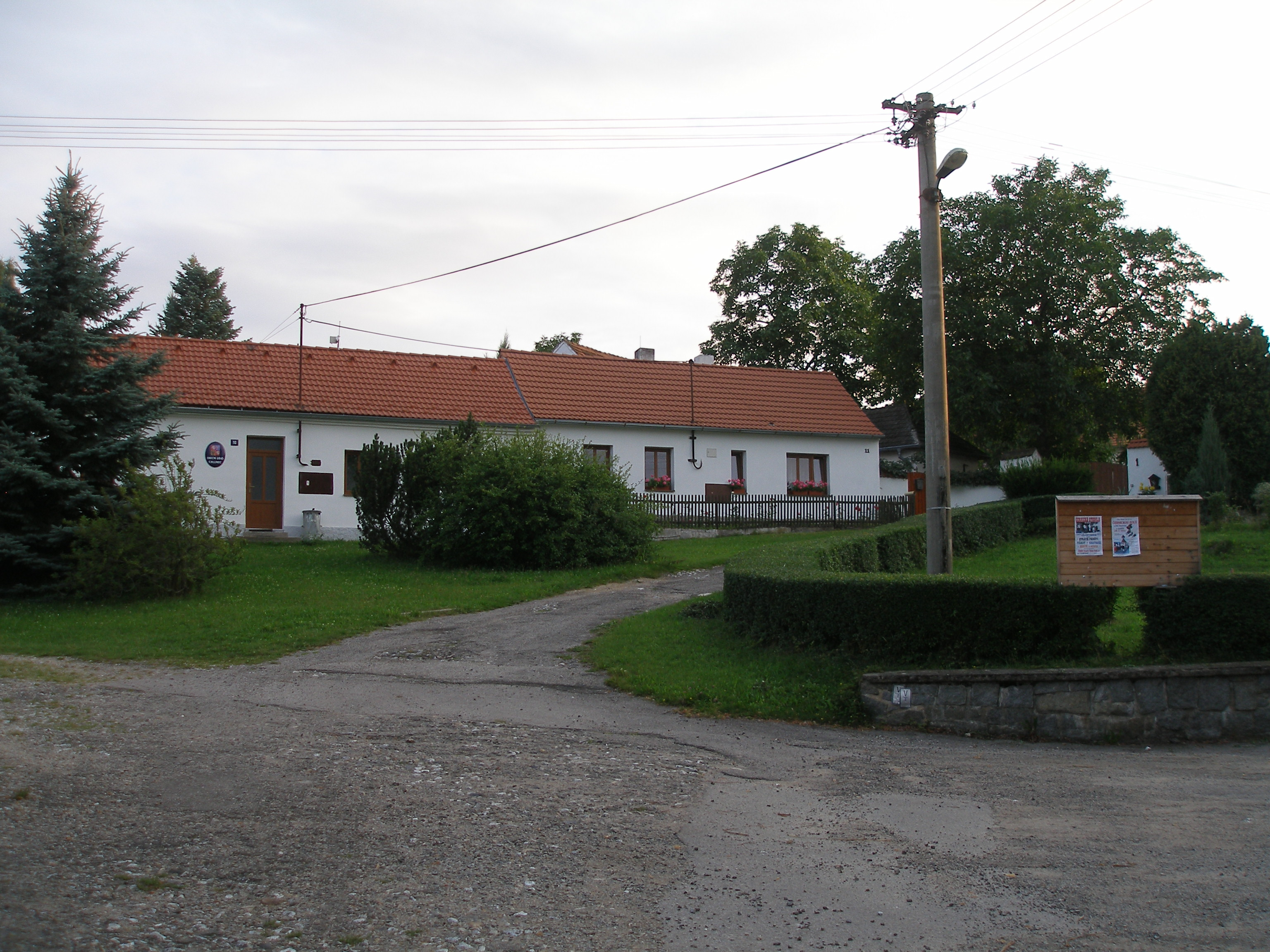
- Municipal office

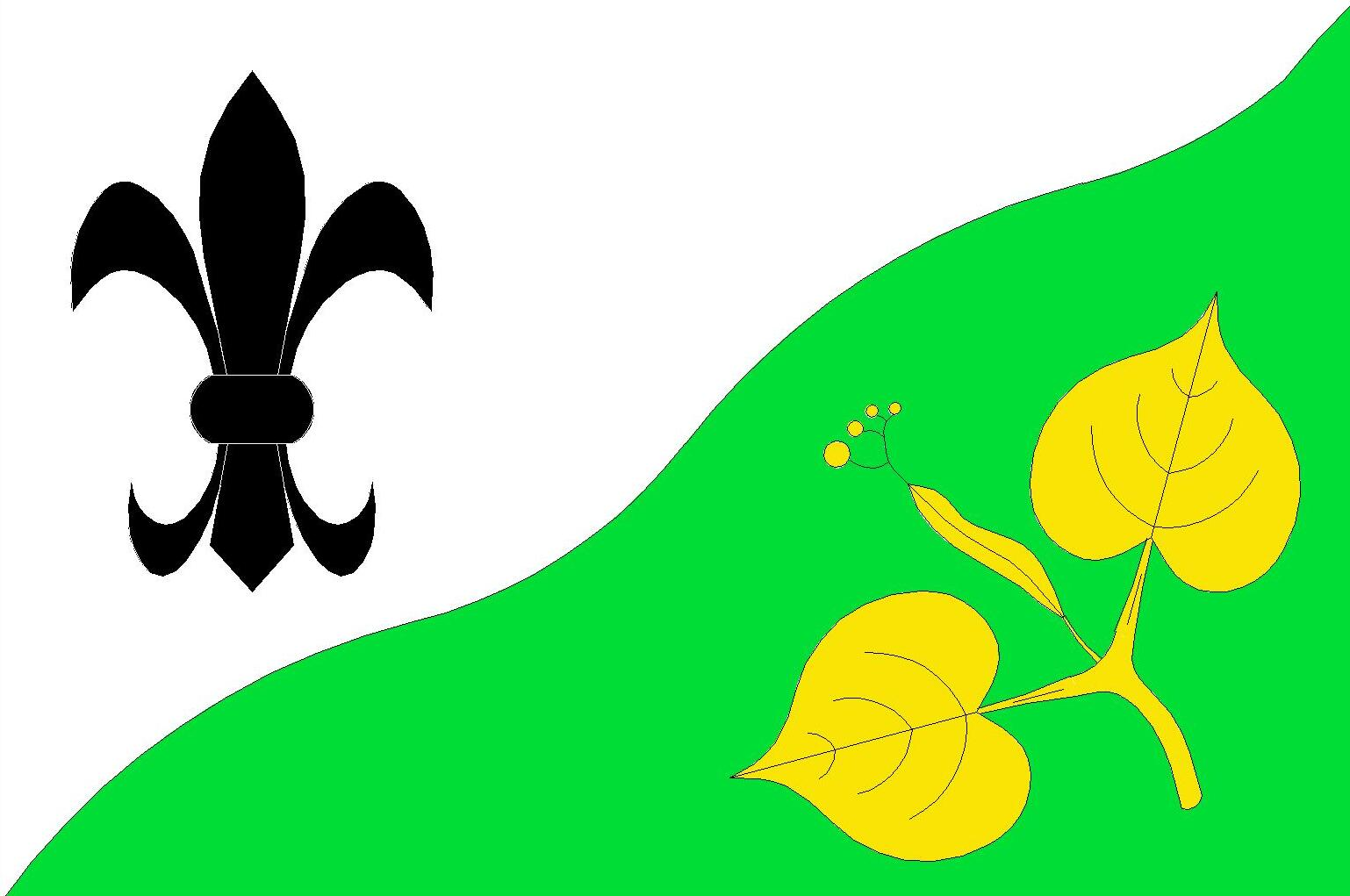
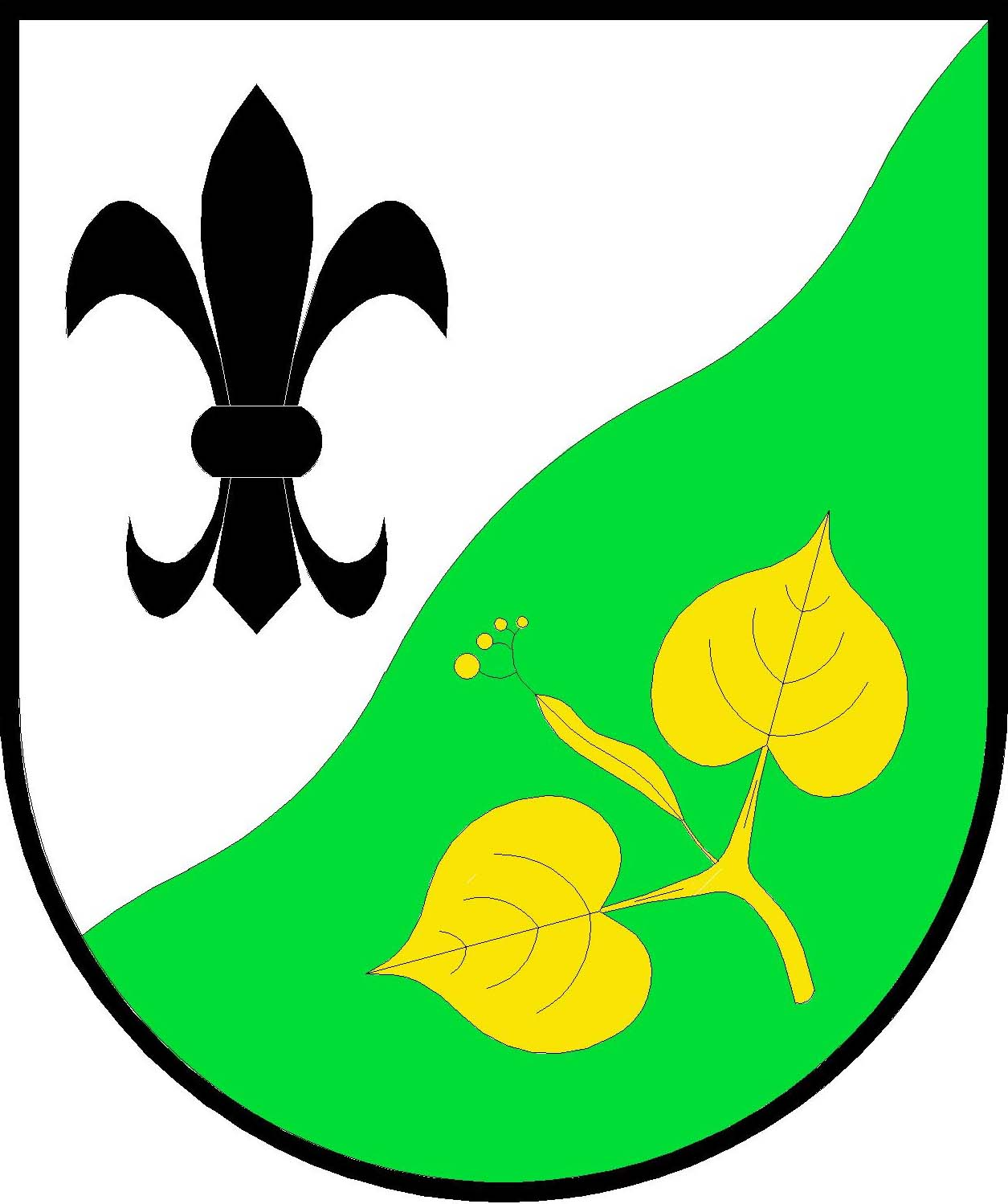
- Flag Coat of arms

- Location in the Czech Republic
- Coordinates: 48°52′13″N 14°23′45″E
- Country: Czech Republic
- Region: South Bohemian
- District: Český Krumlov
- First mentioned: 1445

Area
  - Total: 3.24 km^{2} (1.25 sq mi)
- Elevation: 525 m (1,722 ft)

Population (2026-01-01)
  - Total: 111
  - Density: 34.3/km^{2} (88.7/sq mi)
- Time zone: UTC+1 (CET)
  - Summer (DST): UTC+2 (CEST)
- Postal code: 382 32
- Website: www.obec-chlumec.cz

Chlumec is a municipality and village in Český Krumlov District in the South Bohemian Region of the Czech Republic. It has about 100 inhabitants. The village of Krnín within the municipality is well preserved and is protected as a village monument zone.

Chlumec lies approximately 9 kilometres (6 mi) north-east of Český Krumlov, 14 km (9 mi) south-west of České Budějovice, and 136 km (85 mi) south of Prague.

== Administrative division ==
Chlumec consists of two municipal parts (in brackets population according to the 2021 census):

- Chlumec (62)
- Krnín (39)

== Demographics ==
Historical population
Year	Pop.	±%
1869	144	—
1880	136	−5.6%
1890	153	+12.5%
1900	147	−3.9%
1910	142	−3.4%
1921	152	+7.0%
1930	147	−3.3%
1950	79	−46.3%
1961	89	+12.7%
1970	76	−14.6%
1980	63	−17.1%
1991	45	−28.6%
2001	55	+22.2%
2011	87	+58.2%
2021	101	+16.1%
Source: Censuses
