= Rožmitál na Šumavě =

- Municipality
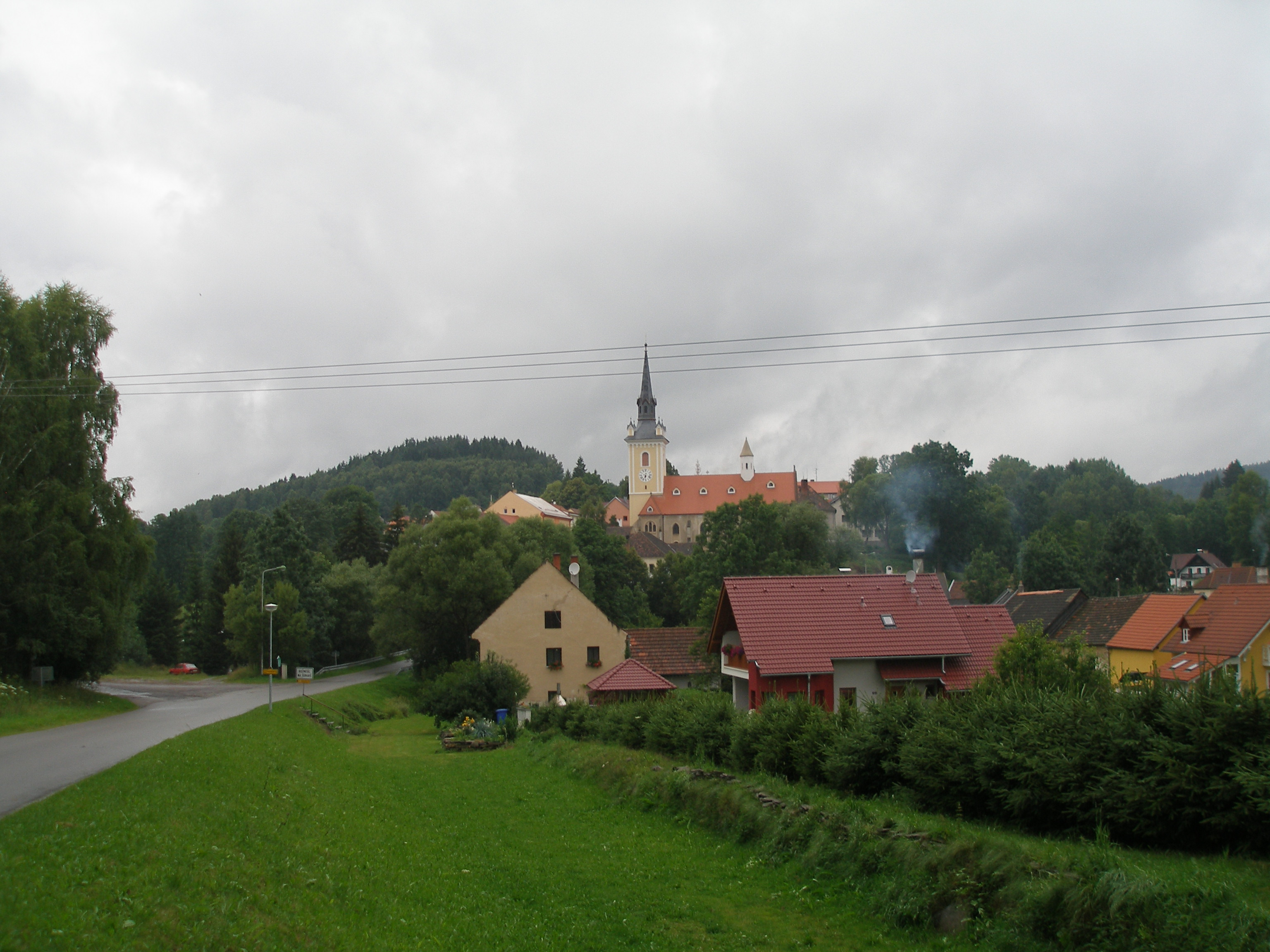
- View from the south

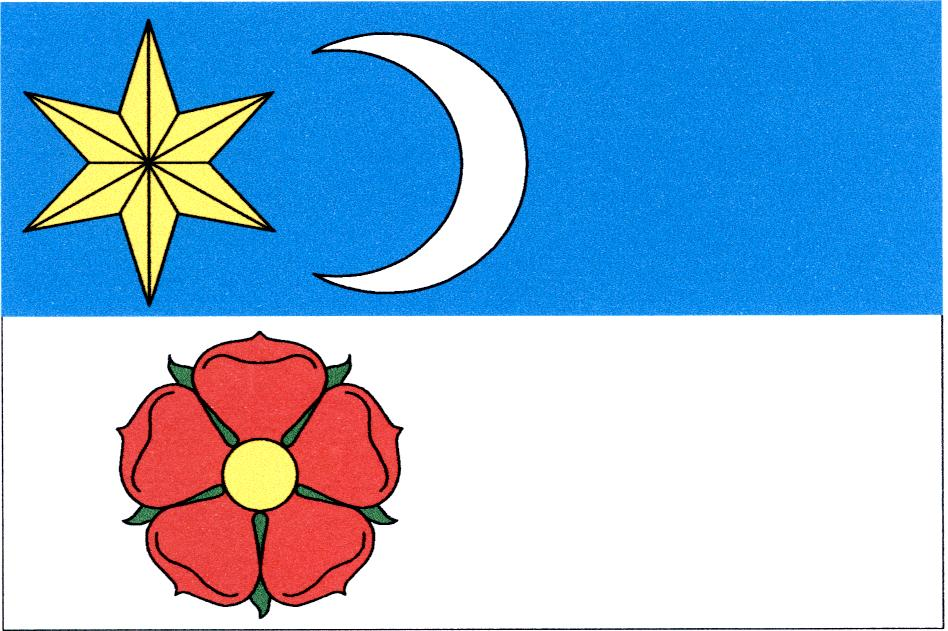
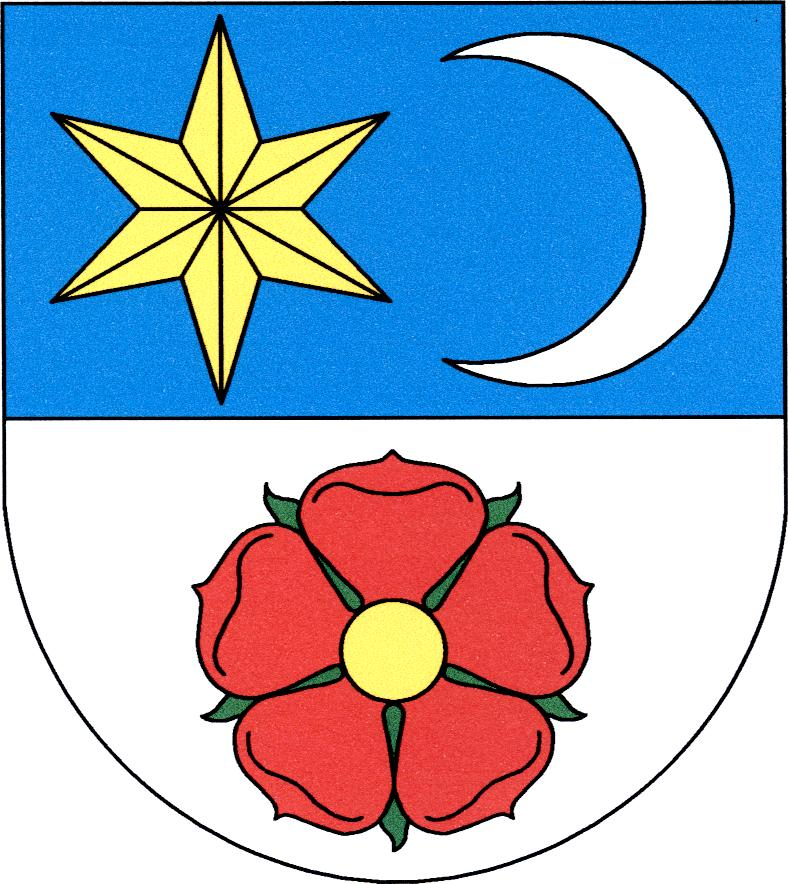
- Flag Coat of arms

- Location in the Czech Republic
- Coordinates: 48°42′5″N 14°23′18″E
- Country: Czech Republic
- Region: South Bohemian
- District: Český Krumlov
- First mentioned: 1259

Area
  - Total: 42.91 km^{2} (16.57 sq mi)
- Elevation: 623 m (2,044 ft)

Population (2026-01-01)
  - Total: 427
  - Density: 9.95/km^{2} (25.8/sq mi)
- Time zone: UTC+1 (CET)
  - Summer (DST): UTC+2 (CEST)
- Postal code: 382 92
- Website: www.rozmitalnasumave.cz

Rožmitál na Šumavě (German: Rosenthal im Böhmerwald) is a municipality and village in Český Krumlov District in the South Bohemian Region of the Czech Republic. It has about 400 inhabitants.

Rožmitál na Šumavě lies approximately 13 kilometres (8 mi) south of Český Krumlov, 31 km (19 mi) south of České Budějovice, and 154 km (96 mi) south of Prague.

== Administrative division ==
Rožmitál na Šumavě consists of five municipal parts (in brackets population according to the 2021 census):

- Rožmitál na Šumavě (302)
- Čeřín (18)
- Hněvanov (53)
- Michnice (11)
- Zahrádka (15)

== Demographics ==
Historical population
Year	Pop.	±%
1869	2,197	—
1880	2,160	−1.7%
1890	2,121	−1.8%
1900	2,092	−1.4%
1910	2,076	−0.8%
1921	1,892	−8.9%
1930	1,758	−7.1%
1950	393	−77.6%
1961	498	+26.7%
1970	447	−10.2%
1980	425	−4.9%
1991	363	−14.6%
2001	385	+6.1%
2011	374	−2.9%
2021	399	+6.7%
Source: Censuses
