= Omlenice =

- Municipality
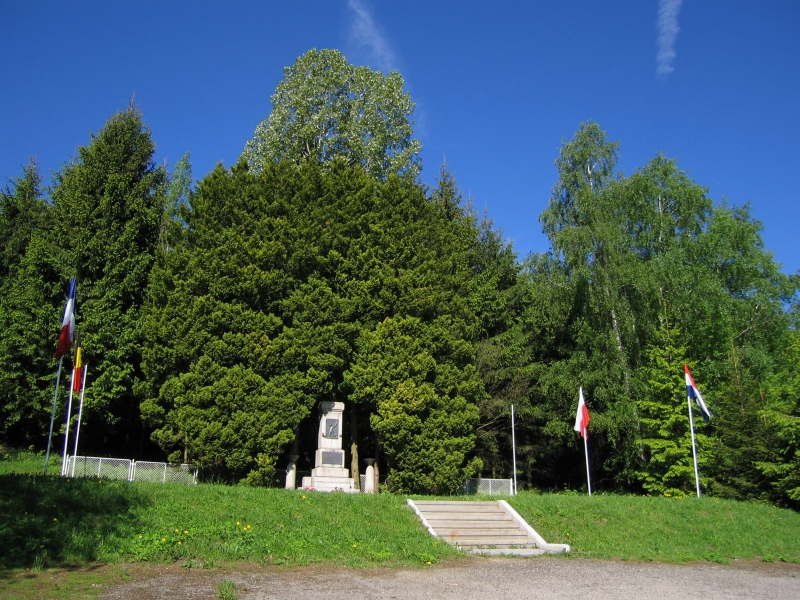
- Death Transport Memorial

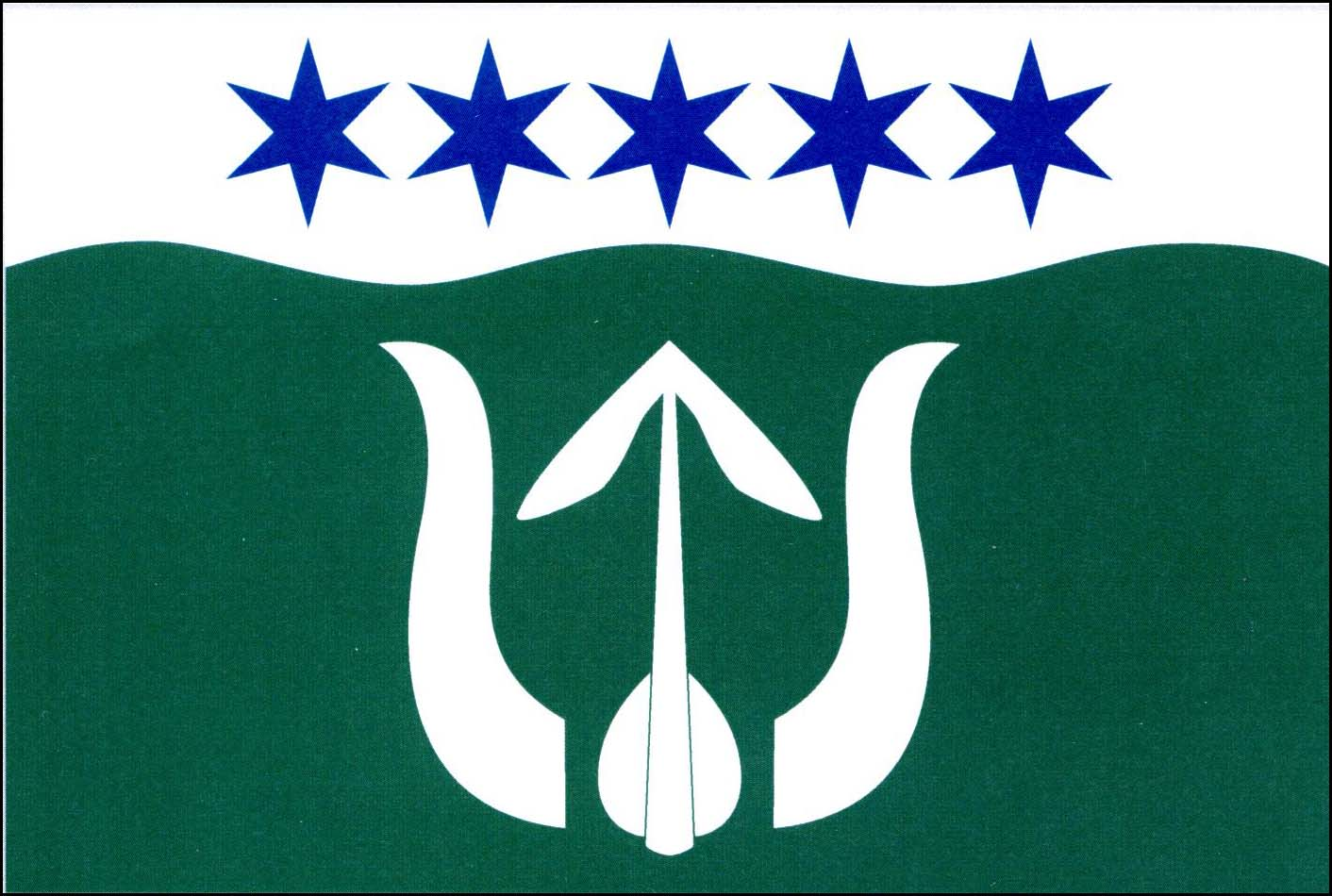
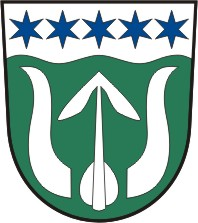
- Flag Coat of arms

- Location in the Czech Republic
- Coordinates: 48°43′33″N 14°26′37″E
- Country: Czech Republic
- Region: South Bohemian
- District: Český Krumlov
- First mentioned: 1358

Area
  - Total: 13.82 km^{2} (5.34 sq mi)
- Elevation: 675 m (2,215 ft)

Population (2026-01-01)
  - Total: 606
  - Density: 43.8/km^{2} (114/sq mi)
- Time zone: UTC+1 (CET)
  - Summer (DST): UTC+2 (CEST)
- Postal code: 382 41
- Website: www.omlenice.cz

Omlenice is a municipality and village in Český Krumlov District in the South Bohemian Region of the Czech Republic. It has about 600 inhabitants.

== Administrative division ==
Omlenice consists of five municipal parts (in brackets population according to the 2021 census):

- Omlenice (84)
- Blažkov (32)
- Omlenička (262)
- Stradov (91)
- Výnězda (83)

== Demographics ==
Historical population
Year	Pop.	±%
1869	1,066	—
1880	1,047	−1.8%
1890	999	−4.6%
1900	1,058	+5.9%
1910	1,105	+4.4%
1921	1,061	−4.0%
1930	985	−7.2%
1950	455	−53.8%
1961	505	+11.0%
1970	452	−10.5%
1980	377	−16.6%
1991	349	−7.4%
2001	413	+18.3%
2011	499	+20.8%
2021	552	+10.6%
Source: Censuses
