= Český Krumlov District =

Český Krumlov District Okres Český Krumlov
- District
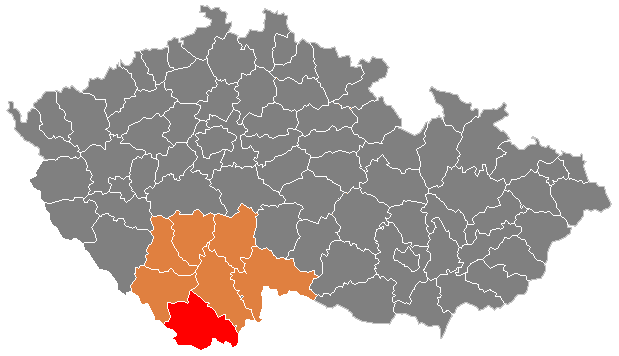
- Location in the South Bohemian Region within the Czech Republic
- Coordinates: 48°46′N 14°19′E
- Country: Czech Republic
- Region: South Bohemian
- Capital: Český Krumlov

Area
  - Total: 1,613.69 km^{2} (623.05 sq mi)

Population (2026)
  - Total: 61,584
  - Density: 38.163/km^{2} (98.843/sq mi)
- Time zone: UTC+1 (CET)
  - Summer (DST): UTC+2 (CEST)
- Municipalities: 46
- * Towns: 7
- * Market towns: 5

Český Krumlov District (Czech: okres Český Krumlov) is a district in the South Bohemian Region of the Czech Republic. Its capital is the town of Český Krumlov.

== Administrative division ==
Český Krumlov District is divided into two administrative districts of municipalities with extended competence: Český Krumlov and Kaplice.

=== List of municipalities ===
Towns are marked in bold and market towns in italics:

Benešov nad Černou – Besednice – Bohdalovice – Brloh – Bujanov – Černá v Pošumaví – Český Krumlov – Chlumec – Chvalšiny – Dolní Dvořiště – Dolní Třebonín – Frymburk – Holubov – Horní Dvořiště – Horní Planá – Hořice na Šumavě – Kájov – Kaplice – Křemže – Lipno nad Vltavou – Loučovice – Malonty – Malšín – Mirkovice – Mojné – Netřebice – Nová Ves – Omlenice – Pohorská Ves – Polná na Šumavě – Přední Výtoň – Přídolí – Přísečná – Rožmberk nad Vltavou – Rožmitál na Šumavě – Soběnov – Srnín – Střítež – Světlík – Velešín – Větřní – Věžovatá Pláně – Vyšší Brod – Zlatá Koruna – Zubčice – Zvíkov

Part of the district territory belongs to Boletice Military Training Area.

== Geography ==
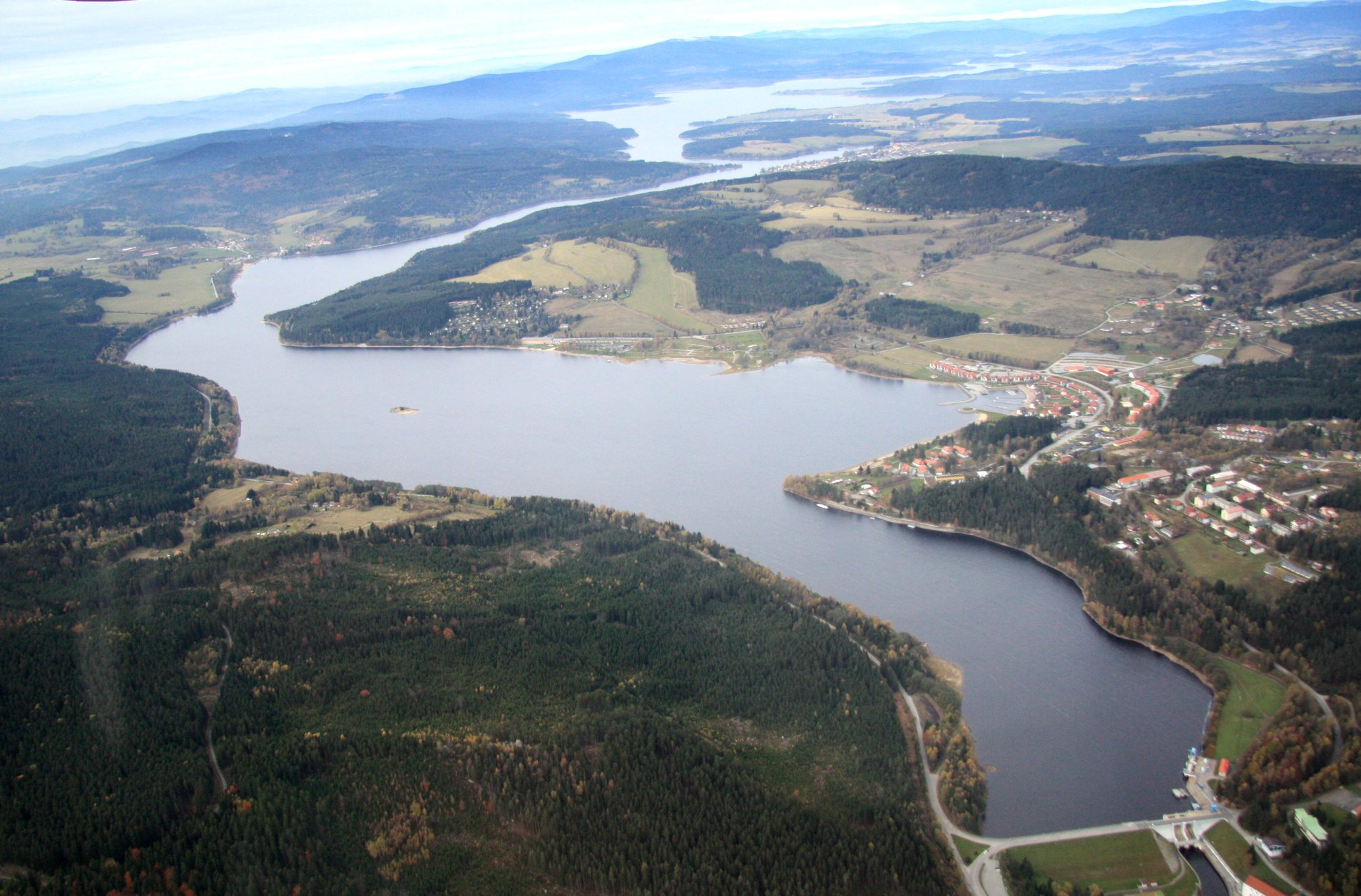
Lipno nad Vltavou and surrounding landscape

Český Krumlov District is the southernmost Czech district, bordering Austria in the south. The relief is very varied and goes from mountainous areas in the south to a relatively flat landscape in the northeast, with high average elevations. The territory extends into four geomorphological mesoregions: Bohemian Forest Foothills (most of the territory), Bohemian Forest (southwest), Gratzen Mountains (southeast) and Gratzen Foothills (a strip running from northeast to south). The highest point of the district is the mountain Smrčina in Horní Planá with an elevation of 1,333 m (4,373 ft), the lowest point is the river bed of the Vltava in Křemže at 418 m (1,371 ft).

From the total district area of 1,613.7 km^{2} (623.1 sq mi), agricultural land occupies 568.0 km^{2} (219.3 sq mi), forests occupy 788.6 km^{2} (304.5 sq mi), and water area occupies 72.6 km^{2} (28.0 sq mi). Forests cover 48.9% of the district's area.

The most important river is the Vltava, which flows from west to southeast and then turns north. The eastern part of the territory is drained by the Malše, a tributary of the Vltava. Although there are not many bodies of water here, the Lipno Reservoir is built on the Vltava, which is the largest body of water in the Czech Republic.

The west of the territory is protected within the Šumava Protected Landscape Area, the easternmost edge of the Šumava National Park also reaches here in a small part. In the north there is the Blanský Les Protected Landscape Area.

== Demographics ==
Historical population

| Year | Pop. | ±% |
|---|---|---|
| 1869 | 89,046 | — |
| 1880 | 92,992 | +4.4% |
| 1890 | 93,055 | +0.1% |
| 1900 | 94,818 | +1.9% |
| 1910 | 96,471 | +1.7% |

| Year | Pop. | ±% |
|---|---|---|
| 1921 | 93,377 | −3.2% |
| 1930 | 94,377 | +1.1% |
| 1950 | 46,814 | −50.4% |
| 1961 | 48,620 | +3.9% |
| 1970 | 49,940 | +2.7% |

| Year | Pop. | ±% |
|---|---|---|
| 1980 | 55,395 | +10.9% |
| 1991 | 57,388 | +3.6% |
| 2001 | 59,551 | +3.8% |
| 2011 | 60,498 | +1.6% |
| 2021 | 59,118 | −2.3% |

Source: Censuses

=== Most populous municipalities ===
| Name | Population | Area (km^{2}) |
|---|---|---|
| Český Krumlov | 12,658 | 22 |
| Kaplice | 7,547 | 41 |
| Velešín | 3,846 | 13 |
| Větřní | 3,753 | 28 |
| Křemže | 3,012 | 38 |
| Vyšší Brod | 2,649 | 70 |
| Kájov | 1,971 | 50 |
| Horní Planá | 1,933 | 127 |
| Loučovice | 1,469 | 42 |
| Malonty | 1,456 | 61 |

== Economy ==
The largest employers with headquarters in Český Krumlov District and at least 500 employees are:

| Economic entity | Location | Number of employees | Main activity |
|---|---|---|---|
| Engel strojírenská | Kaplice | 1,000–1,499 | Manufacture of machines for processing plastics |
| Český Krumlov Hospital | Český Krumlov | 500–999 | Health care |
| Linde Pohony | Český Krumlov | 500–999 | Manufacture of power units |
| Schwan Cosmetics CR | Český Krumlov | 500–999 | Manufacture of cosmetics |

== Transport ==
There are no motorways in the district. The most important road is the I/3 road, which leads from České Budějovice to the border with Austria and is part of the European route E55.

== Sights ==
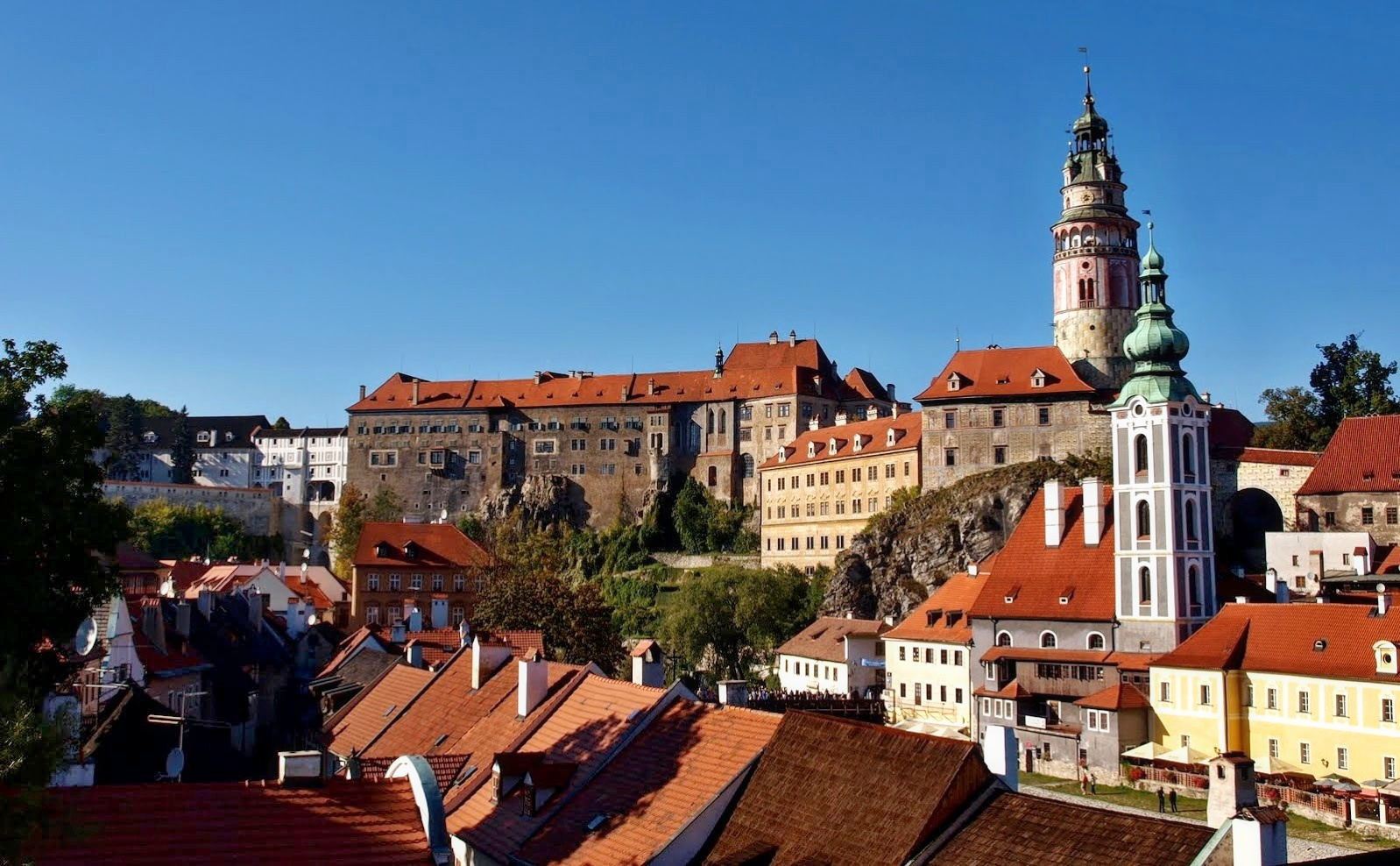
Český Krumlov Castle

The historic centre of Český Krumlov was designated a UNESCO World Heritage Site in 1992 because of its well-preserved Gothic, Renaissance and Baroque architecture.

The most important monuments in the district, protected as national cultural monuments, are:

- Český Krumlov Castle
- Church of Saint Vitus in Český Krumlov
- Church of the Assumption of the Virgin Mary in Kájov
- Vyšší Brod Monastery
- Zlatá Koruna Monastery
- Rožmberk Castle
- Baroque theatre in Český Krumlov Castle
- Homestead No. 3 in Krnín
- Záviš's Cross in Vyšší Brod
- Schwarzenberg Canal (partly)

The best-preserved settlements and localities, protected as monument reservations and monument zones, are:

- Český Krumlov (monument reservation)
- Archaeological site in Třísov (monument reservation)
- Benešov nad Černou
- Český Krumlov-Plešivec
- Chvalšiny
- Hořice na Šumavě
- Kaplice
- Rožmberk nad Vltavou
- Vyšší Brod
- Čertyně
- Krnín
- Mirkovice
- Pernek
- Rojšín
- Zlatá Koruna

The most visited tourist destinations are the Treetop Walkway in Lipno nad Vltavou, and Český Krumlov Castle.
