= Zubčice =

- Municipality
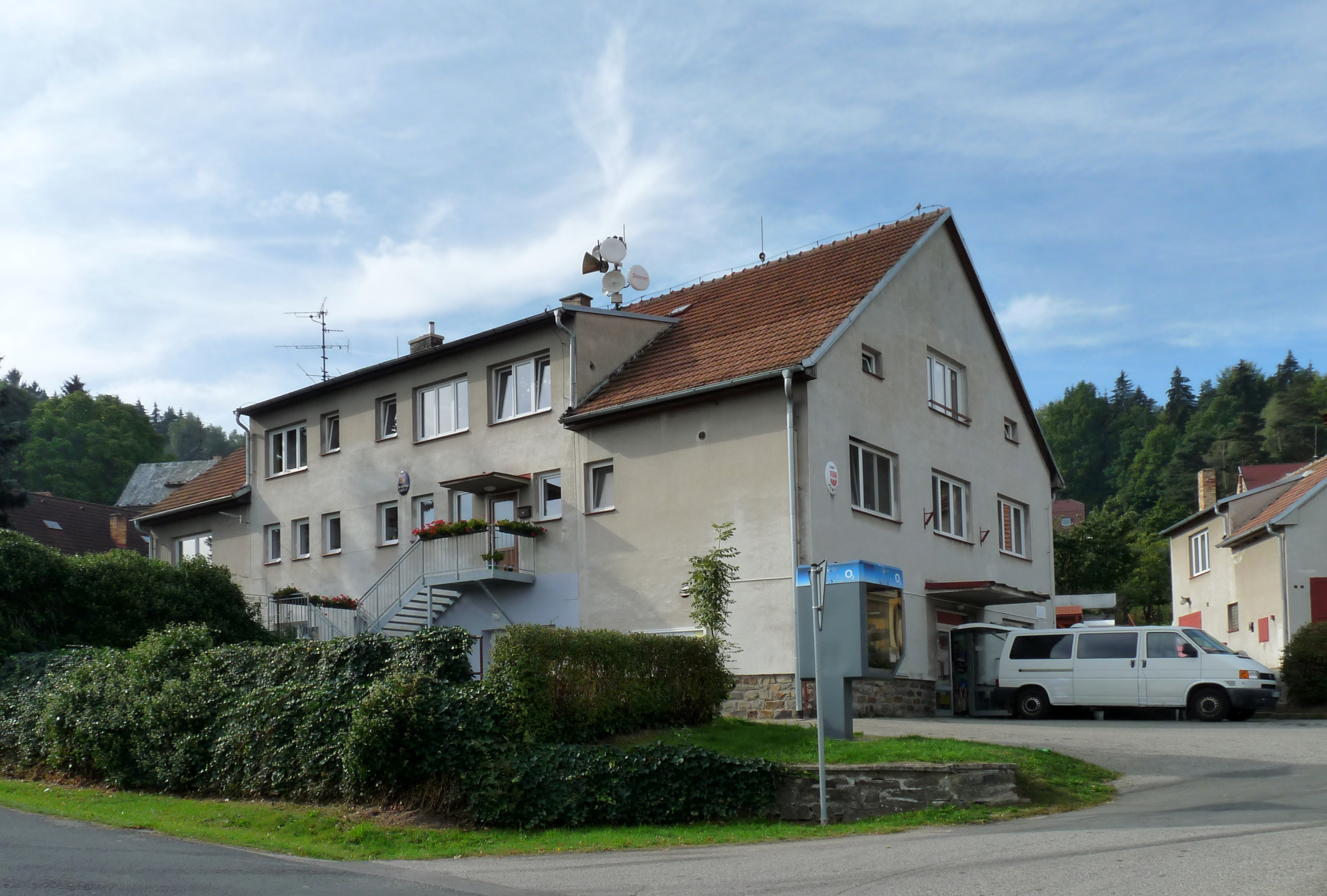
- Municipal office

- Flag Coat of arms

- Location in the Czech Republic
- Coordinates: 48°47′39″N 14°24′26″E
- Country: Czech Republic
- Region: South Bohemian
- District: Český Krumlov
- First mentioned: 1358

Area
  - Total: 9.49 km^{2} (3.66 sq mi)
- Elevation: 620 m (2,030 ft)

Population (2026-01-01)
  - Total: 428
  - Density: 45.1/km^{2} (117/sq mi)
- Time zone: UTC+1 (CET)
  - Summer (DST): UTC+2 (CEST)
- Postal code: 382 32
- Website: www.zubcice.cz

Zubčice is a municipality and village in Český Krumlov District in the South Bohemian Region of the Czech Republic. It has about 400 inhabitants.

== Administrative division ==
Zubčice consists of three municipal parts (in brackets population according to the 2021 census):

- Zubčice (288)
- Markvartice (72)
- Zubčická Lhotka (64)

== Demographics ==
Historical population
Year	Pop.	±%
1869	570	—
1880	682	+19.6%
1890	646	−5.3%
1900	658	+1.9%
1910	676	+2.7%
1921	663	−1.9%
1930	648	−2.3%
1950	462	−28.7%
1961	382	−17.3%
1970	380	−0.5%
1980	389	+2.4%
1991	340	−12.6%
2001	375	+10.3%
2011	390	+4.0%
2021	424	+8.7%
Source: Censuses
