= Mojné =

- Municipality
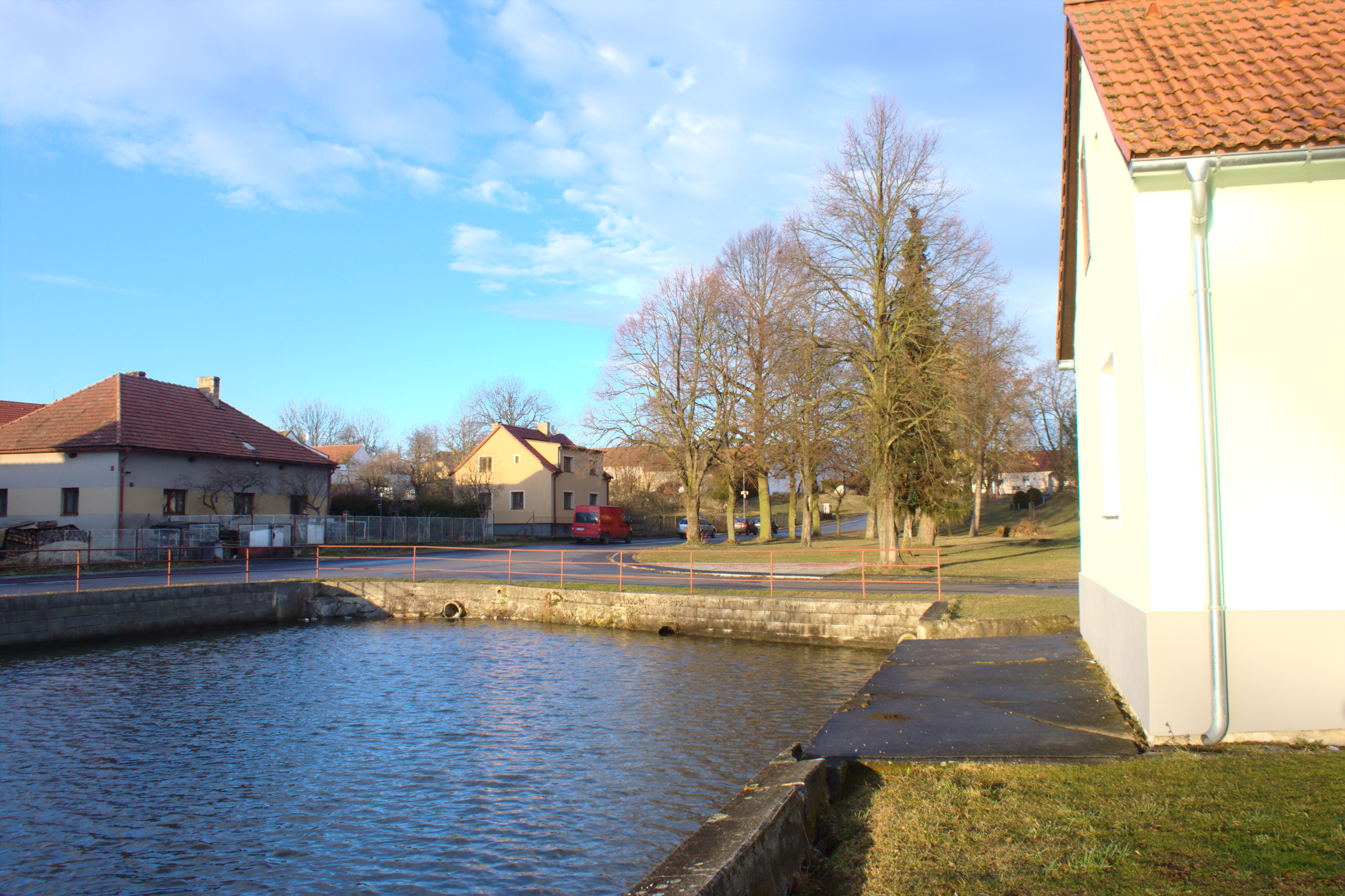
- Centre of Mojné

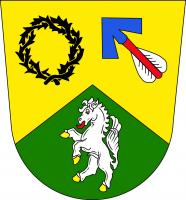
- Flag Coat of arms

- Location in the Czech Republic
- Coordinates: 48°50′5″N 14°24′26″E
- Country: Czech Republic
- Region: South Bohemian
- District: Český Krumlov
- First mentioned: 1315

Area
  - Total: 8.51 km^{2} (3.29 sq mi)
- Elevation: 550 m (1,800 ft)

Population (2026-01-01)
  - Total: 300
  - Density: 35/km^{2} (91/sq mi)
- Time zone: UTC+1 (CET)
  - Summer (DST): UTC+2 (CEST)
- Postal code: 382 32
- Website: www.mojne.cz

Mojné is a municipality and village in Český Krumlov District in the South Bohemian Region of the Czech Republic. It has about 300 inhabitants.

Mojné lies approximately 8 kilometres (5 mi) east of Český Krumlov, 17 km (11 mi) south of České Budějovice, and 140 km (87 mi) south of Prague.

== Administrative division ==
Mojné consists of three municipal parts (in brackets population according to the 2021 census):

- Mojné (219)
- Černice (55)
- Záhorkovice (11)

== Demographics ==
Historical population
Year	Pop.	±%
1869	525	—
1880	540	+2.9%
1890	491	−9.1%
1900	475	−3.3%
1910	450	−5.3%
1921	455	+1.1%
1930	466	+2.4%
1950	308	−33.9%
1961	288	−6.5%
1970	246	−14.6%
1980	272	+10.6%
1991	209	−23.2%
2001	199	−4.8%
2011	231	+16.1%
2021	285	+23.4%
Source: Censuses
