= Soběnov =

- Municipality
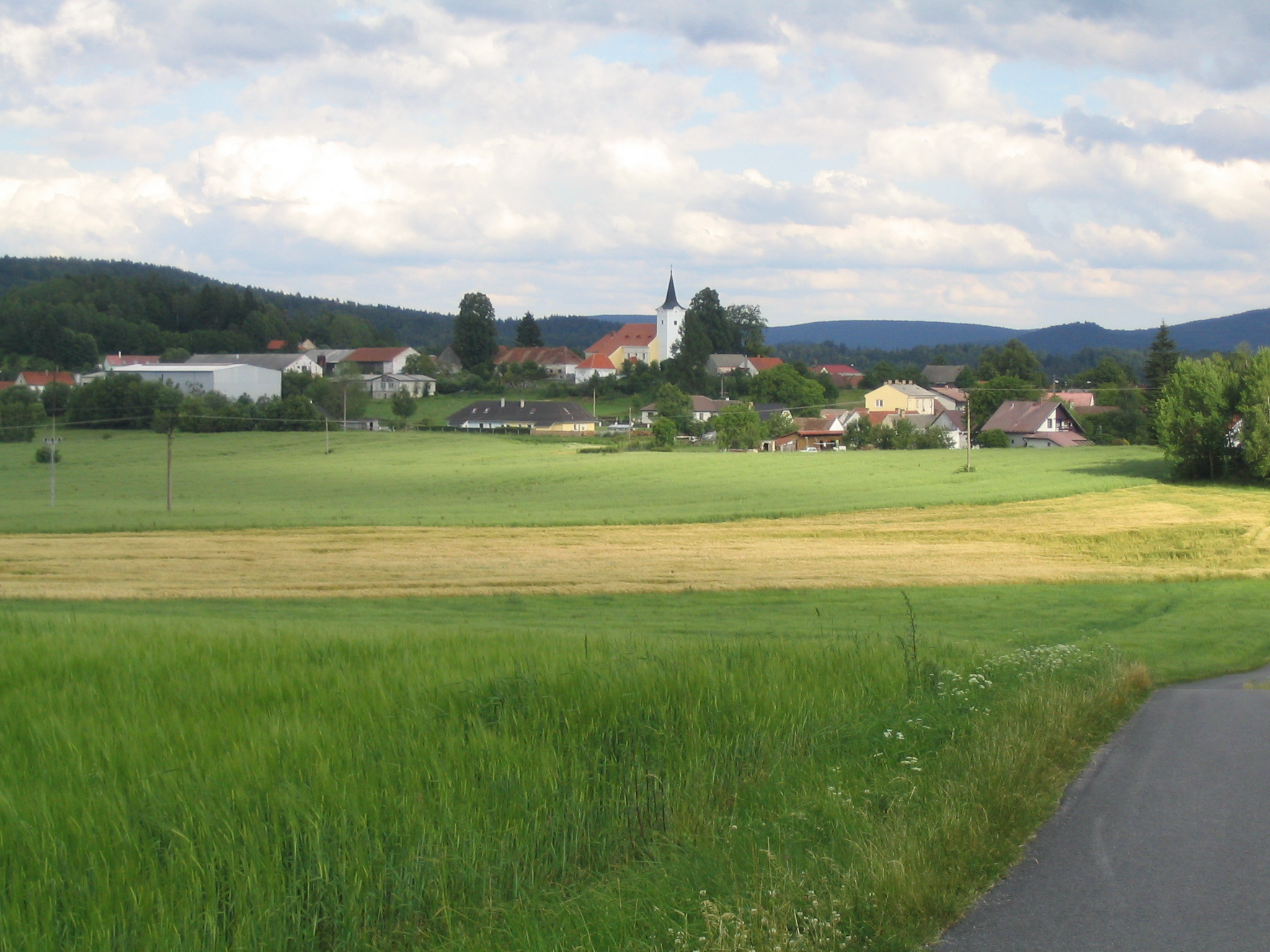
- View from the northwest

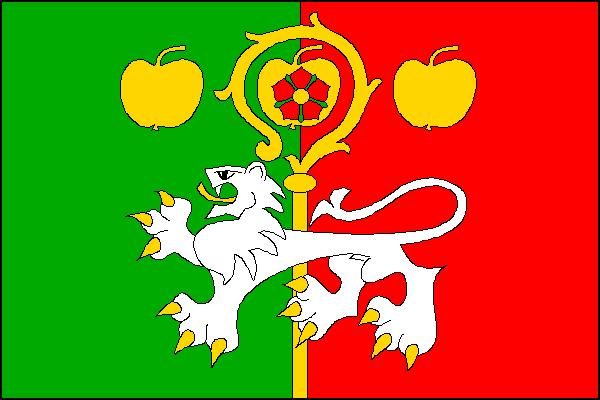
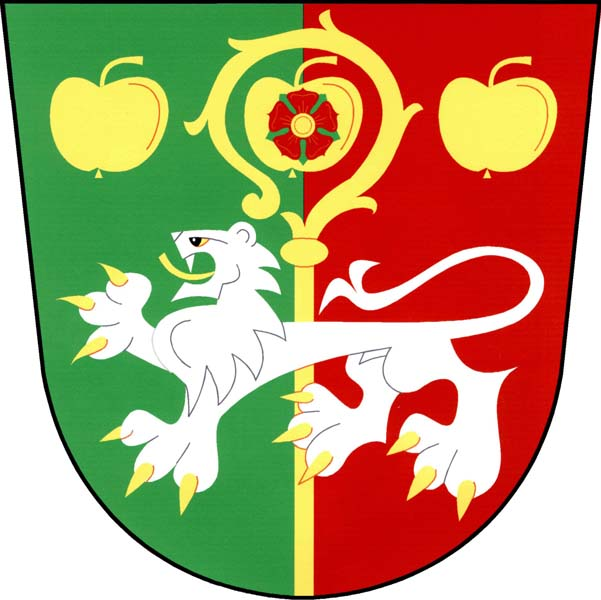
- Flag Coat of arms

- Location in the Czech Republic
- Coordinates: 48°45′46″N 14°32′45″E
- Country: Czech Republic
- Region: South Bohemian
- District: Český Krumlov
- First mentioned: 1359

Area
  - Total: 12.47 km^{2} (4.81 sq mi)
- Elevation: 630 m (2,070 ft)

Population (2026-01-01)
  - Total: 371
  - Density: 29.8/km^{2} (77.1/sq mi)
- Time zone: UTC+1 (CET)
  - Summer (DST): UTC+2 (CEST)
- Postal code: 382 41
- Website: www.sobenov.cz

Soběnov is a municipality and village in Český Krumlov District in the South Bohemian Region of the Czech Republic. It has about 400 inhabitants.

Soběnov lies approximately 18 kilometres (11 mi) east of Český Krumlov, 25 km (16 mi) south of České Budějovice, and 148 km (92 mi) south of Prague.

== Administrative division ==
Soběnov consists of three municipal parts (in brackets population according to the 2021 census):

- Soběnov (315)
- Přísečno (4)
- Smrhov (39)

== Demographics ==
Historical population
Year	Pop.	±%
1869	672	—
1880	745	+10.9%
1890	737	−1.1%
1900	725	−1.6%
1910	795	+9.7%
1921	740	−6.9%
1930	662	−10.5%
1950	421	−36.4%
1961	431	+2.4%
1970	405	−6.0%
1980	331	−18.3%
1991	273	−17.5%
2001	302	+10.6%
2011	350	+15.9%
2021	358	+2.3%
Source: Censuses
