= Srnín =

- Municipality
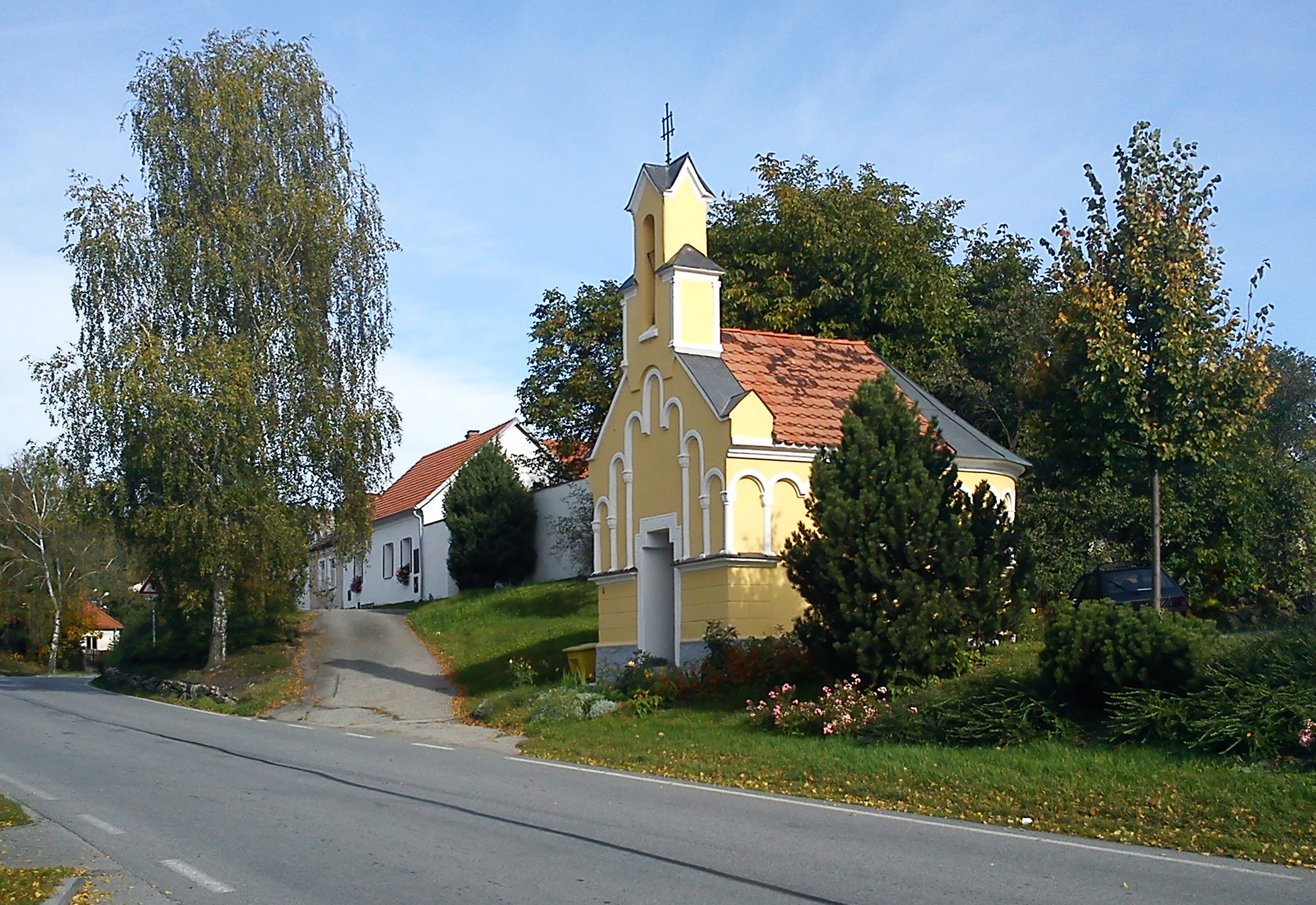
- Chapel by the main road

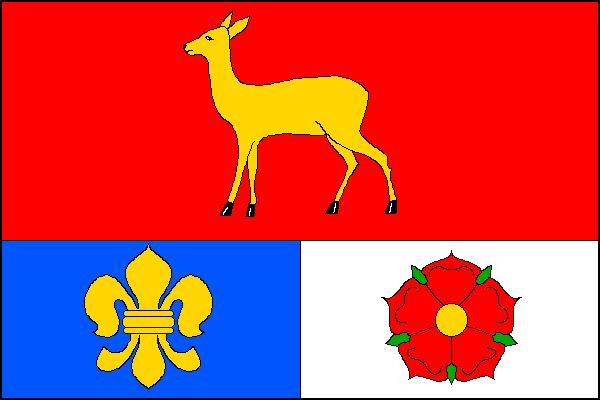
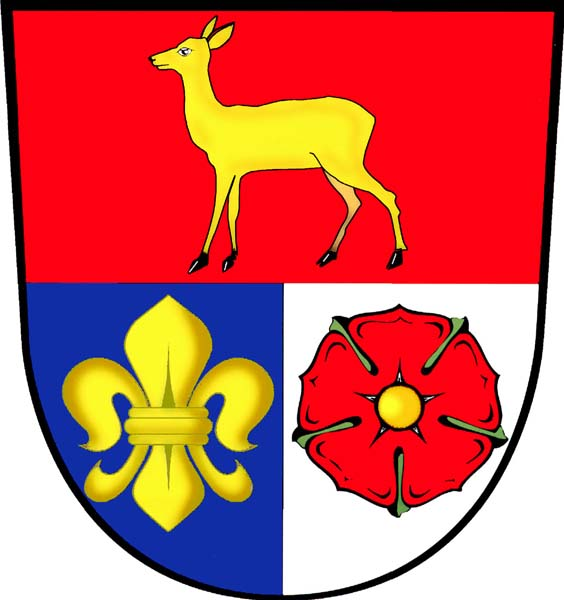
- Flag Coat of arms

- Location in the Czech Republic
- Coordinates: 48°50′42″N 14°20′37″E
- Country: Czech Republic
- Region: South Bohemian
- District: Český Krumlov
- First mentioned: 1400

Area
  - Total: 6.72 km^{2} (2.59 sq mi)
- Elevation: 540 m (1,770 ft)

Population (2026-01-01)
  - Total: 382
  - Density: 56.8/km^{2} (147/sq mi)
- Time zone: UTC+1 (CET)
  - Summer (DST): UTC+2 (CEST)
- Postal code: 381 01
- Website: www.obecsrnin.cz

Srnín is a municipality and village in Český Krumlov District in the South Bohemian Region of the Czech Republic. It has about 400 inhabitants.

Srnín lies approximately 5 kilometres (3 mi) north of Český Krumlov, 18 km (11 mi) south-west of České Budějovice, and 138 km (86 mi) south of Prague.

== Demographics ==
Historical population
Year	Pop.	±%
1869	209	—
1880	227	+8.6%
1890	245	+7.9%
1900	273	+11.4%
1910	265	−2.9%
1921	273	+3.0%
1930	269	−1.5%
1950	222	−17.5%
1961	222	+0.0%
1970	212	−4.5%
1980	207	−2.4%
1991	192	−7.2%
2001	224	+16.7%
2011	311	+38.8%
2021	323	+3.9%
Source: Censuses
