= Světlík =

- Municipality
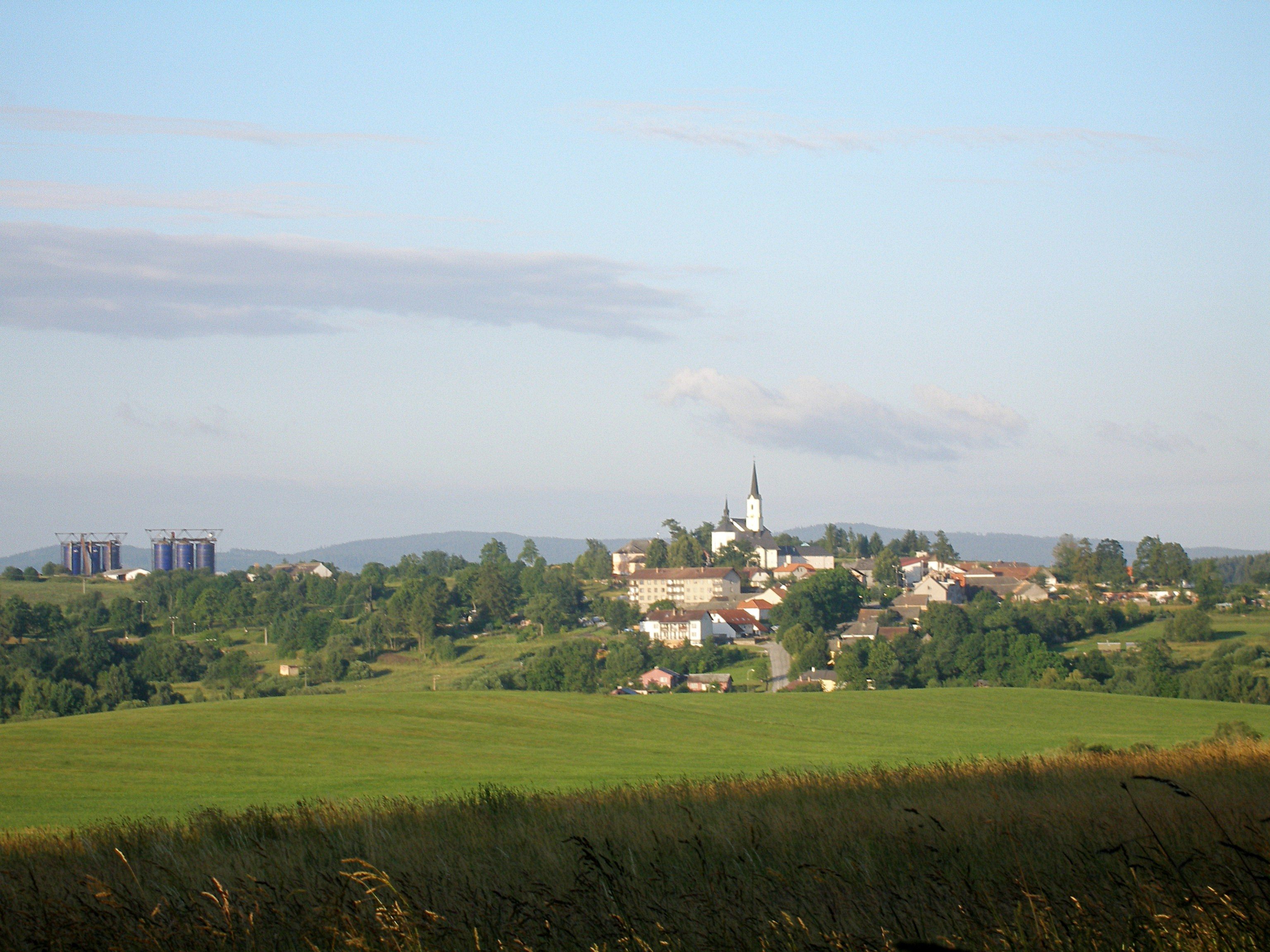
- View from the northeast

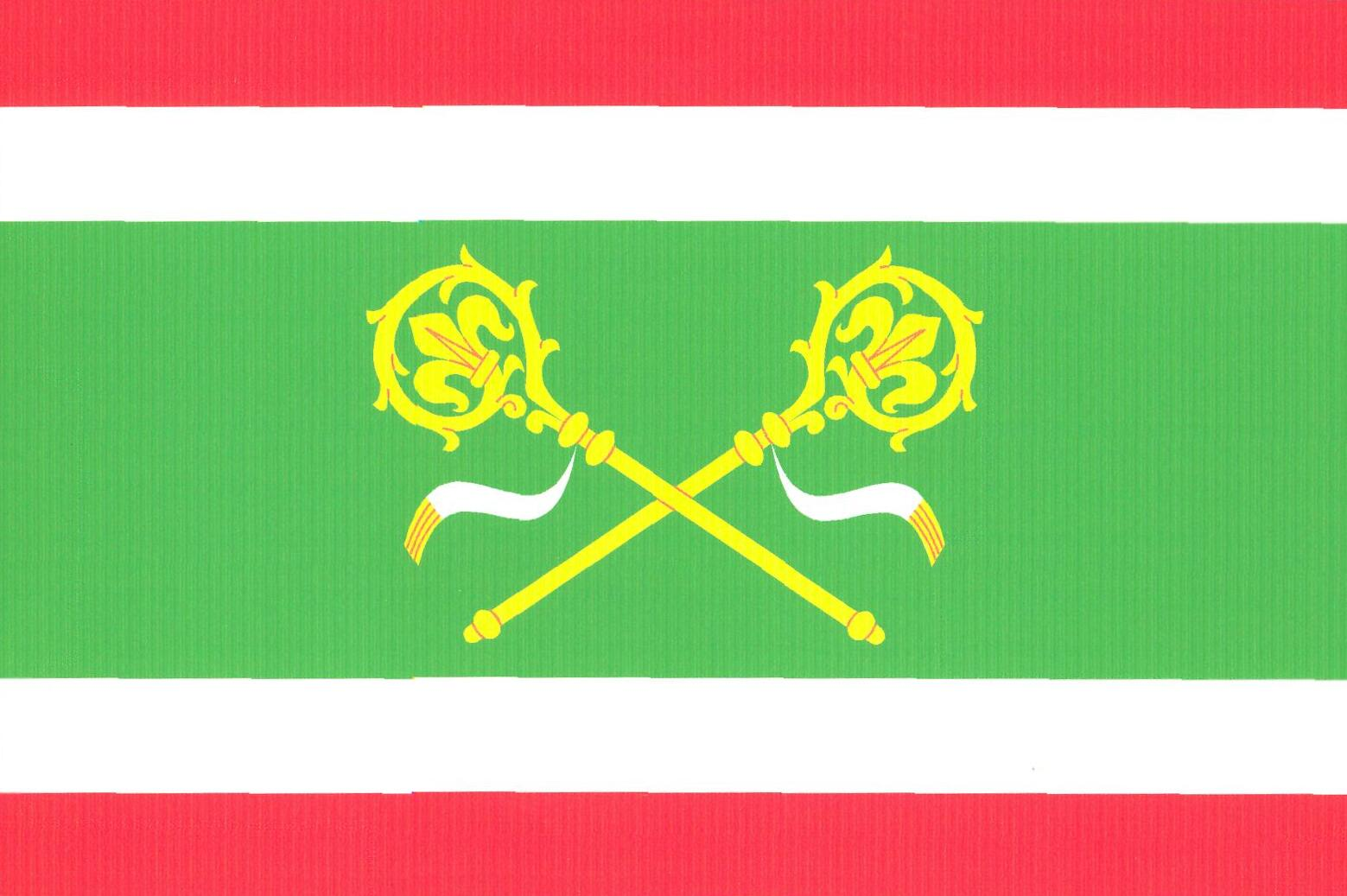
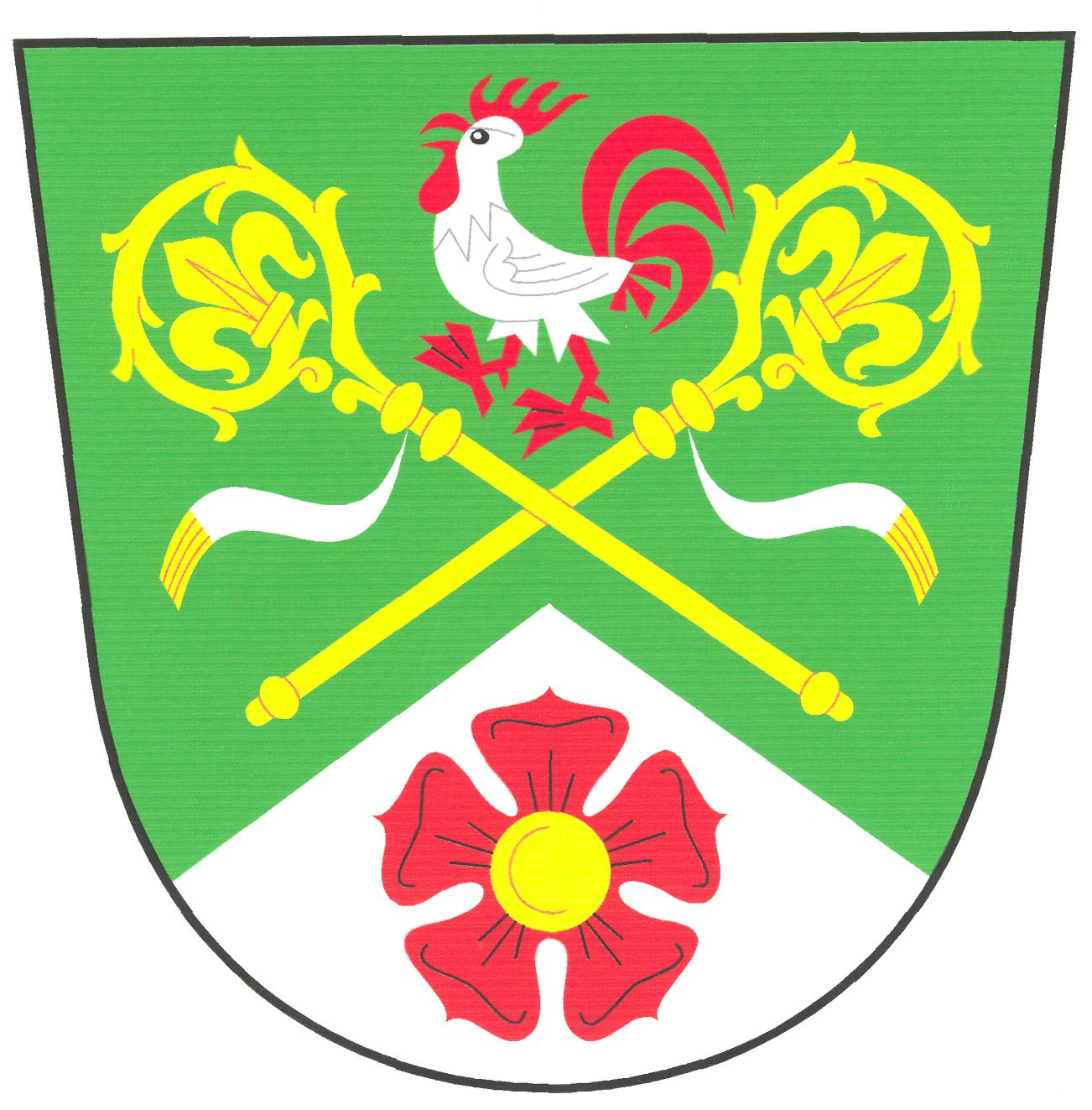
- Flag Coat of arms

- Location in the Czech Republic
- Coordinates: 48°43′54″N 14°12′39″E
- Country: Czech Republic
- Region: South Bohemian
- District: Český Krumlov
- First mentioned: 1258

Area
  - Total: 26.81 km^{2} (10.35 sq mi)
- Elevation: 776 m (2,546 ft)

Population (2026-01-01)
  - Total: 236
  - Density: 8.80/km^{2} (22.8/sq mi)
- Time zone: UTC+1 (CET)
  - Summer (DST): UTC+2 (CEST)
- Postal code: 382 16
- Website: www.obecsvetlik.cz

Světlík (German: Kirchschlag) is a municipality and village in Český Krumlov District in the South Bohemian Region of the Czech Republic. It has about 200 inhabitants.

== Etymology ==
The name is derived from the Czech adjective světlý ('bright') and referred to a bright forest.

== Geography ==
Světlík is located about 11 kilometres (7 mi) southwest of Český Krumlov and 32 km (20 mi) southwest of České Budějovice. It lies in the Bohemian Forest Foothills. The highest point is a hill at 855 m (2,805 ft) above sea level. The stream Strážný potok originates here and flows across the municipality.

== History ==
The first written mention of Světlík is from 1258. From 1624 until the establishment of an independent municipality in 1850, it was part of the Český Krumlov estate.

== Demographics ==
Historical population

Year	Pop.	±%
1869	1,416	—
1880	1,461	+3.2%
1890	1,395	−4.5%
1900	1,398	+0.2%
1910	1,406	+0.6%

Year	Pop.	±%
1921	1,422	+1.1%
1930	1,523	+7.1%
1950	323	−78.8%
1961	273	−15.5%
1970	245	−10.3%

Year	Pop.	±%
1980	249	+1.6%
1991	228	−8.4%
2001	263	+15.4%
2011	206	−21.7%
2021	229	+11.2%

Source: Censuses

== Transport ==
There are no railways or major roads passing through the municipality.

== Sights ==
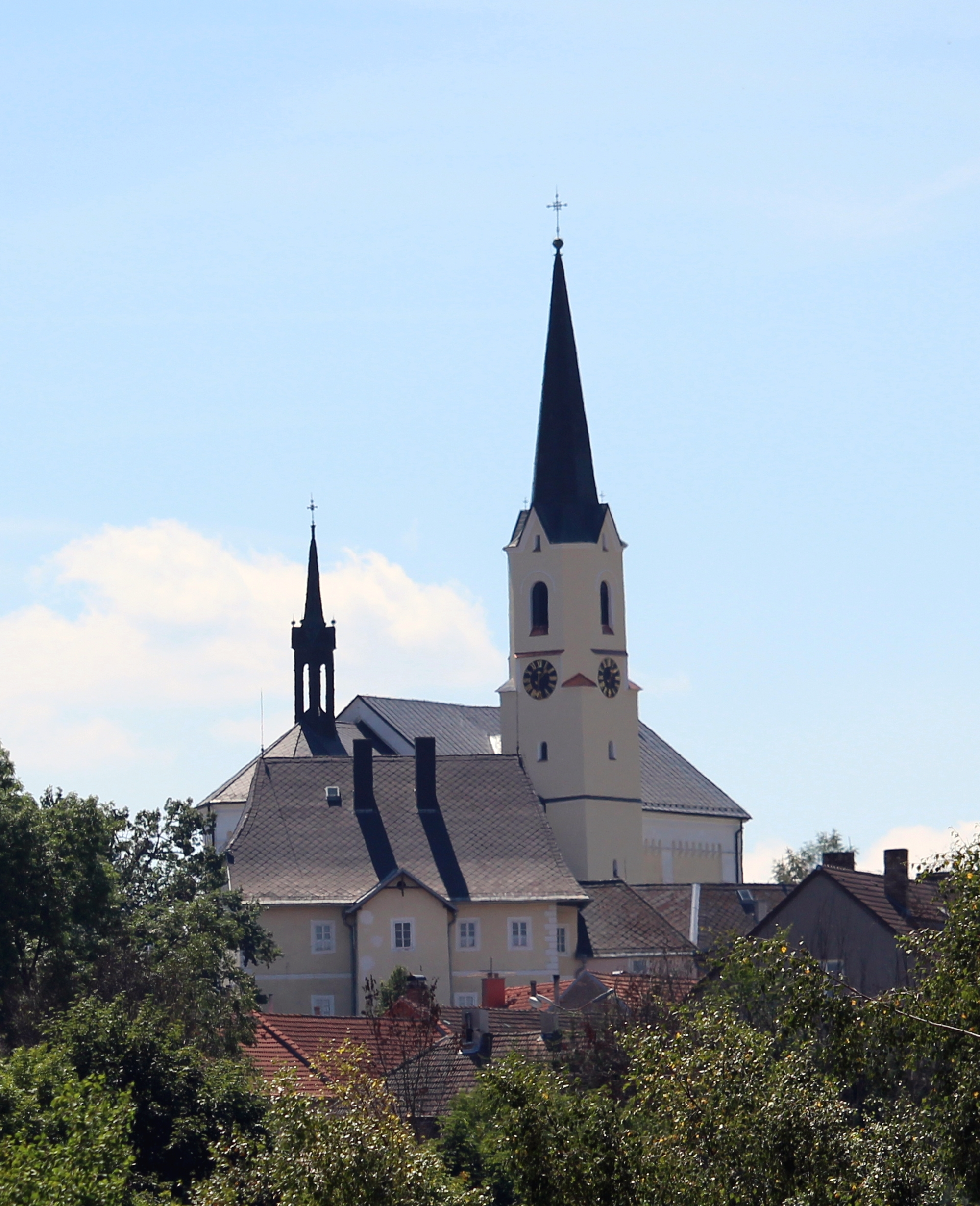
Church of Saint James the Great

The main landmark of Světlík is the Church of Saint James the Great. It was built in the mid-13th century, but its current appearance is a result of pseudo-Romanesque reconstruction in 1872–1874. The building of the rectory next to the church dates from the 18th century.

The ruins of the Pasovary Fortress are located in the northeastern part of the municipality. The fortress was founded in the 13th century. Only the torso of the masonry and the tower from the 14th century have survived.
