= Malonty =

- Municipality
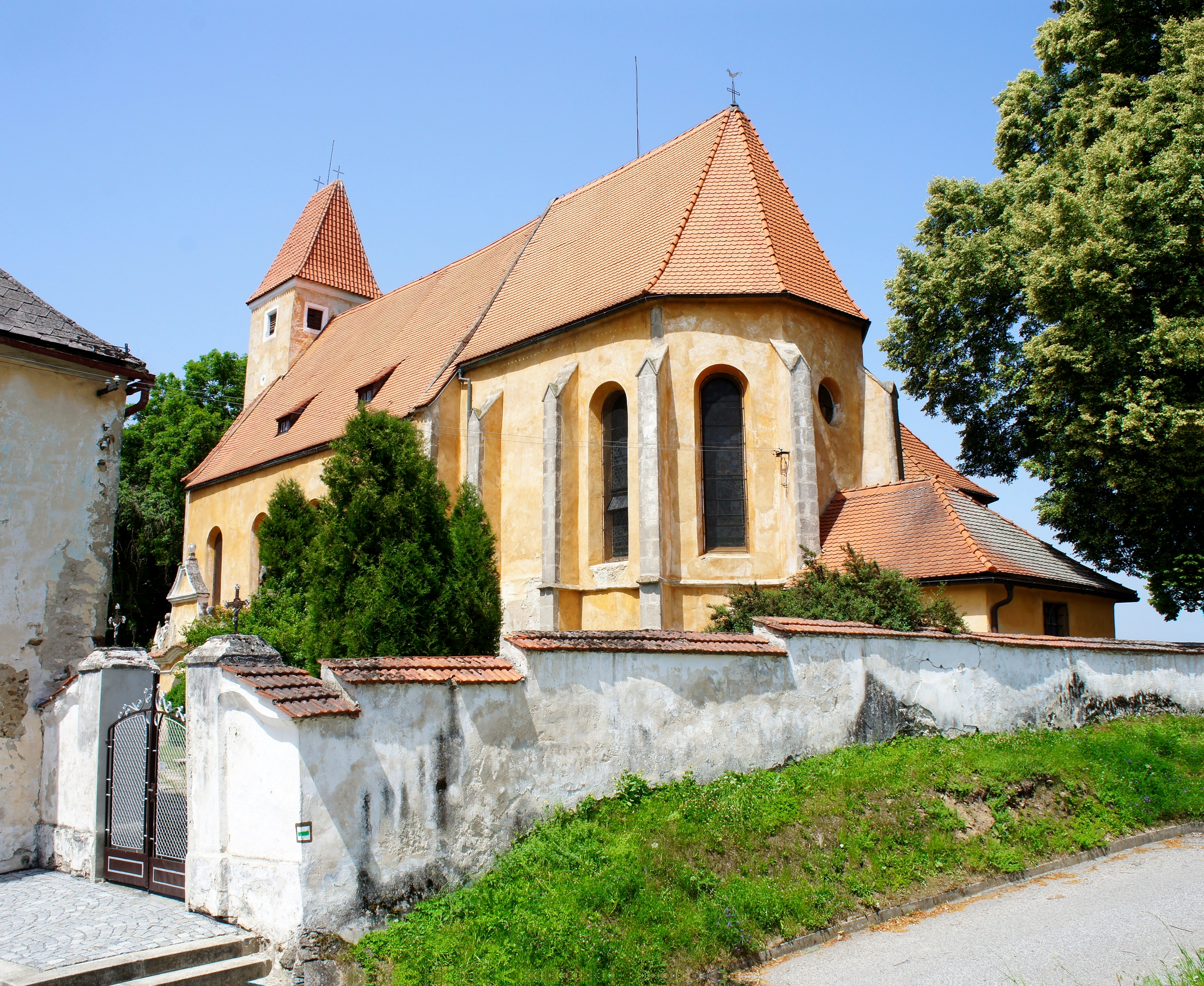
- Church of Saint Bartholomew

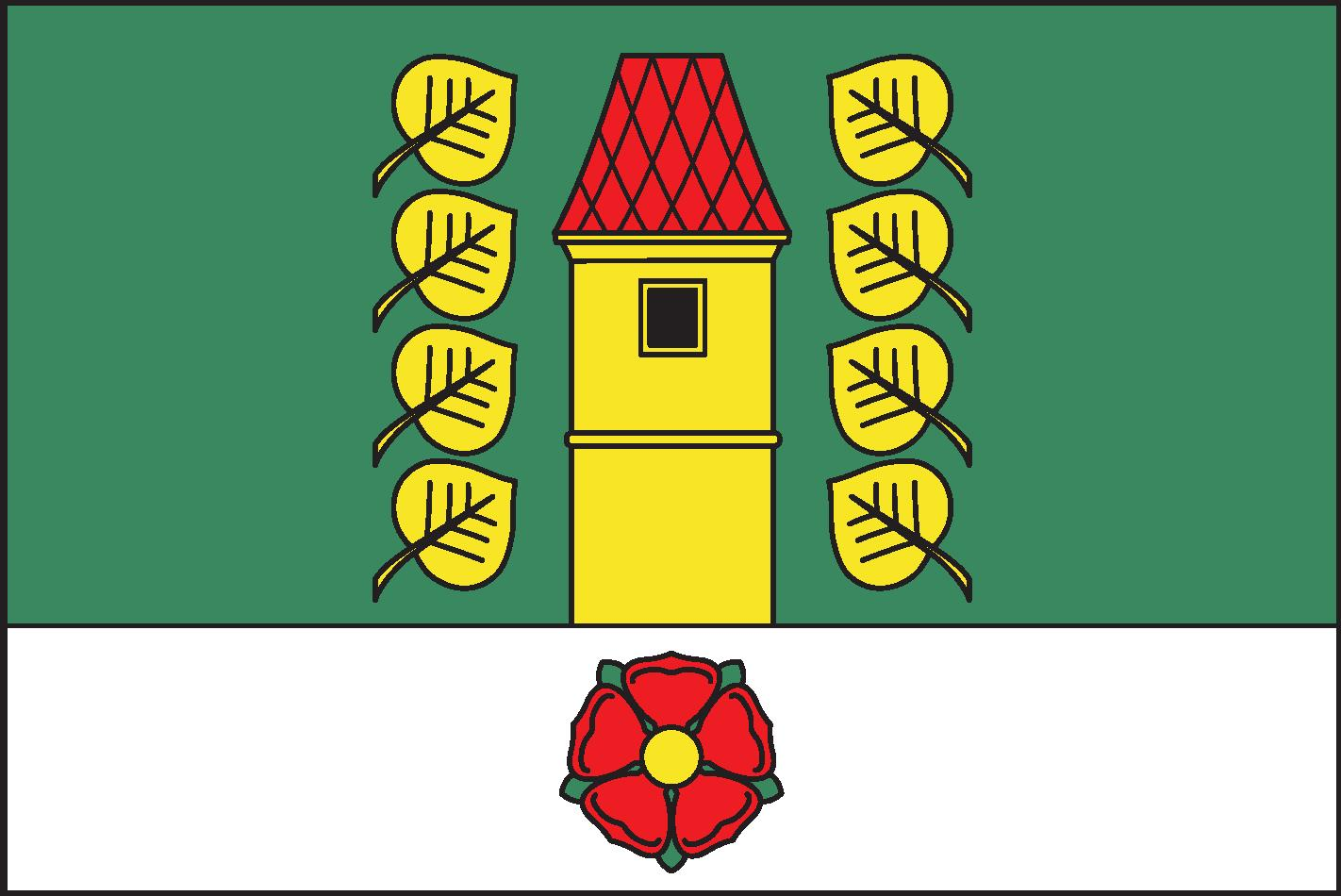
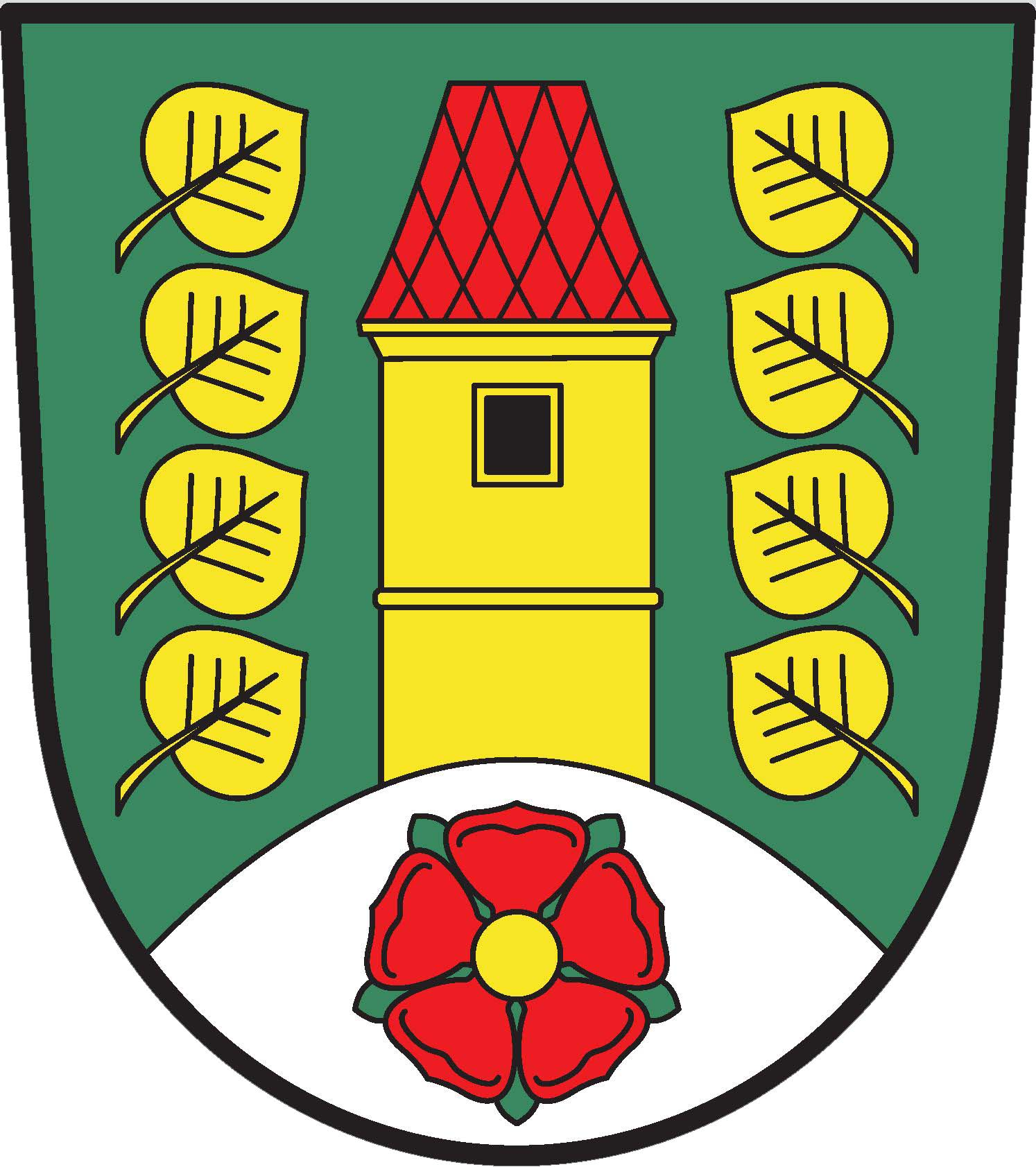
- Flag Coat of arms

- Location in the Czech Republic
- Coordinates: 48°41′10″N 14°34′36″E
- Country: Czech Republic
- Region: South Bohemian
- District: Český Krumlov
- First mentioned: 1360

Area
  - Total: 61.31 km^{2} (23.67 sq mi)
- Elevation: 681 m (2,234 ft)

Population (2026-01-01)
  - Total: 1,456
  - Density: 23.75/km^{2} (61.51/sq mi)
- Time zone: UTC+1 (CET)
  - Summer (DST): UTC+2 (CEST)
- Postal codes: 382 41, 382 91
- Website: www.obecmalonty.cz

Malonty (German: Meinetschlag) is a municipality and village in Český Krumlov District in the South Bohemian Region of the Czech Republic. It has about 1,500 inhabitants.

Malonty lies approximately 24 kilometres (15 mi) south-east of Český Krumlov, 34 km (21 mi) south of České Budějovice, and 157 km (98 mi) south of Prague.

== Administrative division ==
Malonty consists of eight municipal parts (in brackets population according to the 2021 census):

- Malonty (1,014)
- Bělá (72)
- Bukovsko (39)
- Desky (46)
- Jaroměř (48)
- Meziříčí (114)
- Radčice (14)
- Rapotice (3)

== Demographics ==
Historical population
Year	Pop.	±%
1869	3,526	—
1880	3,385	−4.0%
1890	3,267	−3.5%
1900	3,251	−0.5%
1910	3,363	+3.4%
1921	3,105	−7.7%
1930	2,594	−16.5%
1950	874	−66.3%
1961	1,064	+21.7%
1970	1,073	+0.8%
1980	1,027	−4.3%
1991	1,008	−1.9%
2001	1,089	+8.0%
2011	1,271	+16.7%
2021	1,350	+6.2%
Source: Censuses
