= Netřebice (Český Krumlov District) =

- Municipality
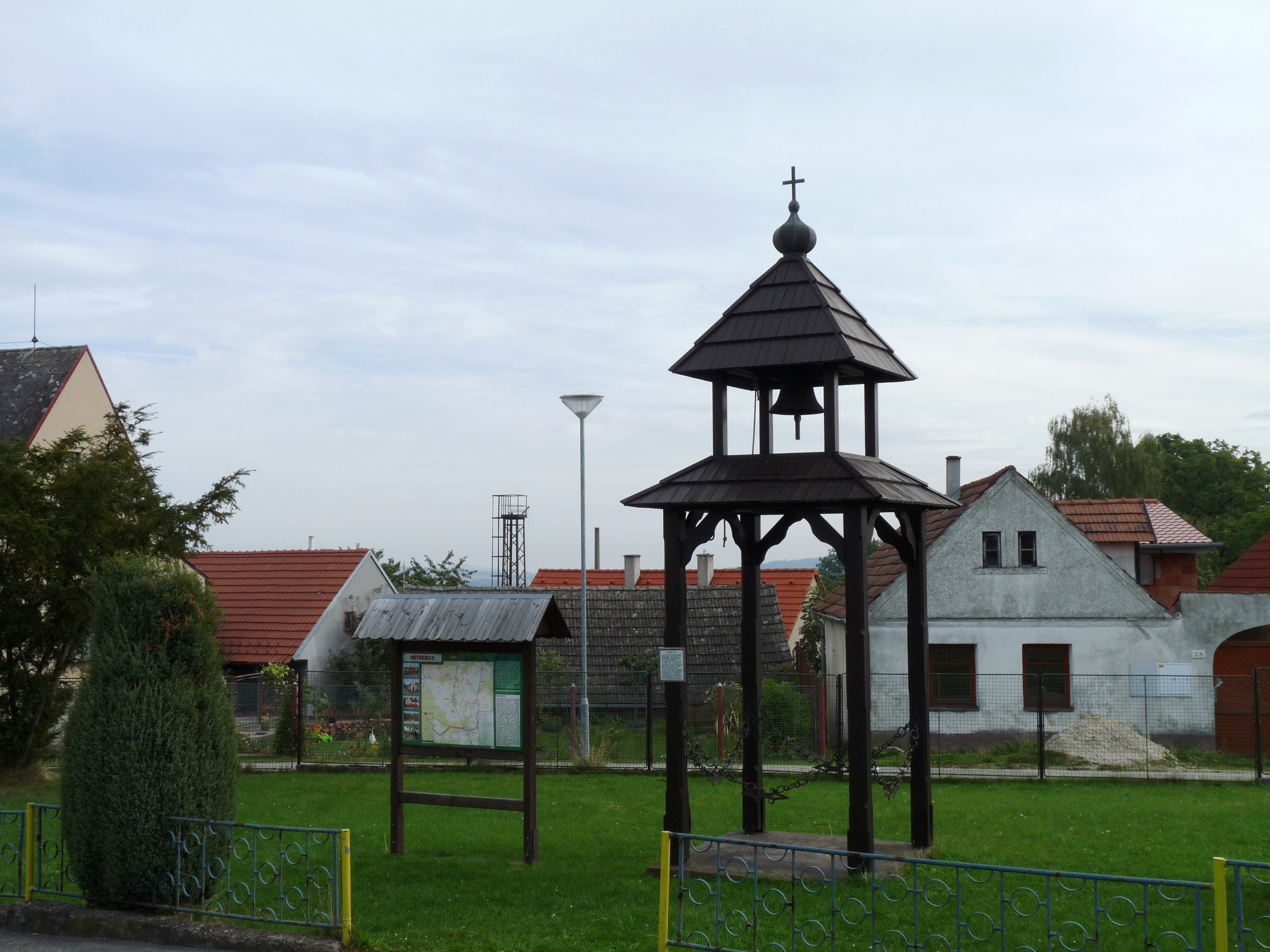
- Belfry in the centre of Netřebice

- Flag Coat of arms

- Location in the Czech Republic
- Coordinates: 48°47′27″N 14°27′20″E
- Country: Czech Republic
- Region: South Bohemian
- District: Český Krumlov
- First mentioned: 1358

Area
  - Total: 13.36 km^{2} (5.16 sq mi)
- Elevation: 635 m (2,083 ft)

Population (2026-01-01)
  - Total: 461
  - Density: 34.5/km^{2} (89.4/sq mi)
- Time zone: UTC+1 (CET)
  - Summer (DST): UTC+2 (CEST)
- Postal code: 382 32
- Website: www.obecnetrebice.cz

Netřebice is a municipality and village in Český Krumlov District in the South Bohemian Region of the Czech Republic. It has about 500 inhabitants.

Netřebice lies approximately 11 kilometres (7 mi) east of Český Krumlov, 21 km (13 mi) south of České Budějovice, and 144 km (89 mi) south of Prague.

== Administrative division ==
Netřebice consists of three municipal parts (in brackets population according to the 2021 census):

- Netřebice (382)
- Dlouhá (25)
- Výheň (47)

== Demographics ==
Historical population
Year	Pop.	±%
1869	738	—
1880	774	+4.9%
1890	833	+7.6%
1900	842	+1.1%
1910	831	−1.3%
1921	862	+3.7%
1930	745	−13.6%
1950	654	−12.2%
1961	630	−3.7%
1970	473	−24.9%
1980	477	+0.8%
1991	431	−9.6%
2001	440	+2.1%
2011	452	+2.7%
2021	454	+0.4%
Source: Censuses
