= Malšín =

- Municipality
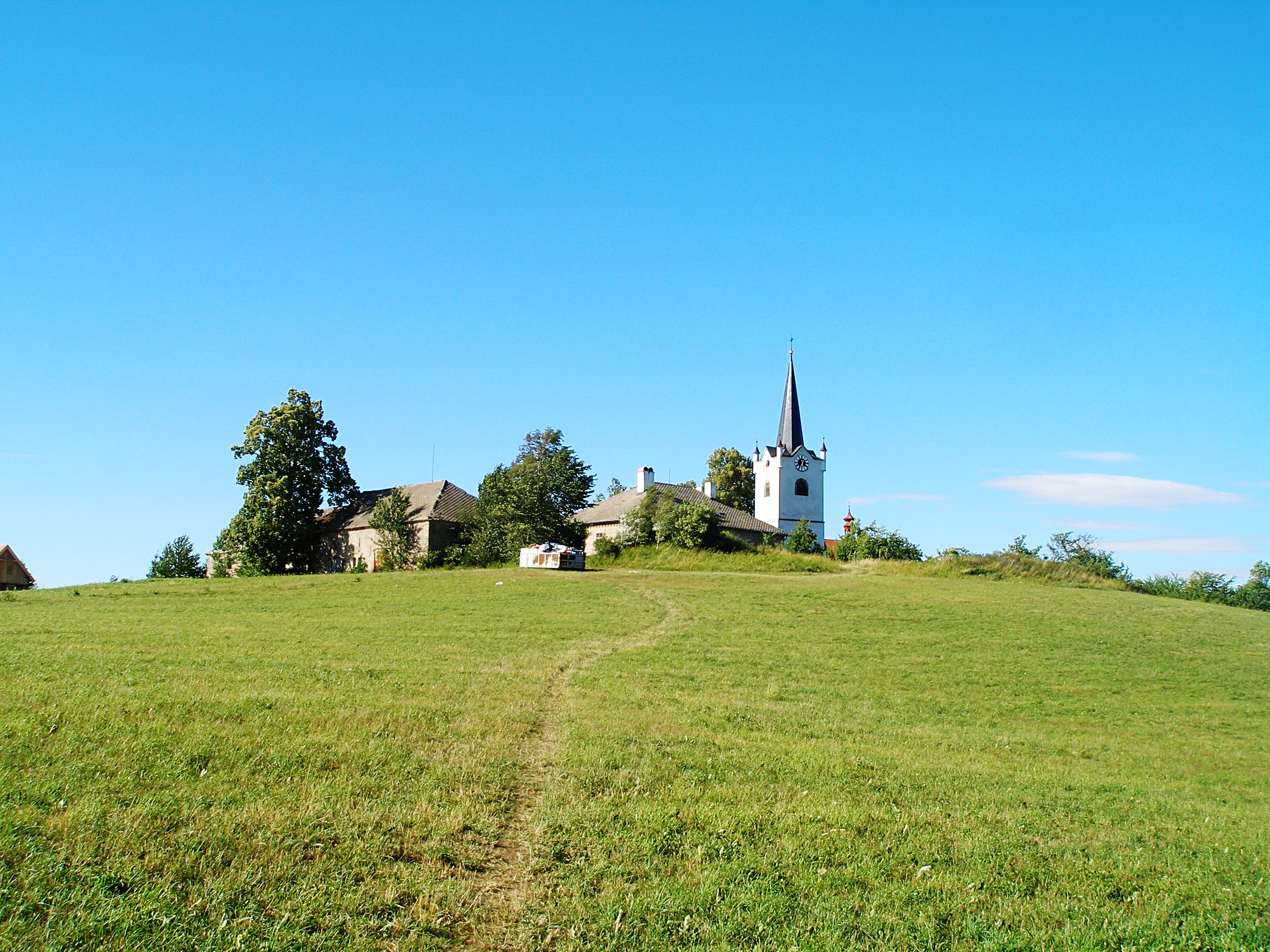
- View towards the Church of the Heart of Jesus

- Location in the Czech Republic
- Coordinates: 48°40′41″N 14°17′13″E
- Country: Czech Republic
- Region: South Bohemian
- District: Český Krumlov
- First mentioned: 1339

Area
  - Total: 27.12 km^{2} (10.47 sq mi)
- Elevation: 794 m (2,605 ft)

Population (2026-01-01)
  - Total: 176
  - Density: 6.49/km^{2} (16.8/sq mi)
- Time zone: UTC+1 (CET)
  - Summer (DST): UTC+2 (CEST)
- Postal codes: 381 01, 382 73
- Website: www.malsin.cz

Malšín (German: Malsching) is a municipality and village in Český Krumlov District in the South Bohemian Region of the Czech Republic. It has about 200 inhabitants.

Malšín lies approximately 15 kilometres (9 mi) south of Český Krumlov, 36 km (22 mi) south-west of České Budějovice, and 157 km (98 mi) south of Prague.

== Administrative division ==
Malšín consists of two municipal parts (in brackets population according to the 2021 census):

- Malšín (72)
- Ostrov (71)

== Demographics ==
Historical population
Year	Pop.	±%
1869	1,580	—
1880	1,651	+4.5%
1890	1,529	−7.4%
1900	1,595	+4.3%
1910	1,555	−2.5%
1921	1,463	−5.9%
1930	1,542	+5.4%
1950	683	−55.7%
1961	344	−49.6%
1970	225	−34.6%
1980	166	−26.2%
1991	134	−19.3%
2001	113	−15.7%
2011	121	+7.1%
2021	143	+18.2%
Source: Censuses
