= Bohdalovice =

- Municipality
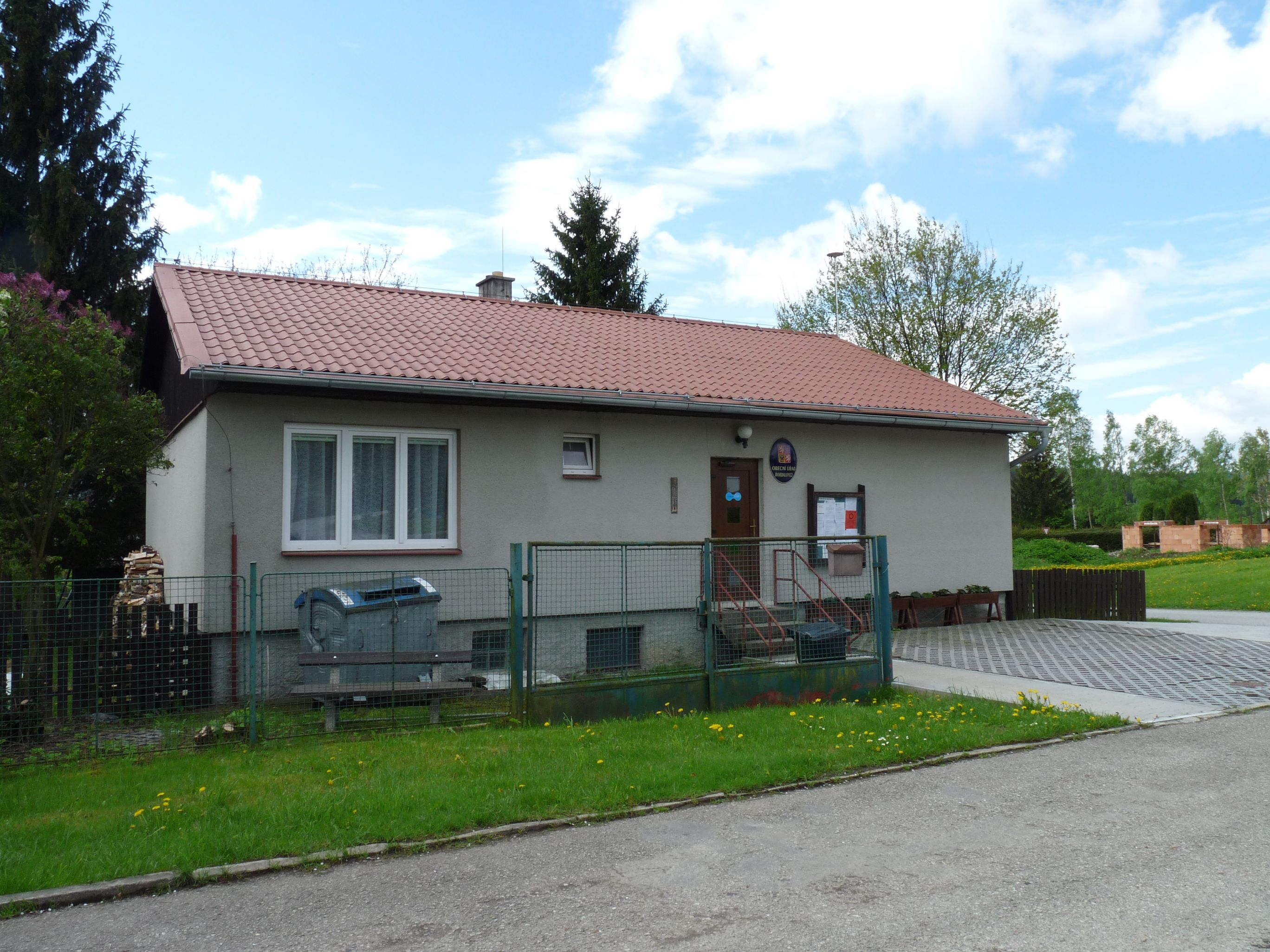
- Municipal office

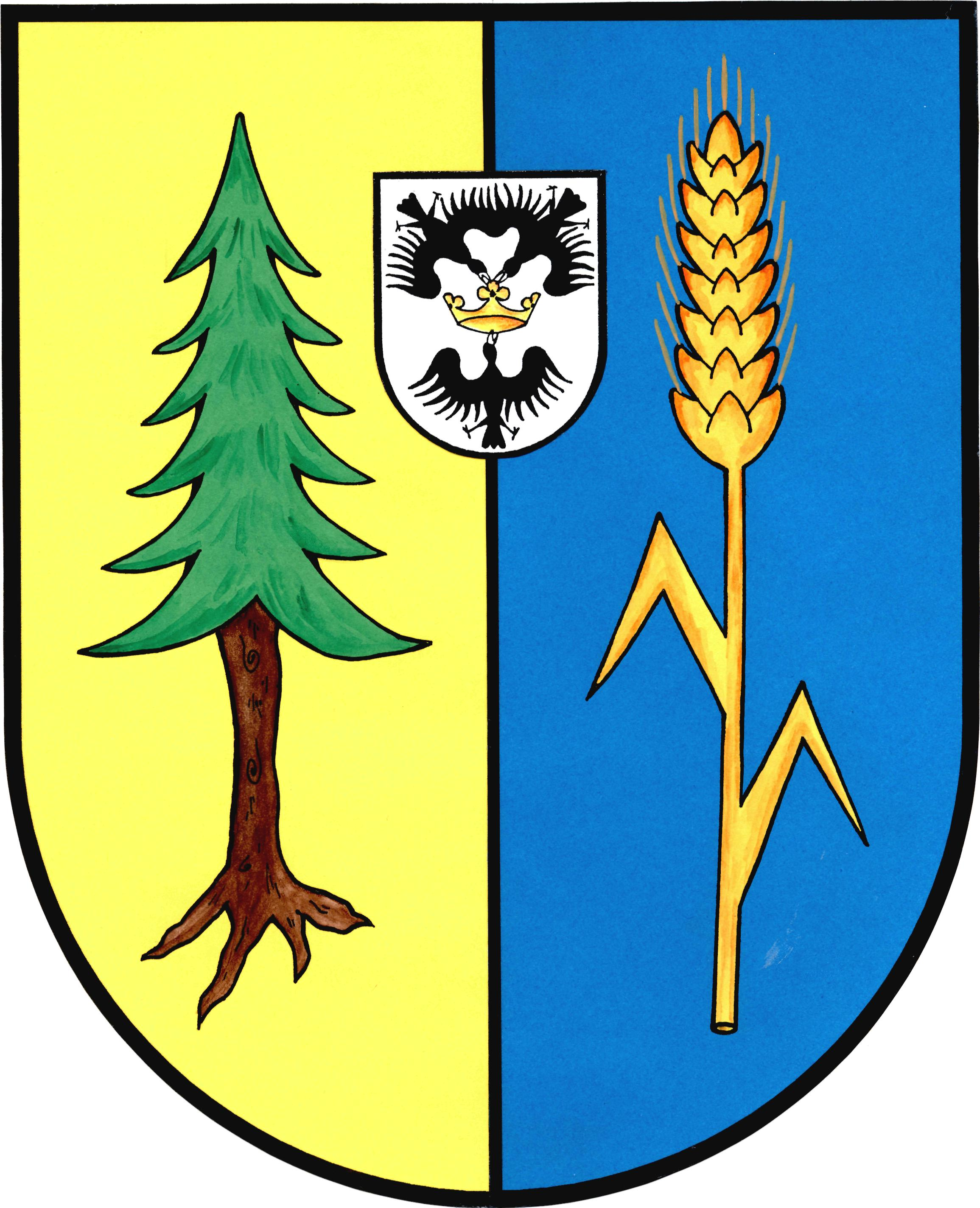
- Flag Coat of arms

- Location in the Czech Republic
- Coordinates: 48°44′35″N 14°17′12″E
- Country: Czech Republic
- Region: South Bohemian
- District: Český Krumlov
- First mentioned: 1310

Area
  - Total: 30.82 km^{2} (11.90 sq mi)
- Elevation: 533 m (1,749 ft)

Population (2026-01-01)
  - Total: 291
  - Density: 9.44/km^{2} (24.5/sq mi)
- Time zone: UTC+1 (CET)
  - Summer (DST): UTC+2 (CEST)
- Postal codes: 381 01, 382 11
- Website: www.obecbohdalovice.cz

Bohdalovice (German: Podesdorf) is a municipality and village in Český Krumlov District in the South Bohemian Region of the Czech Republic. It has about 300 inhabitants.

Bohdalovice lies approximately 8 kilometres (5 mi) south of Český Krumlov, 30 km (19 mi) south-west of České Budějovice, and 150 km (93 mi) south of Prague.

== Administrative division ==
Bohdalovice consists of six municipal parts (in brackets population according to the 2021 census):

- Bohdalovice (132)
- Kaliště (12)
- Slavkov (77)
- Slubice (12)
- Suš (39)
- Svéraz (17)

== Demographics ==
Historical population
Year	Pop.	±%
1869	1,248	—
1880	1,192	−4.5%
1890	1,147	−3.8%
1900	1,184	+3.2%
1910	1,164	−1.7%
1921	1,172	+0.7%
1930	1,317	+12.4%
1950	239	−81.9%
1961	454	+90.0%
1970	361	−20.5%
1980	324	−10.2%
1991	254	−21.6%
2001	264	+3.9%
2011	291	+10.2%
2021	289	−0.7%
Source: Censuses
