= Věžovatá Pláně =

Municipality in the Czech Republic

- Municipality
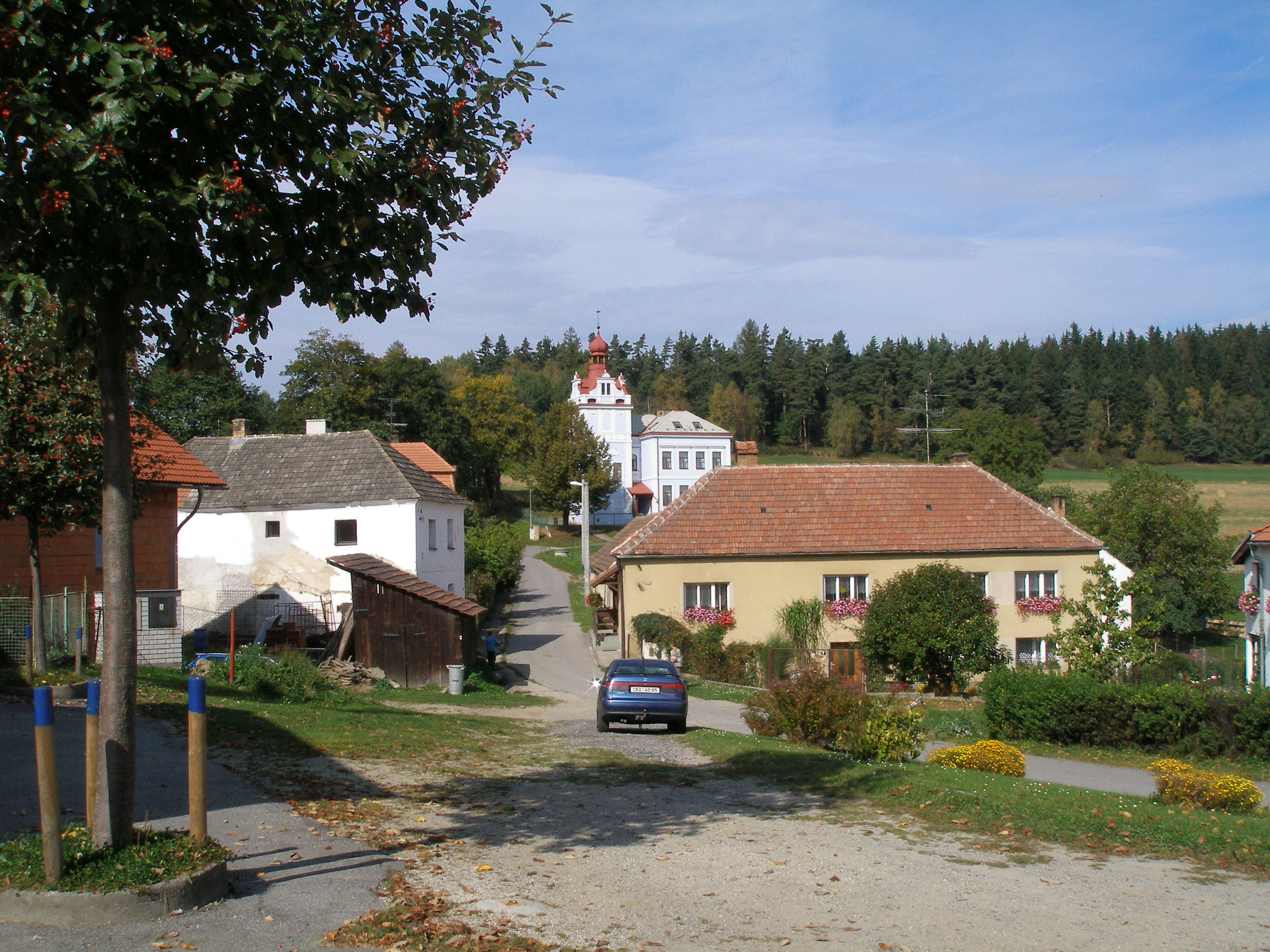
- Centre of Věžovatá Pláně

- Location in the Czech Republic
- Coordinates: 48°46′35″N 14°24′33″E
- Country: Czech Republic
- Region: South Bohemian
- District: Český Krumlov
- First mentioned: 1366

Area
  - Total: 4.80 km^{2} (1.85 sq mi)
- Elevation: 695 m (2,280 ft)

Population (2026-01-01)
  - Total: 164
  - Density: 34.2/km^{2} (88.5/sq mi)
- Time zone: UTC+1 (CET)
  - Summer (DST): UTC+2 (CEST)
- Postal code: 382 32
- Website: www.vezovataplane.cz

Věžovatá Pláně is a municipality and village in Český Krumlov District in the South Bohemian Region of the Czech Republic. It has about 200 inhabitants.

Věžovatá Pláně lies approximately 9 kilometres (6 mi) south-east of Český Krumlov, 23 km (14 mi) south of České Budějovice, and 146 km (91 mi) south of Prague.

== Administrative division ==
Věžovatá Pláně consists of two municipal parts (in brackets population according to the 2021 census):

- Věžovatá Pláně (71)
- Dolní Pláně (88)

== Demographics ==
Historical population
Year	Pop.	±%
1869	218	—
1880	254	+16.5%
1890	256	+0.8%
1900	268	+4.7%
1910	246	−8.2%
1921	214	−13.0%
1930	222	+3.7%
1950	132	−40.5%
1961	169	+28.0%
1970	141	−16.6%
1980	109	−22.7%
1991	99	−9.2%
2001	111	+12.1%
2011	134	+20.7%
2021	159	+18.7%
Source: Censuses
