= Zvíkov (Český Krumlov District) =

- Municipality
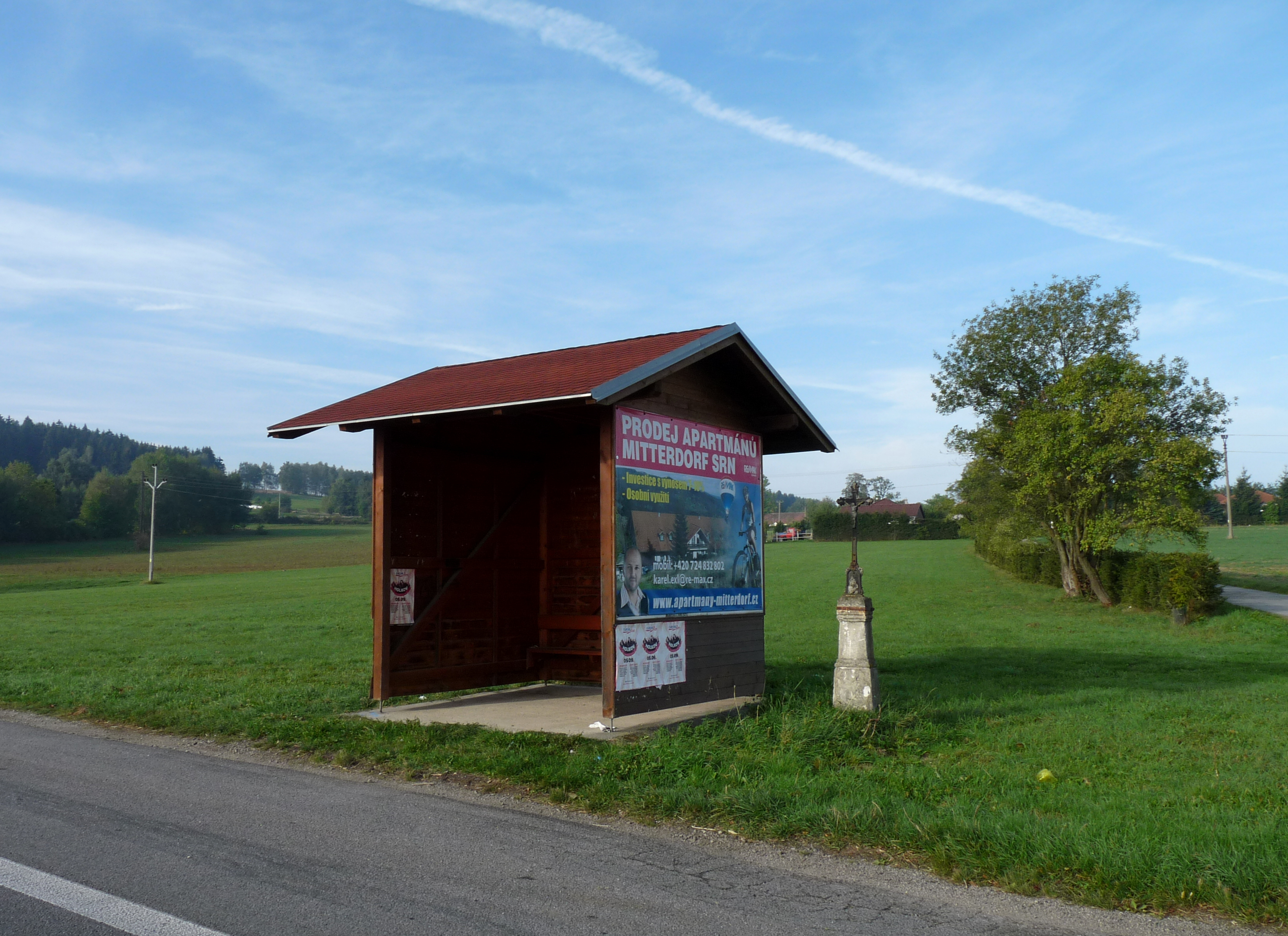
- Bus stop and a wayside cross

- Location in the Czech Republic
- Coordinates: 48°48′9″N 14°26′56″E
- Country: Czech Republic
- Region: South Bohemian
- District: Český Krumlov
- First mentioned: 1371

Area
  - Total: 2.90 km^{2} (1.12 sq mi)
- Elevation: 578 m (1,896 ft)

Population (2026-01-01)
  - Total: 95
  - Density: 33/km^{2} (85/sq mi)
- Time zone: UTC+1 (CET)
  - Summer (DST): UTC+2 (CEST)
- Postal code: 382 32
- Website: www.obeczvikov.cz

Zvíkov is a municipality and village in Český Krumlov District in the South Bohemian Region of the Czech Republic. It has about 100 inhabitants.

Zvíkov lies approximately 10 kilometres (6 mi) east of Český Krumlov, 19 km (12 mi) south of České Budějovice, and 143 km (89 mi) south of Prague.

== Etymology ==
The name is derived either from the personal name Zviek, meaning "Zviek's", or from the Old Czech word zviek ('sound').

== Demographics ==
Historical population
| Year | Pop. | ±% |
|---|---|---|
| 1869 | 141 | — |
| 1880 | 164 | +16.3% |
| 1890 | 151 | −7.9% |
| 1900 | 150 | −0.7% |
| 1910 | 174 | +16.0% |
| 1921 | 178 | +2.3% |
| 1930 | 180 | +1.1% |
| 1950 | 113 | −37.2% |
| 1961 | 111 | −1.8% |
| 1970 | 85 | −23.4% |
| 1980 | 79 | −7.1% |
| 1991 | 66 | −16.5% |
| 2001 | 47 | −28.8% |
| 2011 | 74 | +57.4% |
| 2021 | 95 | +28.4% |
Source: Censuses
