= Vitín =

- Municipality
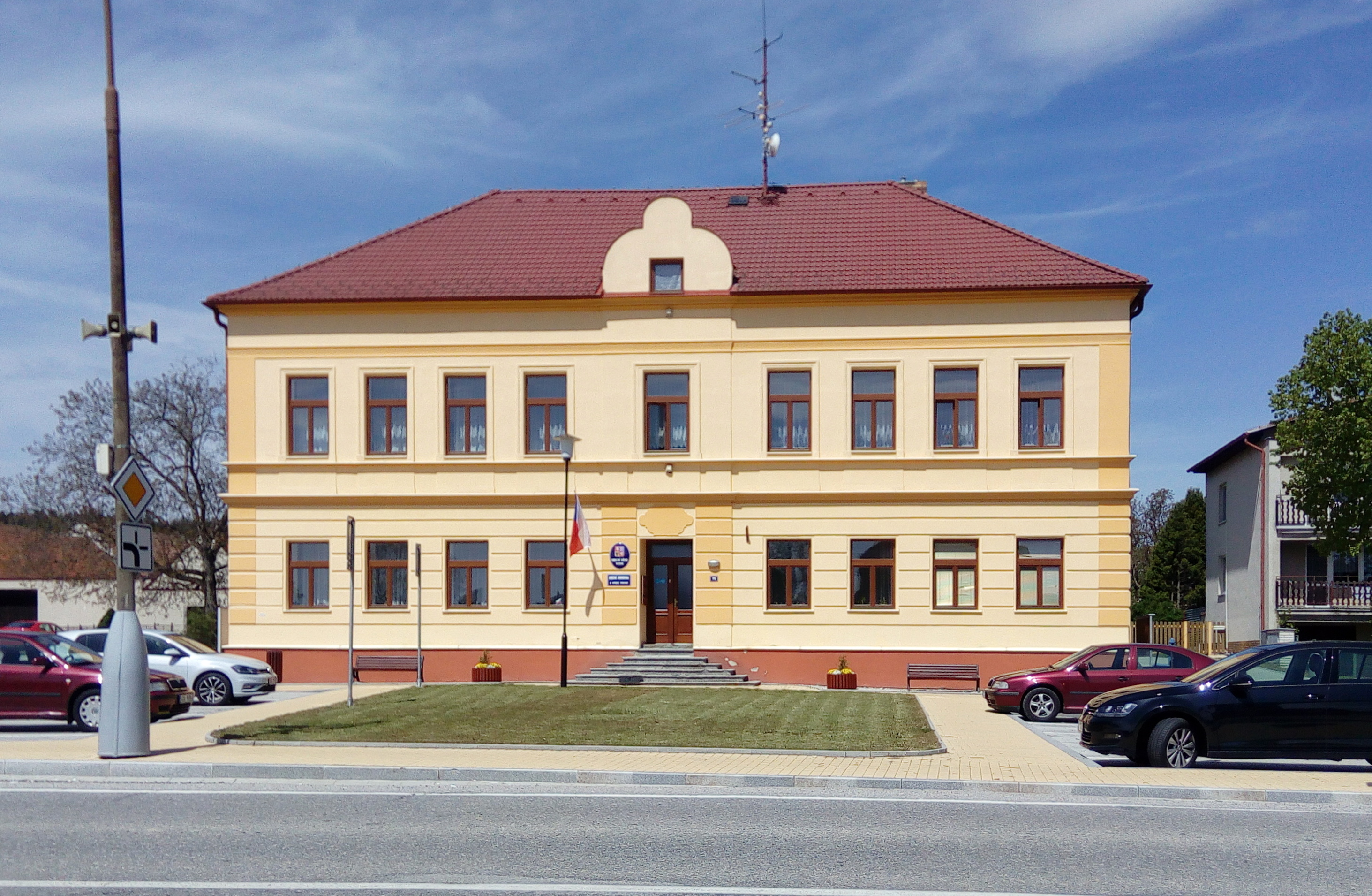
- Municipal office

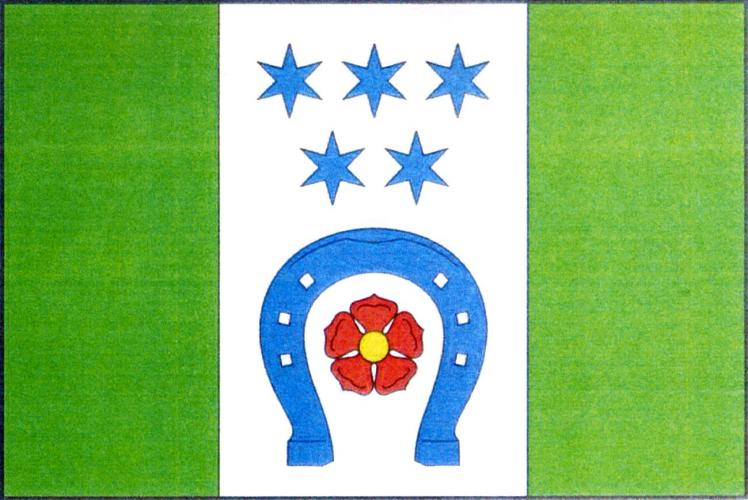
- Flag Coat of arms

- Location in the Czech Republic
- Coordinates: 49°5′22″N 14°32′45″E
- Country: Czech Republic
- Region: South Bohemian
- District: České Budějovice
- First mentioned: 1459

Area
  - Total: 7.62 km^{2} (2.94 sq mi)
- Elevation: 503 m (1,650 ft)

Population (2026-01-01)
  - Total: 489
  - Density: 64.2/km^{2} (166/sq mi)
- Time zone: UTC+1 (CET)
  - Summer (DST): UTC+2 (CEST)
- Postal code: 373 63
- Website: www.vitin.cz

Vitín (Czech pronunciation: [ˈvɪciːn]) is a municipality and village in České Budějovice District in the South Bohemian Region of the Czech Republic. It has about 500 inhabitants. The historic centre of the village is well preserved and is protected as a village monument zone.

== Etymology ==
The name is derived from the personal name Víta.

== Geography ==
Vitín is located about 12 kilometres (7 mi) north of České Budějovice. It lies on the border between the Tábor Uplands and Třeboň Basin. The highest point is on the slopes of the forested hill of Bába at 562 m (1,844 ft) above sea level.

== History ==
The first written mention of Vitín is from 1459.

== Demographics ==
Historical population

Year	Pop.	±%
1869	454	—
1880	439	−3.3%
1890	406	−7.5%
1900	435	+7.1%
1910	491	+12.9%

Year	Pop.	±%
1921	534	+8.8%
1930	498	−6.7%
1950	492	−1.2%
1961	497	+1.0%
1970	383	−22.9%

Year	Pop.	±%
1980	307	−19.8%
1991	260	−15.3%
2001	246	−5.4%
2011	380	+54.5%
2021	456	+20.0%

Source: Censuses

== Transport ==
The D3 motorway (part of the European route E55) from Prague to České Budějovice runs through the municipality.

The railway from České Budějovice to Tábor passes through the municipality, but there is no train station. Vitín is served by the stations in neighbouring Chotýčany and Ševětín.

== Sights ==
Vitín is known for two large pagan Slavic barrow cemeteries dating from the 8th–9th centuries. They are located on the slopes of the hill Bába; one of them is inside the municipality of Vitín and one of them is outside. They are among the best preserved in the country. The cemeteries contain 69 and 80 barrows ordered in distinct lines going from the west to the east. The highest of them have about 4–5 metres in diameter and are 2 metres high.
