= Speed limits in the Czech Republic =

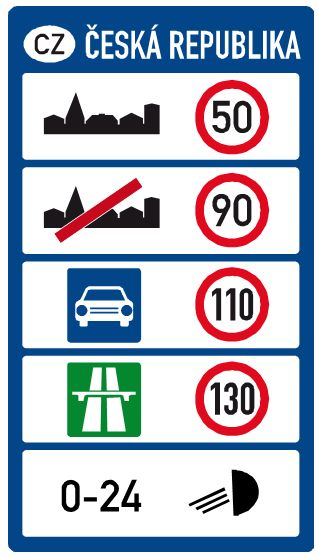
Border road sign with general speed limits in the Czech Republic (2016)

Speed limits in the Czech Republic vary depending on the type of road, and whether the road is within a settlement or not. The top speed limit is 150 km/h (93 mph) on specified motorway routes and 130 km/h (81 mph) for all other motorways outside of settlements. The speed limit on expressways is 110 km/h (68 mph). On all other regular roads (other than motorways and expressways), the speed limit is 50 km/h (31 mph) within a settlement and 90 km/h (56 mph) outside of a settlement. Various other special restrictions are applied for certain types and weight categories of vehicle.

== Historical speed limits ==
On 29 January 1900, a government ordinance limited the speed of vehicles inside settlements to the velocity of a hand-cantering horse. In 1935, the speed limit inside settlements was set at 35 km/h (22 mph). Vehicles with two or more trailers were limited to 35 km/h, while trucks and buses were limited to 50 km/h (31 mph). However, public buses could ask for an exception.

A law in 1950 limited the speed in thick fog to 25 km/h (16 mph) and at level crossings to 15 km/h (9.3 mph). An ordinance introduced in 1953 specified places where speed needs to be slow, i.e. under 15 km/h: along processions, at pedestrian crossings, while the driver is entering the road, near buses or trams, near work places, while the road is oily or while pedestrian traffic is dense.

A law in 1960 limited the speed inside settlements between 5 a.m. and 11 p.m. to 50 km/h (31 mph). Buses and trucks over 3,500 kg (7,700 lb) were limited outside settlements to 80 km/h (50 mph). Also, in 1966, motorcycles were limited to 80 km/h. Long-distance buses were freed from limits. Towed automobiles were limited to 50 km/h.

Speed limits were abolished on motorways (dálnice), even for trucks and motorcycles, in 1971. Furthermore, in 1976, all of the 50 km/h limits were increased to 60 km/h (37 mph). The special limits for motorcycles, trucks and buses were repealed. The ordinance in 1979 was the first to limit speeds outside of settlements. Cars were limited to 90 km/h (56 mph) and 110 km/h (68 mph) on motorways, long-distance buses to 90 km/h, motorcycles and trucks under 6,000 kg (13,000 lb) to 80 km/h (50 mph), trucks over 6000 kg and buses to 70 km/h (43 mph). The limit of 60 km/h (only between 5 a.m. and 11 p.m.) was kept for roads inside settlements.

A limit of 90 km/h (56 mph) and 110 km/h (68 mph) on motorways was established in 1989 for vehicles under 3500 kg and for buses. Furthermore, motorcycles were limited to 90 km/h and all other motor vehicles were limited to 80 km/h (50 mph). The speed inside settlements was limited 60 km/h (37 mph) and 80 km/h on motorways, including at night. Specially signed pedestrian zones and house zones was introduced with a 20 km/h (12 mph) limit.

Ordinance No. 223/1997 Sb., which took effect on October 1, 1997, reduced the settlement limit to 50 km/h (31 mph) and increased the motorway limit to 130 km/h (81 mph), including for motorcycles.

On October 5, 2025, a trial on a 47 kilometer long section of the D3 motorway between the motorway junctions of Planá nad Lužnicí and Úsilné began, which raised the speed limit on the section to 150 km/h (93 mph). However, the section uses variable speed limit signs which allow 150 km/h only if favorable conditions are met. The trial was originally supposed to last for 6 months, but it has been extended until the end of 2026 due to lack of data to determine the safety and flow of traffic.

== Current speed limits ==
As of 2019 on motorways (dálnice) the speed limit is 130 km/h (81 mph) and on roads for motorcars (silnice pro motorová vozidla) the speed limit is 110 km/h (68 mph). In settlements, the speed limit is set to 80 km/h (50 mph) both on motorways and roads for motorcars.

On regular roads, the speed limit is set to 90 km/h (56 mph) and the settlement limit is 50 km/h (31 mph). Inside any settlement zone (obytná zóna) marked by a special blue sign and pedestrian zone (pěší zóna) the speed limit is set to 20 km/h (12 mph) and drivers must give way to other vehicles when exiting them. Inside any cyclist zone (cyklistická zóna) the speed limit is set to 30 km/h (19 mph).

50 metres (160 ft) before a level crossing with railway, the speed limit is further reduced to 30 km/h (19 mph) or 50 km/h (31 mph) in case of visible flashing of a white traffic light.

There are special restrictions for certain kinds of vehicles, especially weighing over 3.5 t (3.4 long tons; 3.9 short tons). The speed limit for towing with a rope or tow bar is 60 km/h (37 mph). The speed limit when a car has chains on is 50 km/h (31 mph).

== Minimum speed limits ==
No minimum speed limits are currently in place.

Vehicles incapable of reaching the speed of 80 km/h (50 mph) are not allowed to enter motorways (dálnice) and roads for motorcars (silnice pro motorová vozidla).

== Road signs ==
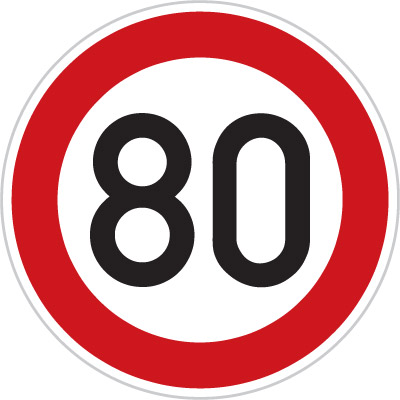
Indicates a limit of 80 km/h. The limit ends at an end sign or after some distance if there is no end sign.

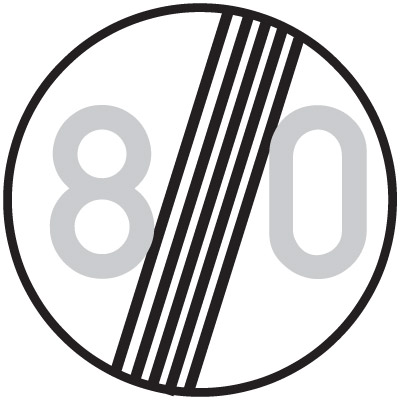
Indicates that the specially decided limit ends and the normal legal limit is valid. It can be 50, 90, 110 or 130

Same as the previous but also end of no-overtaking zone

Motorway, 130 km/h

Roads for motorcars, 110 km/h

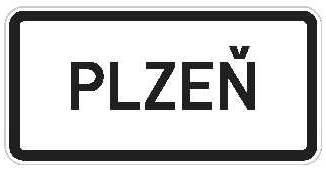
Built-up area, 50 km/h

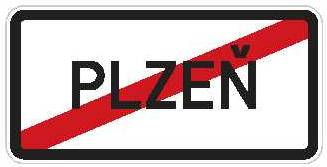
End of built-up area, 90 km/h
