= Jeníčkova Lhota =

Village in the South Bohemian Region, Czech Republic

Coordinates: 49°27′25″N 14°42′55″E

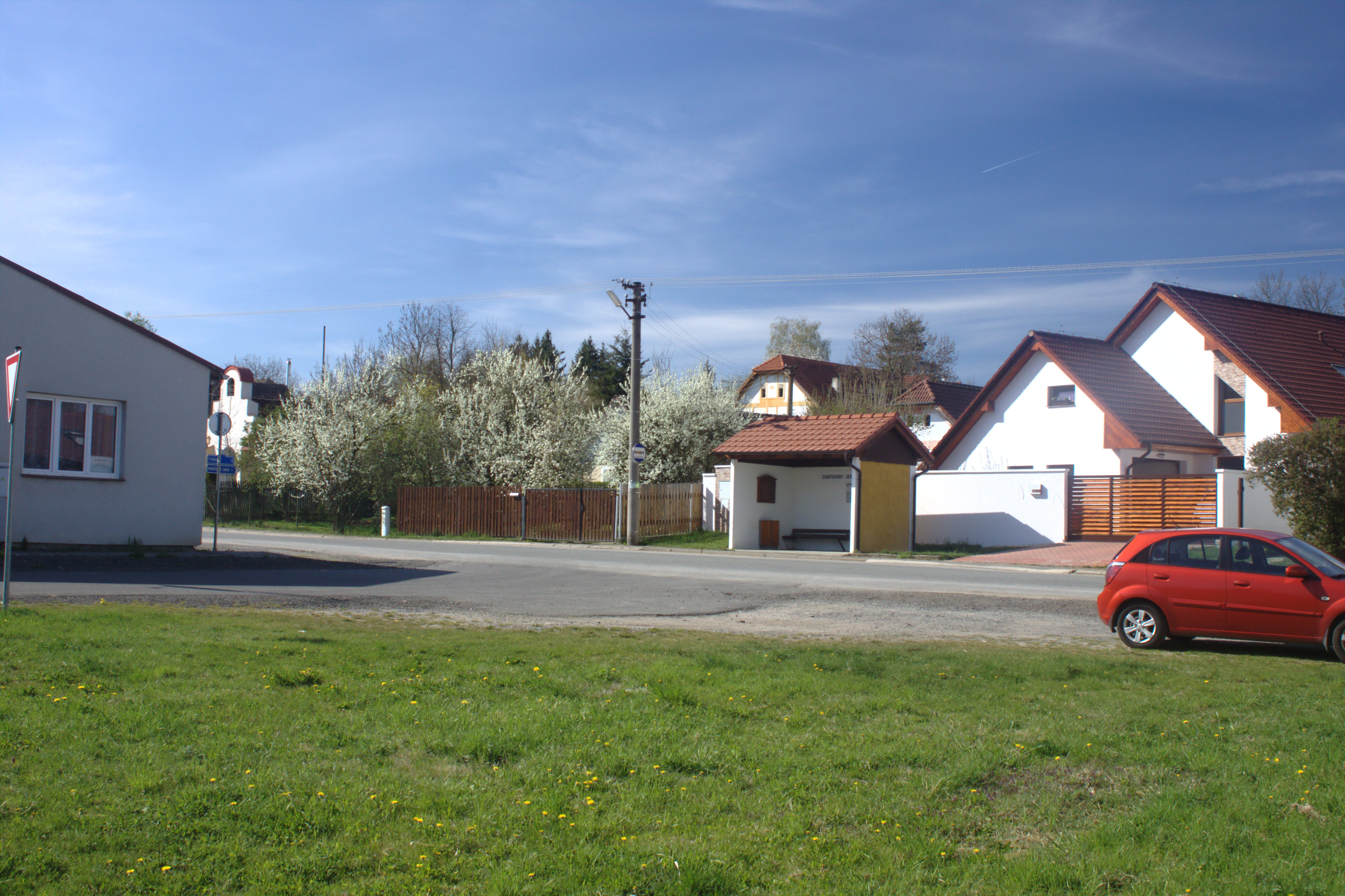
Village common

Jeníčkova Lhota is a village and a part of the Chotoviny municipality in the South Bohemian Region of the Czech Republic.

== Old historical names ==
Pňová Lhota, Přímá Lhota, Pněví Lhota, Purkartova Lhota, Paldíkova Lhota

== History ==
Jeníčkova Lhota was first mentioned in the year 1360, in connection with Přibík Lysec of Pňová Lhota and ancestor of yeoman's clan Štítný ze Štítného - Mikšík of Pňová Lhota. In the year 1621 Jeníčkova Lhota was burnt out by troops sieged near hussite town Tábor, and lately the village was recovered by Kašpar Hencl of Štenberk. After the Thirty Years' War the village was divided into five parts:

- Pacov part – belonged to Whitefriars from Pacov
- Měšice part – belonged to farmhouse in Měšice
- Chotoviny part – belonged to Vít's of Rzavé, lately Vratislav's of Mitrovice
- Kostelní záduší part – belonged to vicary in Chotoviny
- So called "Free part" – owned by independent Sedloň's clan

=== Notable families ===
Volf of Jeníčkova and Broučkova Lhota, Jeníček, Zavadil, Berka, Sedloň, Herout, Mík, Slunéčko and others.

=== Fortress ===
The fortress in Jeníčkova Lhota was built in the 18th century and rebuilt as a manor house with a chapel two centuries later. Today it stands almost in ruins.

== Gallery ==
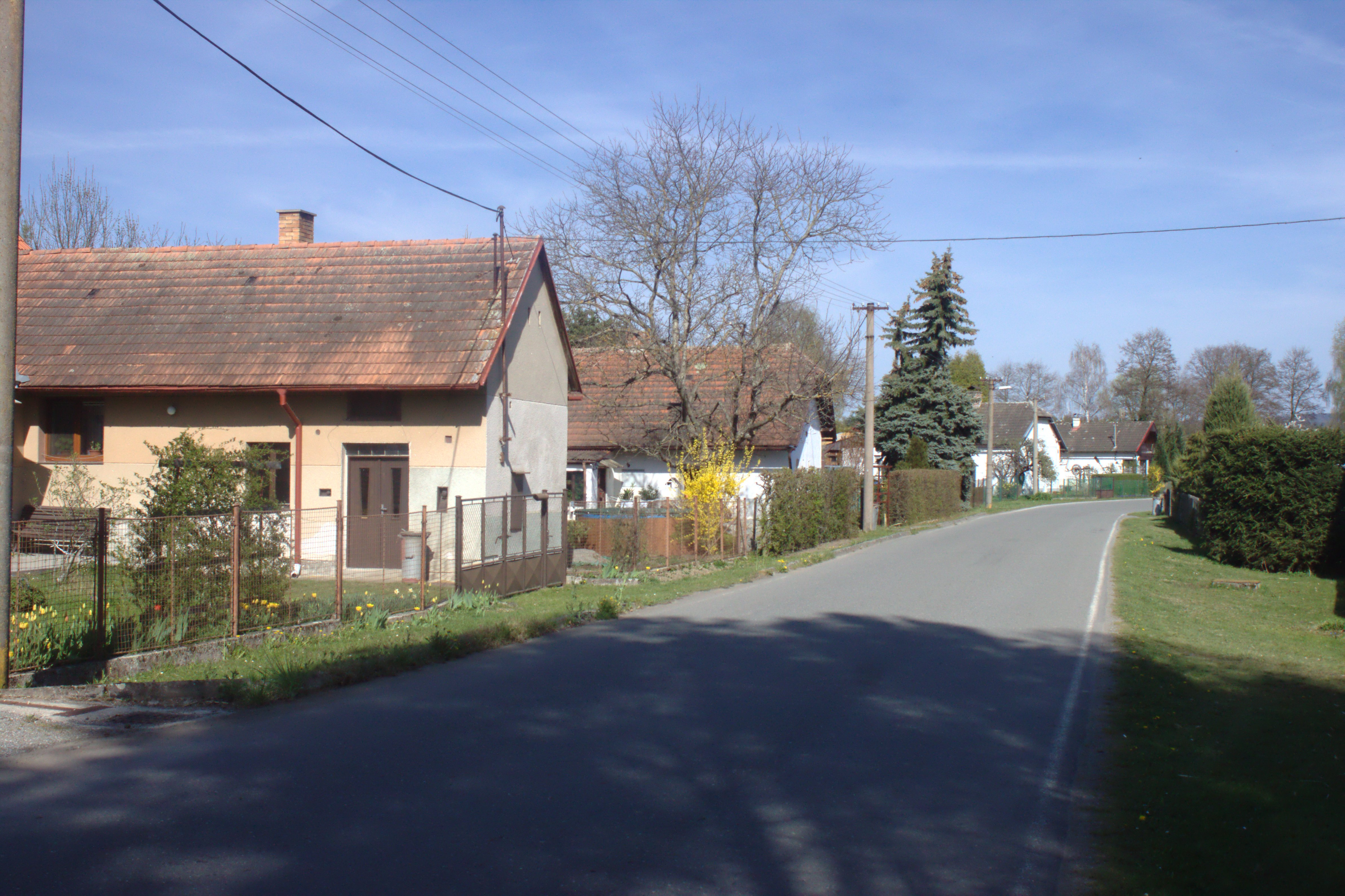
Cottages

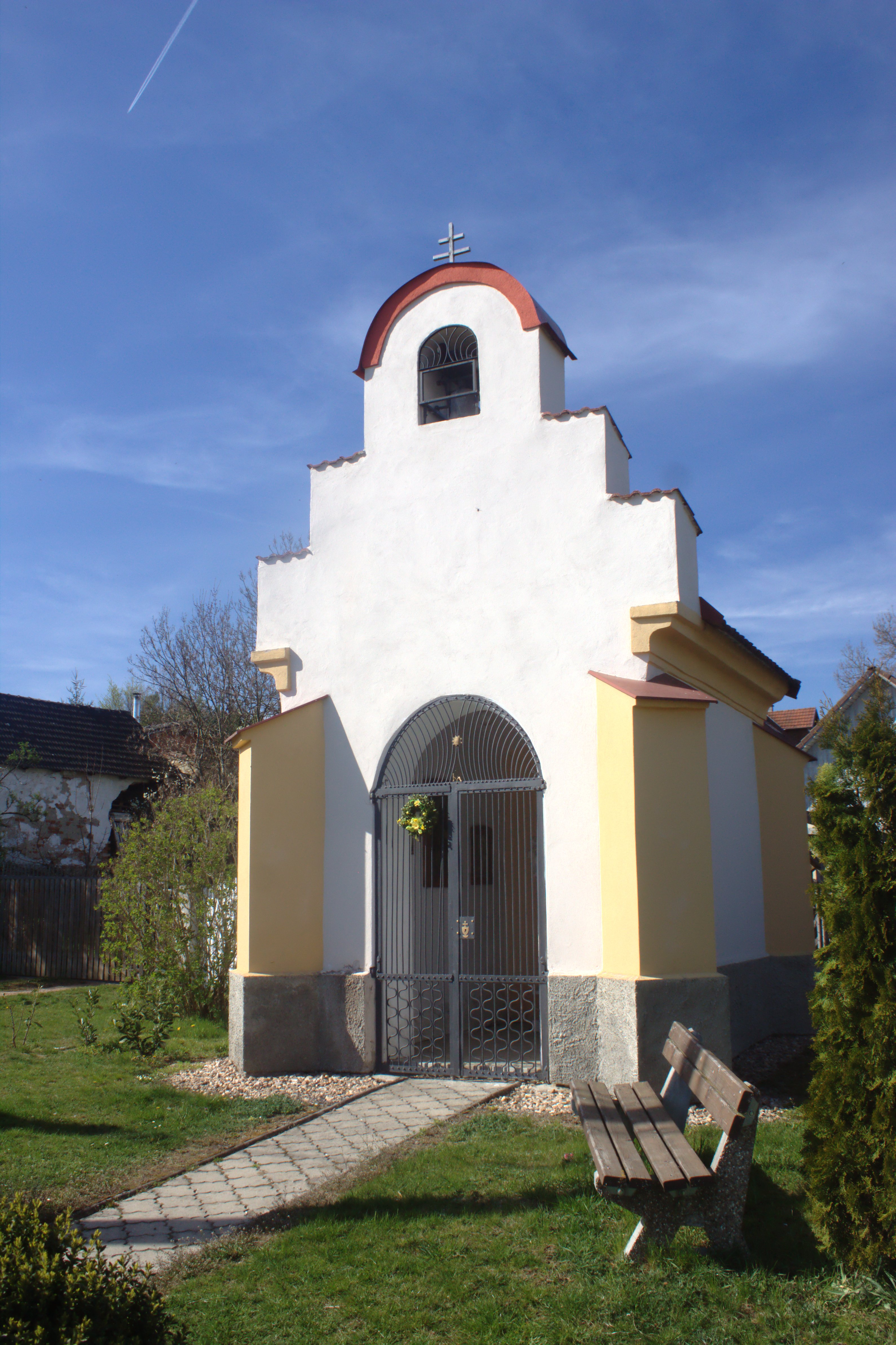
Village chapel

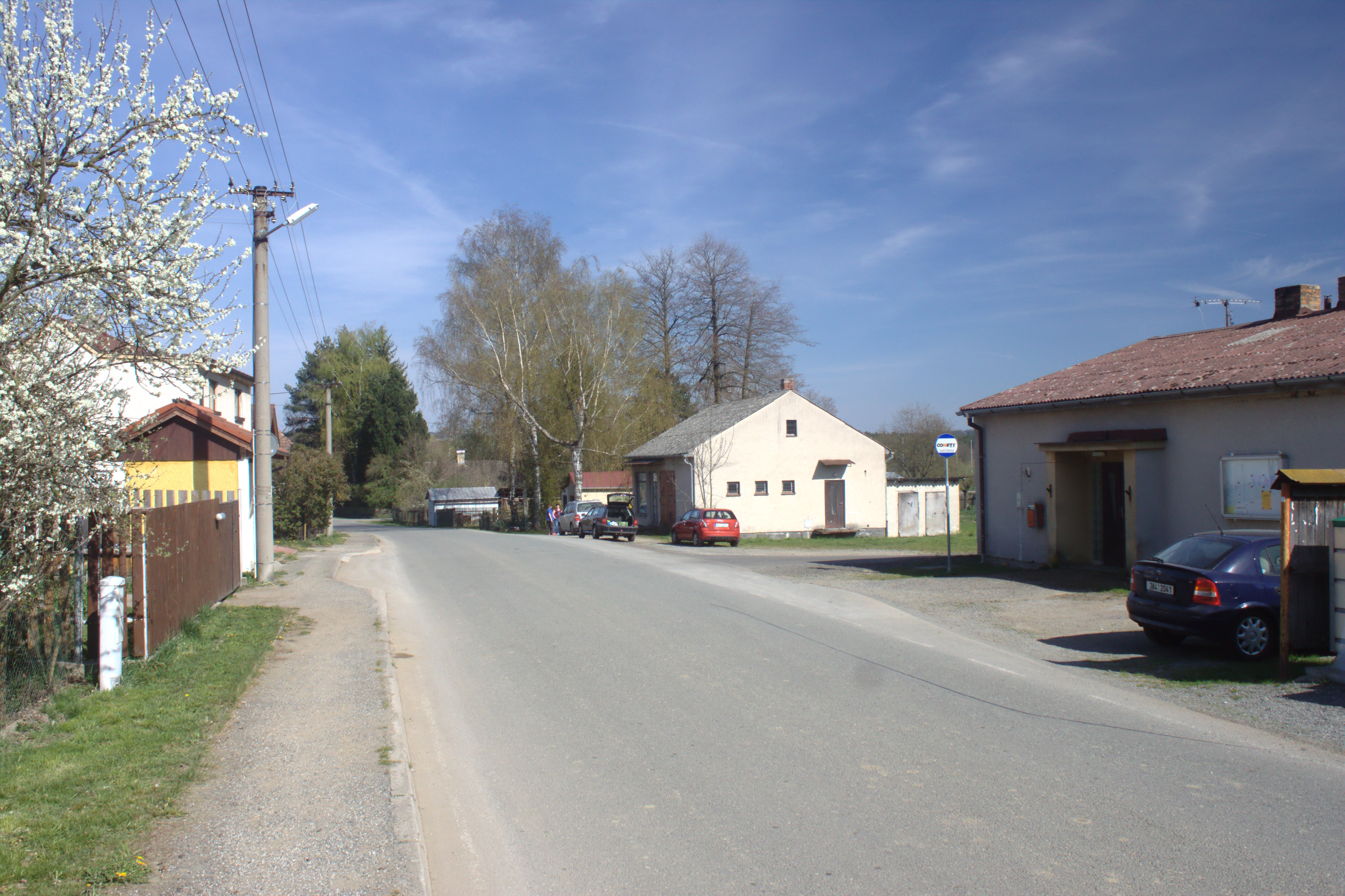
Village square
