= Leopold Anton Kirchner =

Austrian physician and entomologist

Leopold Anton Kirchner (? – 29 December 1879 Kaplice, Bohemia), sometimes Kirschnerm, was an Austrian medical doctor and entomologist.

Kirschner's medical practice was in Kaplice. He specialised in Hymenoptera (sawflies, wasps, bees, and ants) and Diptera (flies).

== Works ==
- Kirchner, L. 1854. Verzeichniss der in der Gegend von Kaplitz, Budweiser Kreises in Böhmen, vorkommenden Aderflügler. Verhandlungen des Zoologisch-botanischen Vereins in Wien 4: 285–316. [in German]
- Kirchner, L. 1867. Catalogus Hymenopterorum Europae. K. K. Zoologisch-Botanische Gesellschaft, Vienna, Austria. 285 pp. [in German]
