= Mrač =

- Municipality
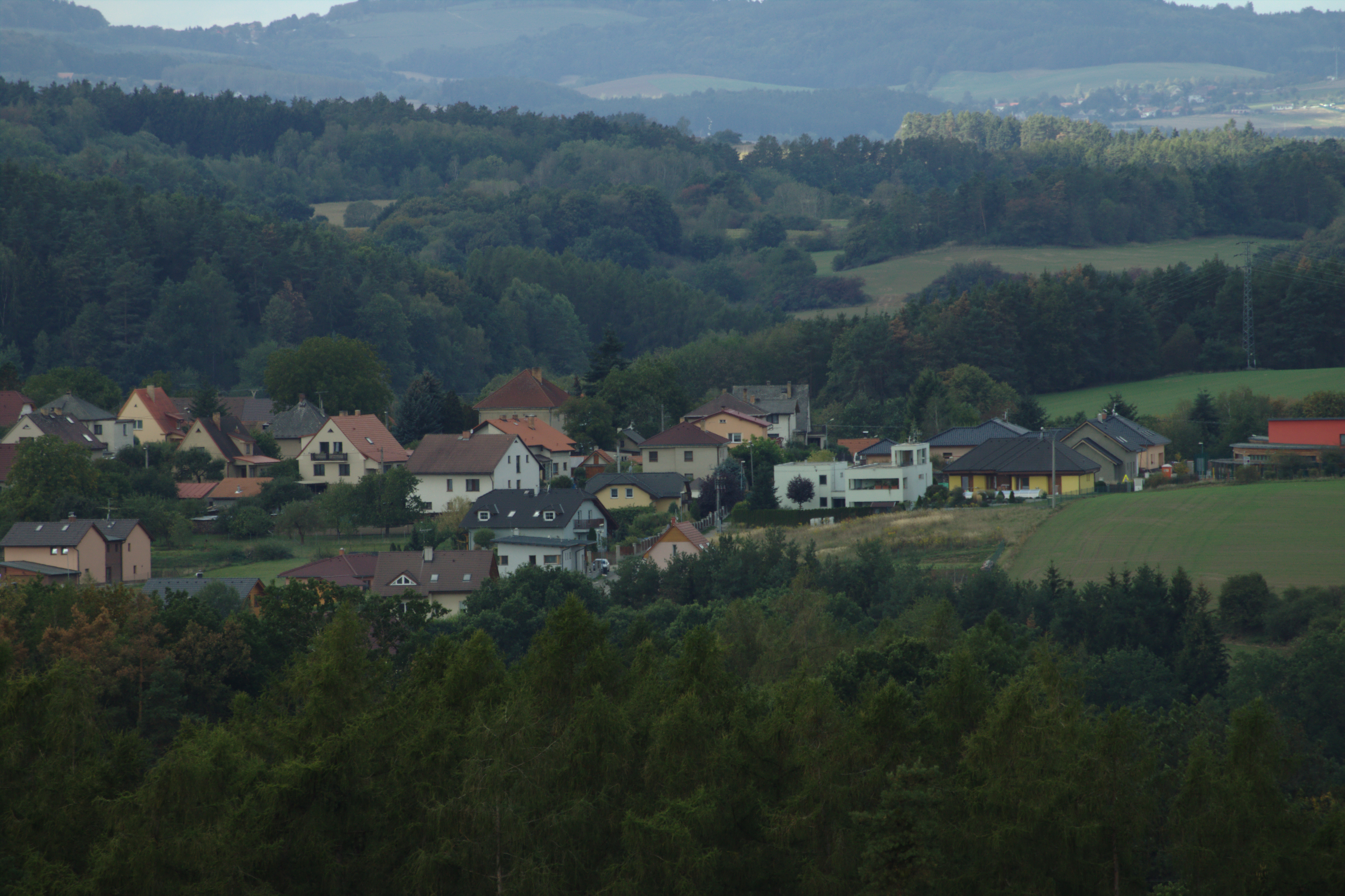
- View from the east

- Flag Coat of arms

- Location in the Czech Republic
- Coordinates: 49°49′47″N 14°41′26″E
- Country: Czech Republic
- Region: Central Bohemian
- District: Benešov
- First mentioned: 1318

Area
  - Total: 6.15 km^{2} (2.37 sq mi)
- Elevation: 331 m (1,086 ft)

Population (2026-01-01)
  - Total: 886
  - Density: 144/km^{2} (373/sq mi)
- Time zone: UTC+1 (CET)
  - Summer (DST): UTC+2 (CEST)
- Postal code: 257 21
- Website: www.mrac.cz

Mrač is a municipality and village in Benešov District in the Central Bohemian Region of the Czech Republic. It has about 900 inhabitants.

== Etymology ==
The name is derived from the personal name Mrak, meaning "Mrak's (court or castle)".

== Geography ==
Mrač is located about 5 kilometres (3 mi) north of Benešov and 26 km (16 mi) southeast of Prague. It lies in the Benešov Uplands. The highest point is the hill V Hrobech at 410 m (1,350 ft) above sea level, located on the southern municipal border. The stream Benešovský potok flows through the municipality.

== History ==
The first written mention of Mrač is from 1318. The owners changed often and included various lesser nobles. In 1727, Mrač was sold to Count Jan Josef of Vrtba, who annexed it to the Konopiště estate.

== Demographics ==
Historical population

| Year | Pop. | ±% |
|---|---|---|
| 1869 | 387 | — |
| 1880 | 451 | +16.5% |
| 1890 | 562 | +24.6% |
| 1900 | 554 | −1.4% |
| 1910 | 512 | −7.6% |

| Year | Pop. | ±% |
|---|---|---|
| 1921 | 483 | −5.7% |
| 1930 | 582 | +20.5% |
| 1950 | 568 | −2.4% |
| 1961 | 661 | +16.4% |
| 1970 | 650 | −1.7% |

| Year | Pop. | ±% |
|---|---|---|
| 1980 | 613 | −5.7% |
| 1991 | 577 | −5.9% |
| 2001 | 643 | +11.4% |
| 2011 | 800 | +24.4% |
| 2021 | 907 | +13.4% |

Source: Censuses

== Transport ==
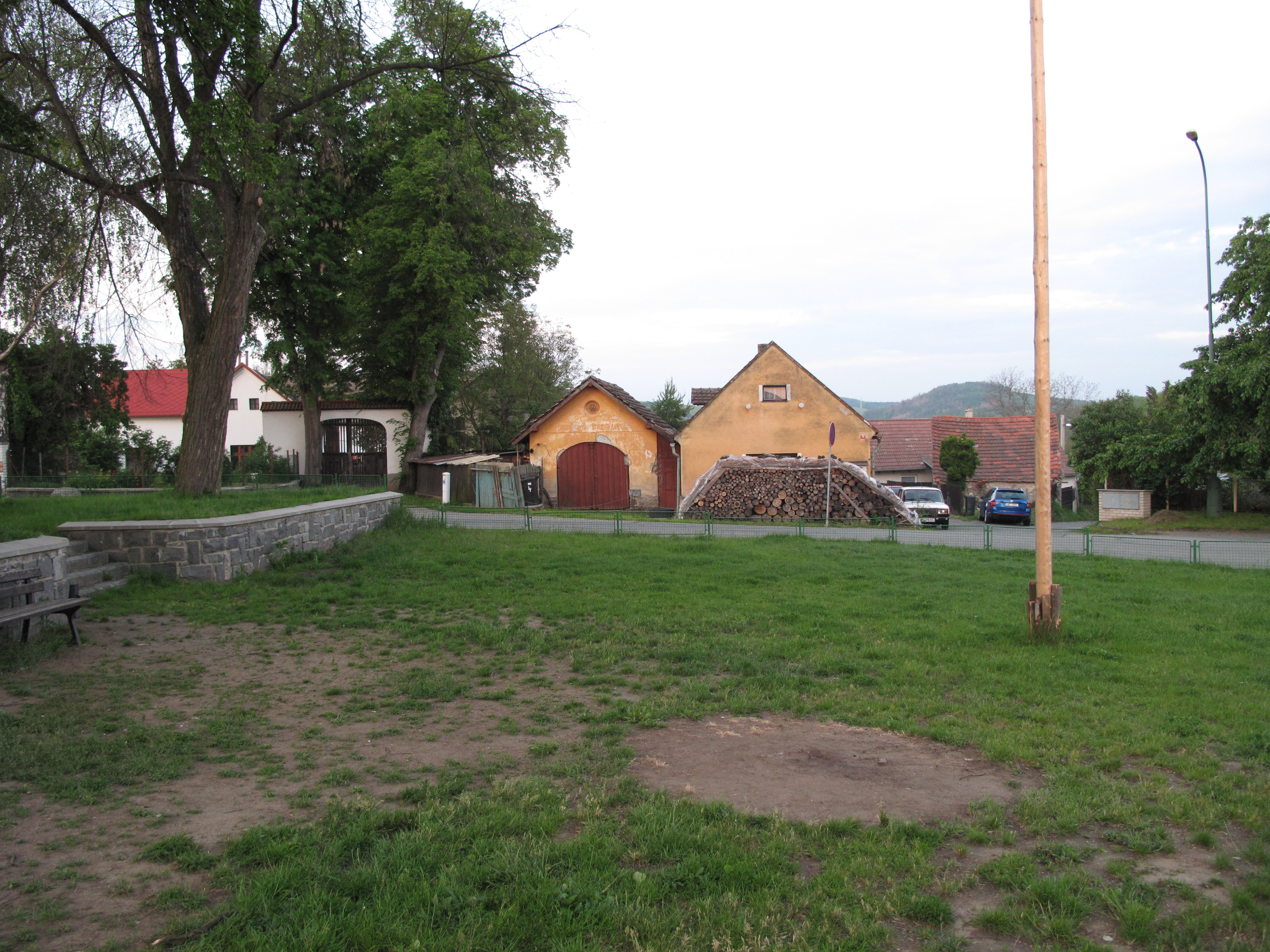
Centre of Mrač

The I/3 road (part of the European route E55), which replaces the unfinished section of the D3 motorway from Prague to Tábor, runs through the municipality.

Mrač is located on the Prague–Benešov railway line.

== Sights ==
The only cultural monument in Mrač is the Mrač Fortress. It is a complex of three buildings that consists of a stronghold from the 13th century, a brick fortress from the end of the 14th century, and the remains of a castle.

== Gallery ==
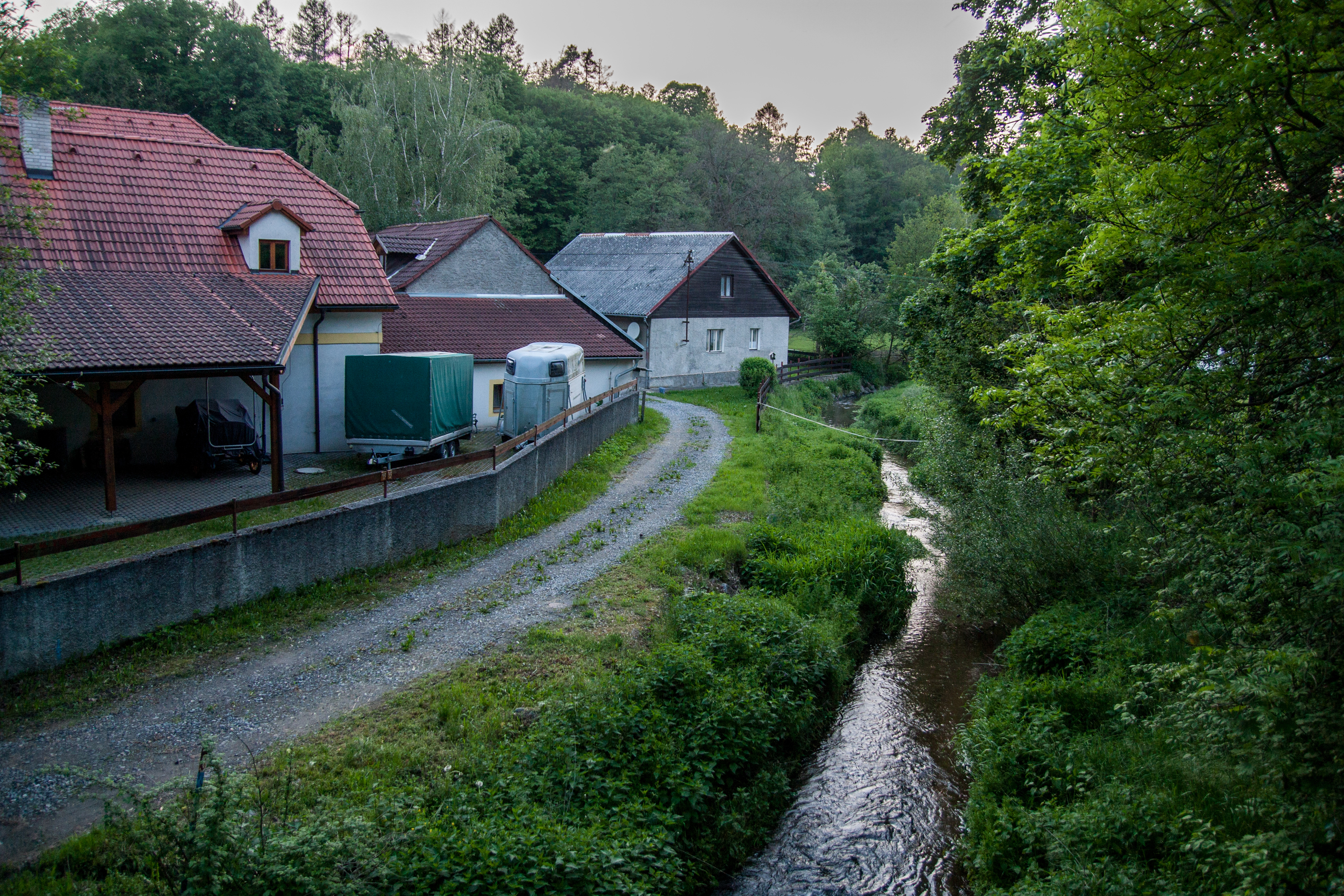
Benešovský potok in Mrač

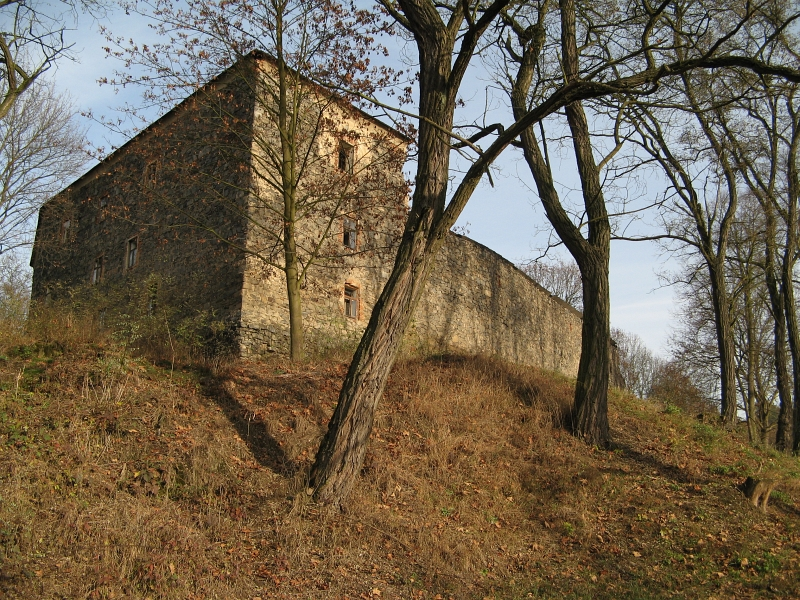
Mrač Fortress

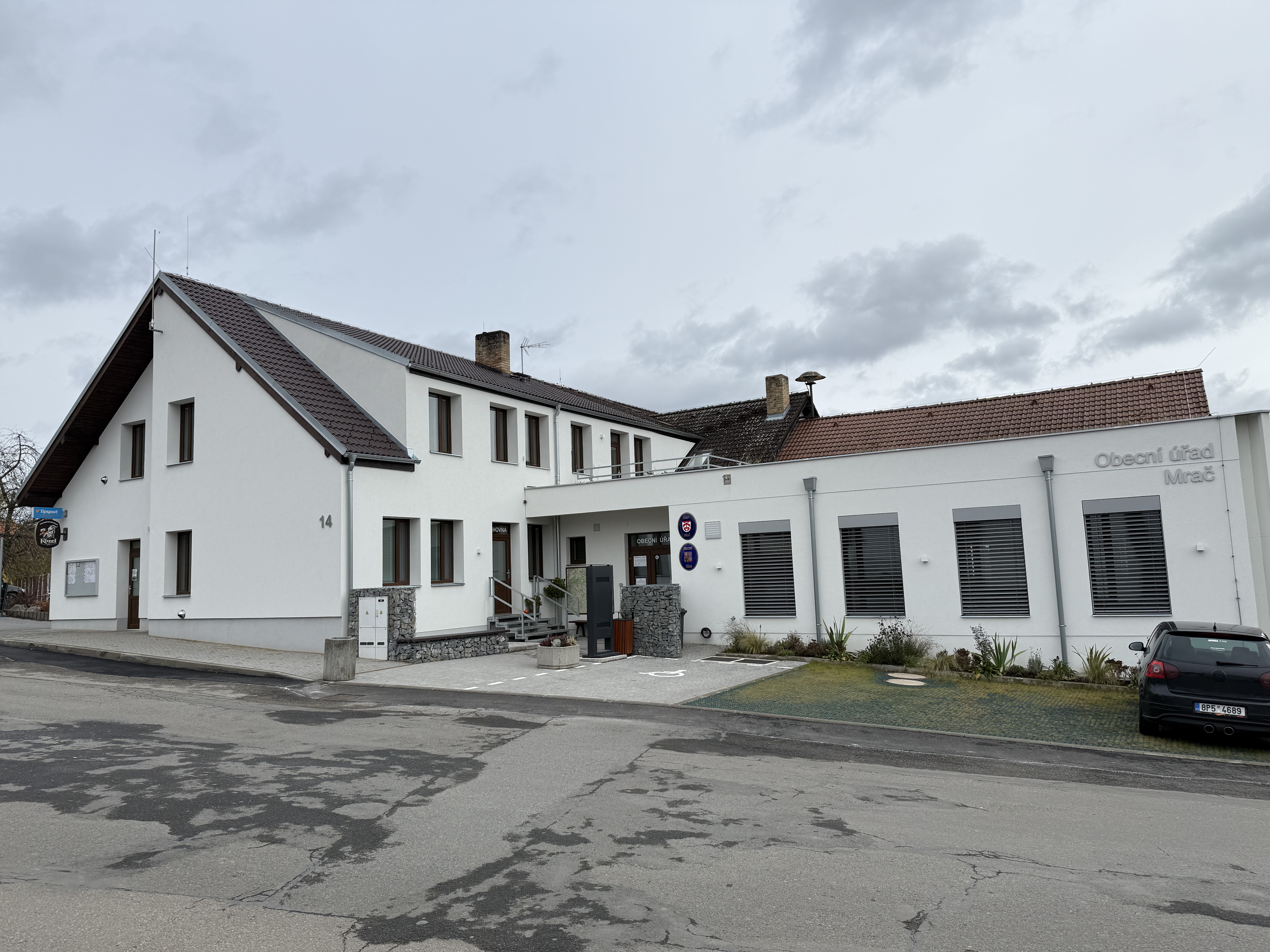
Municipal office
