= Chotýčany =

- Municipality
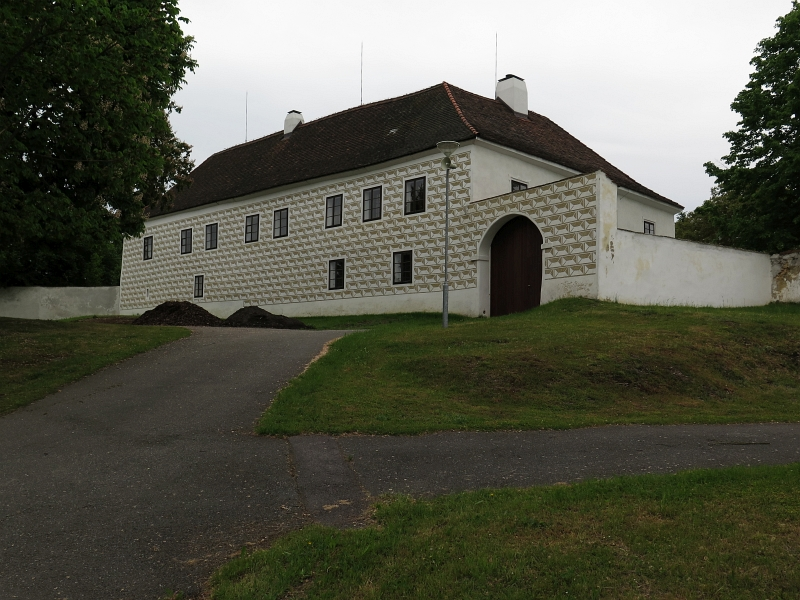
- Historical inn

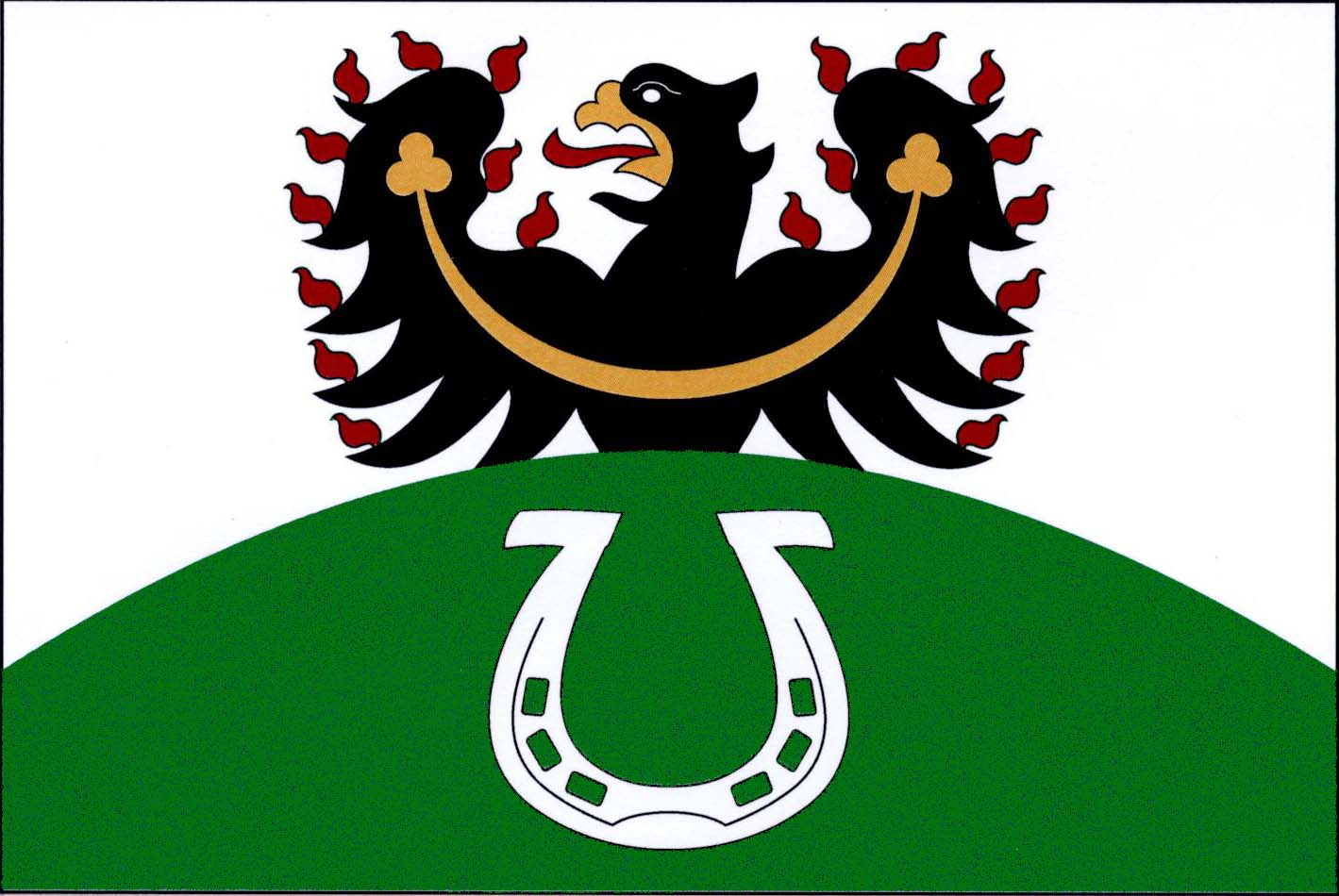
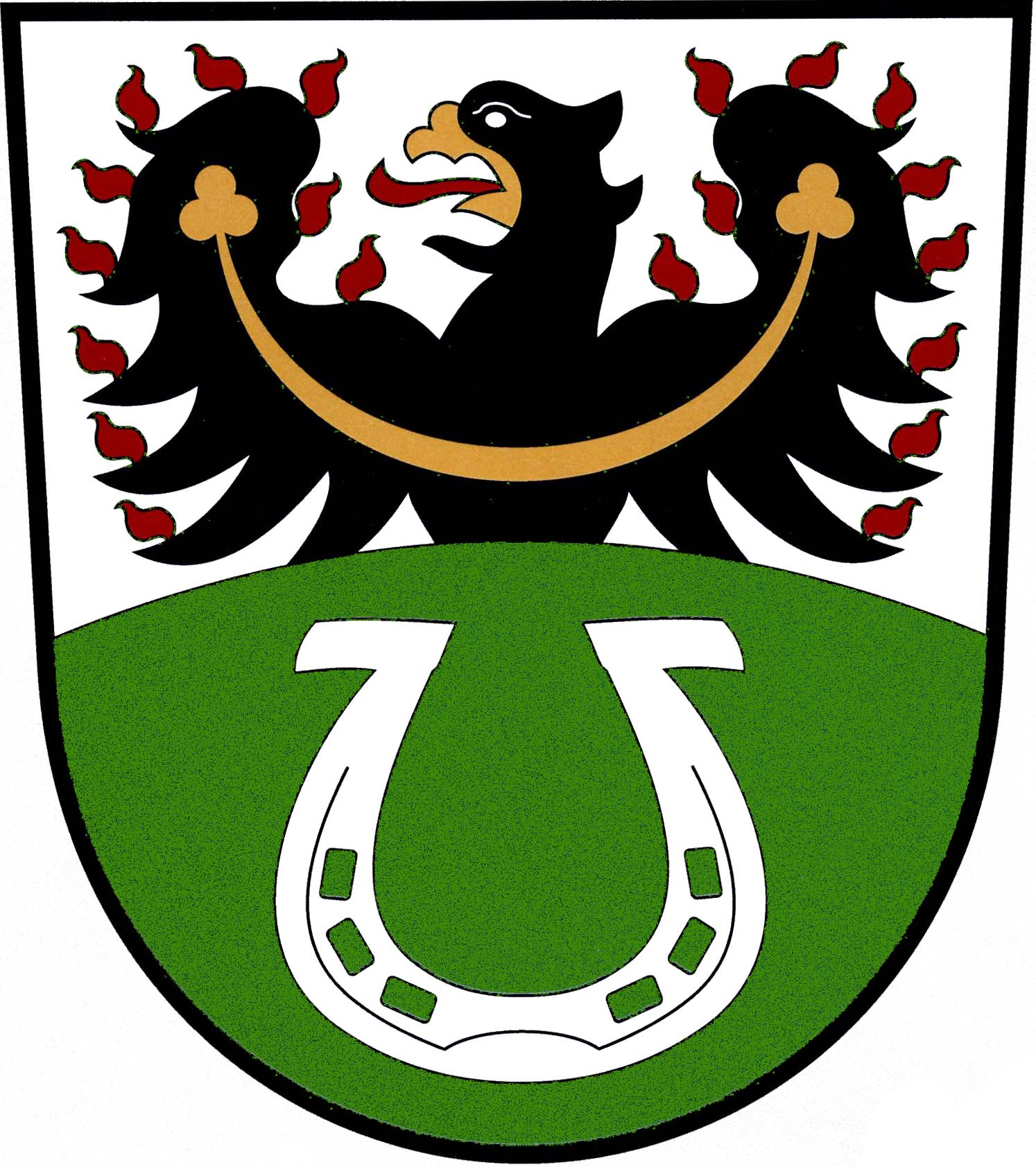
- Flag Coat of arms

- Location in the Czech Republic
- Coordinates: 49°4′3″N 14°31′14″E
- Country: Czech Republic
- Region: South Bohemian
- District: České Budějovice
- First mentioned: 1378

Area
  - Total: 5.19 km^{2} (2.00 sq mi)
- Elevation: 523 m (1,716 ft)

Population (2026-01-01)
  - Total: 262
  - Density: 50.5/km^{2} (131/sq mi)
- Time zone: UTC+1 (CET)
  - Summer (DST): UTC+2 (CEST)
- Postal code: 373 62
- Website: www.chotycany.cz

Chotýčany (German: Schmiedgraben) is a municipality and village in České Budějovice District in the South Bohemian Region of the Czech Republic. It has about 300 inhabitants.

== Etymology ==
According to one theory, the name was derived from the personal name Chotík, meaning "the village of Chotík's people".

== Geography ==
Chotýčany is located about 10 kilometres (6 mi) north of České Budějovice. Most of the municipality lies in the Tábor Uplands, only the southeastern part extends into the Třeboň Basin. The highest point is the hill Na Čihadle at 544 m (1,785 ft) above sea level.

== History ==
The first written mention of Chotýčany is in a deed of King Charles IV from 1378.

== Demographics ==
Historical population

| Year | Pop. | ±% |
|---|---|---|
| 1869 | 241 | — |
| 1880 | 273 | +13.3% |
| 1890 | 260 | −4.8% |
| 1900 | 260 | +0.0% |
| 1910 | 260 | +0.0% |

| Year | Pop. | ±% |
|---|---|---|
| 1921 | 263 | +1.2% |
| 1930 | 268 | +1.9% |
| 1950 | 216 | −19.4% |
| 1961 | 240 | +11.1% |
| 1970 | 224 | −6.7% |

| Year | Pop. | ±% |
|---|---|---|
| 1980 | 231 | +3.1% |
| 1991 | 208 | −10.0% |
| 2001 | 219 | +5.3% |
| 2011 | 222 | +1.4% |
| 2021 | 276 | +24.3% |

Source: Censuses

== Transport ==
The D3 motorway (part of the European route E55) from Prague to České Budějovice runs through the municipality.

Chotýčany railway station is located on the line České Budějovice–Veselí nad Lužnicí, which further continues to Tábor or to Jindřichův Hradec.

== Sights ==
The main historical landmark in the municipality is the former inn. It was built at the end of the 16th century or at the beginning of the 17th century and served as an inn until 1973. It is a regionally significant Renaissance building. The sgraffito decoration of the façade has been preserved.
