= Dolní Dvořiště =

- Municipality
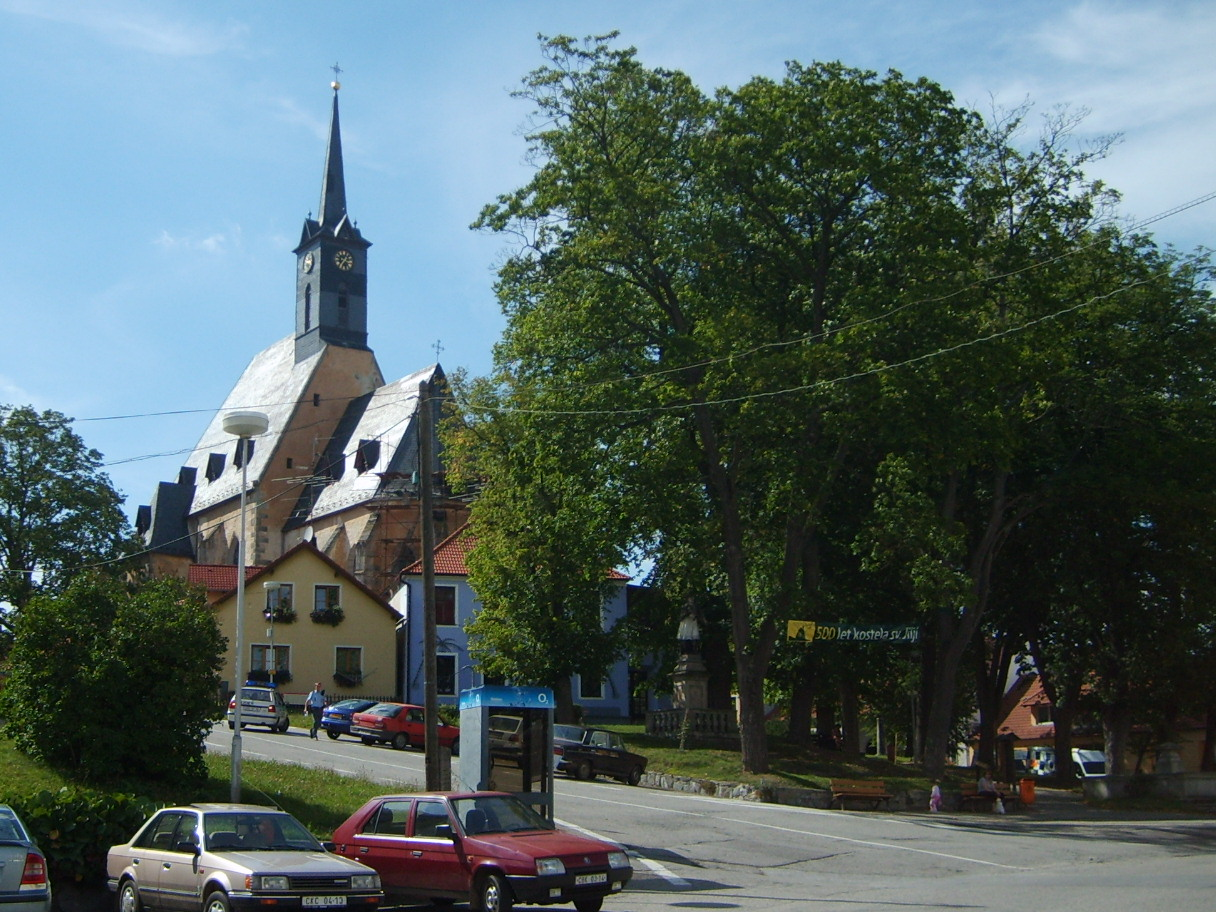
- The square with Church of Saint Giles

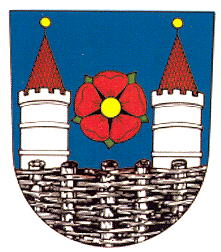
- Flag Coat of arms

- Location in the Czech Republic
- Coordinates: 48°39′23″N 14°27′8″E
- Country: Czech Republic
- Region: South Bohemian
- District: Český Krumlov
- First mentioned: 1279

Area
  - Total: 89.97 km^{2} (34.74 sq mi)
- Elevation: 618 m (2,028 ft)

Population (2026-01-01)
  - Total: 1,408
  - Density: 15.65/km^{2} (40.53/sq mi)
- Time zone: UTC+1 (CET)
  - Summer (DST): UTC+2 (CEST)
- Postal code: 382 72
- Website: www.dolnidvoriste.cz

Dolní Dvořiště (German: Unterhaid) is a municipality and village in Český Krumlov District in the South Bohemian Region of the Czech Republic. It has about 1,400 inhabitants.

== Administrative division ==
Dolní Dvořiště consists of eight municipal parts (in brackets population according to the 2021 census):

- Dolní Dvořiště (807)
- Budákov (1)
- Jenín (17)
- Rybník (63)
- Rychnov nad Malší (231)
- Tichá (78)
- Trojany (94)
- Všeměřice (11)

== Etymology ==
The German name Haid means 'pine forest'. The Latin name Merica, which appears in the oldest documents, is a translation of the German name. From the 14th century, the Czech name Dvořiště appears (derived from the word dvůr, i.e. 'court'). The prefix Dolní in Czech and Unter- in German means 'lower' and served to distinguish it from the nearby village with the same name.

== Geography ==
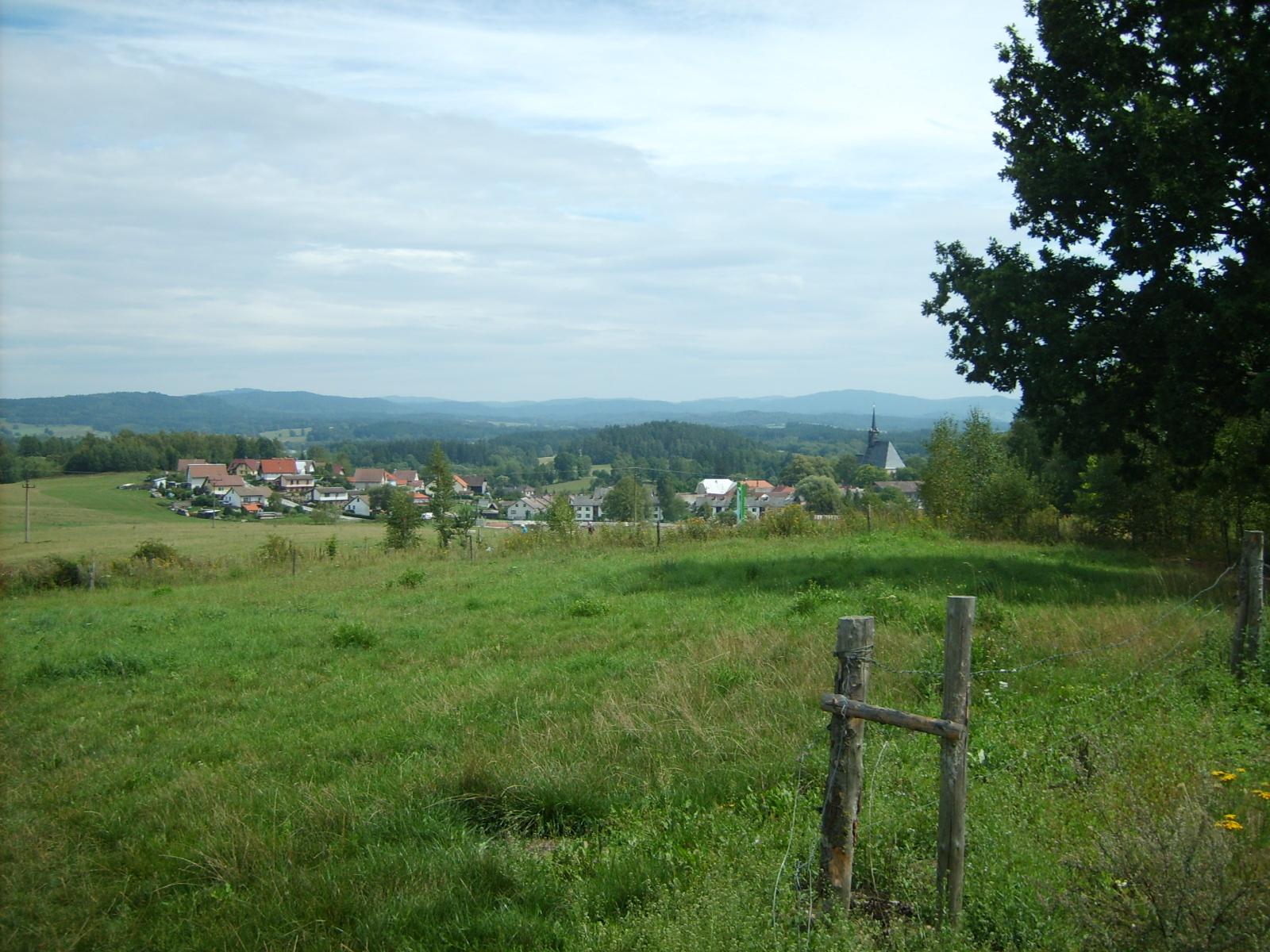
View from the west

Dolní Dvořiště is located about 20 kilometres (12 mi) southeast of Český Krumlov and 34 km (21 mi) south of České Budějovice, on the border with Austria. The municipal territory lies mostly in the Gratzen Foothills, but it also extends to the Bohemian Forest Foothills in the west and to the Gratzen Mountains in the east. The highest point is the mountain Žibřidovský vrch at 870 m (2,854 ft) above sea level.

The Malše River forms part of the Austrian–Czech border and then flows across the municipal territory. There are several fishponds in the territory.

== History ==
The first written mention of Dolní Dvořiště is from 1279, when it was a hamlet on a trade route from Bohemia to Upper Austria. Until the late 1360s, the village was probably part of the Pořešín estate. Then it became property of the Rosenberg family and was promoted to a market town. After the Battle of White Mountain, General Charles Bonaventure, Count of Bucquoy acquired Dolní Dvořiště. His family owned it until the establishment of an independent municipality in 1848.

== Demographics ==
Historical population

Year	Pop.	±%
1869	5,259	—
1880	5,167	−1.7%
1890	5,013	−3.0%
1900	4,857	−3.1%
1910	5,082	+4.6%

Year	Pop.	±%
1921	4,812	−5.3%
1930	4,607	−4.3%
1950	1,244	−73.0%
1961	1,150	−7.6%
1970	1,110	−3.5%

Year	Pop.	±%
1980	1,165	+5.0%
1991	1,210	+3.9%
2001	1,281	+5.9%
2011	1,254	−2.1%
2021	1,302	+3.8%

Source: Censuses

== Transport ==
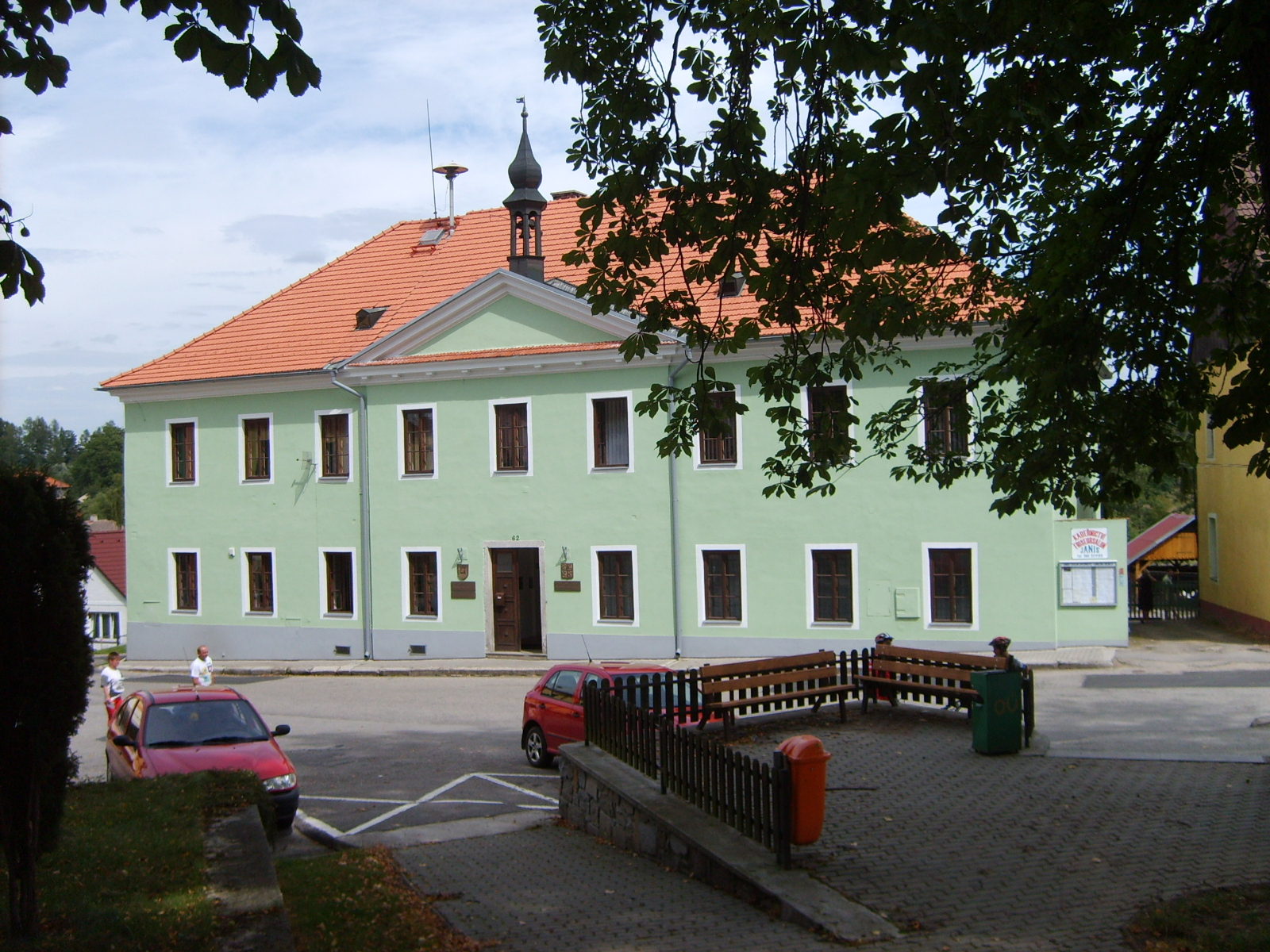
Municipal office

Dolní Dvořiště is situated at the I/3 road (part of the European route E55), which is one of the most important links between the Czech Republic and Austria. The construction of the D3 motorway is planned, connecting the municipality with Prague and České Budějovice.

In addition to four pedestrian border crossings with Austria, the Dolní Dvořiště / Wullowitz road border crossing is located in the municipality.

In Rybník is a railway station on the main line Prague–Linz. In addition, the local line to Lipno nad Vltavou starts here.

== Sights ==
The most important monument in Dolní Dvořiště is the Church of Saint Giles. It was built in the Gothic style in the 1480s.
