= Chotoviny =

- Municipality
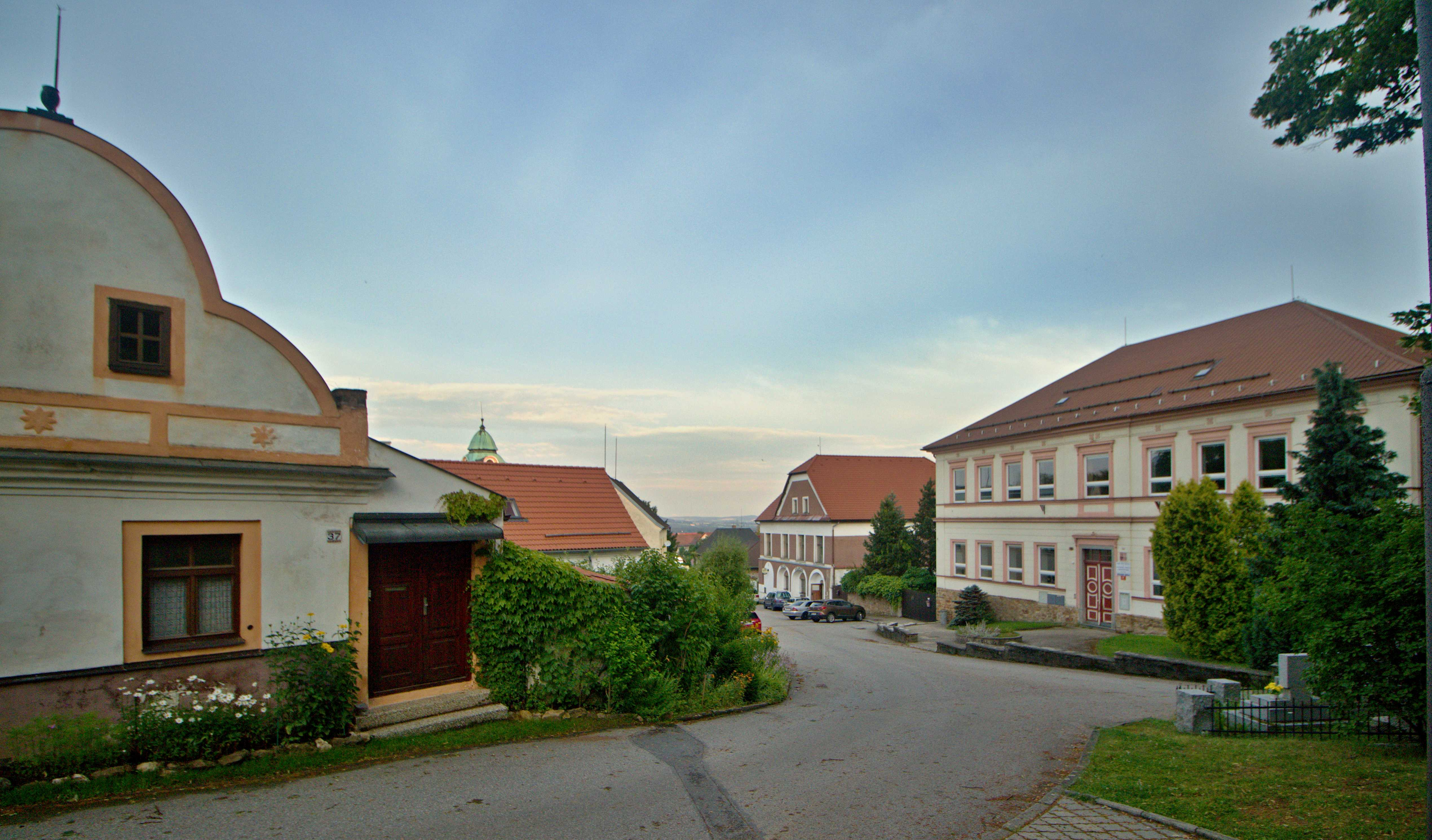
- View from the church

- Flag Coat of arms

- Location in the Czech Republic
- Coordinates: 49°28′50″N 14°41′1″E
- Country: Czech Republic
- Region: South Bohemian
- District: Tábor
- First mentioned: 1266

Area
  - Total: 31.39 km^{2} (12.12 sq mi)
- Elevation: 538 m (1,765 ft)

Population (2026-01-01)
  - Total: 1,909
  - Density: 60.82/km^{2} (157.5/sq mi)
- Time zone: UTC+1 (CET)
  - Summer (DST): UTC+2 (CEST)
- Postal code: 391 37
- Website: www.chotoviny.cz

Chotoviny is a municipality and village in Tábor District in the South Bohemian Region of the Czech Republic. It has about 1,900 inhabitants.

== Administrative division ==
Chotoviny consists of 12 municipal parts (in brackets population according to the 2021 census):

- Chotoviny (833)
- Beranova Lhota (35)
- Broučkova Lhota (28)
- Červené Záhoří (554)
- Jeníčkova Lhota (112)
- Liderovice (16)
- Moraveč (58)
- Polánka (15)
- Řevnov (60)
- Rzavá (11)
- Sedlečko (55)
- Vrážná (24)

== Etymology ==
The name Chotoviny is derived from the personal name Chot, specifically from the expression Chotovy (chalupy), meaning "Chot's (cottages)".

== Geography ==
Chotoviny is located about 7 kilometres (4 mi) north of Tábor and 57 km (35 mi) north of České Budějovice. It lies mostly in the Vlašim Uplands. The southern part of the municipal territory lies in the Tábor Uplands. The highest point is at 565 m (1,854 ft) above sea level. There are several small fishponds in the municipality.

== History ==
The first written mention of Chotoviny is from 1266. Existence of a fortress in Chotoviny is documented in 1407. From 1856 to 1871, the railway from Prague to Vienna through Chotoviny was built.

== Demographics ==
Historical population

Year	Pop.	±%
1869	2,425	—
1880	2,565	+5.8%
1890	2,578	+0.5%
1900	2,448	−5.0%
1910	2,279	−6.9%

Year	Pop.	±%
1921	2,161	−5.2%
1930	2,047	−5.3%
1950	1,652	−19.3%
1961	1,705	+3.2%
1970	1,571	−7.9%

Year	Pop.	±%
1980	1,537	−2.2%
1991	1,512	−1.6%
2001	1,525	+0.9%
2011	1,686	+10.6%
2021	1,801	+6.8%

Source: Censuses

== Transport ==
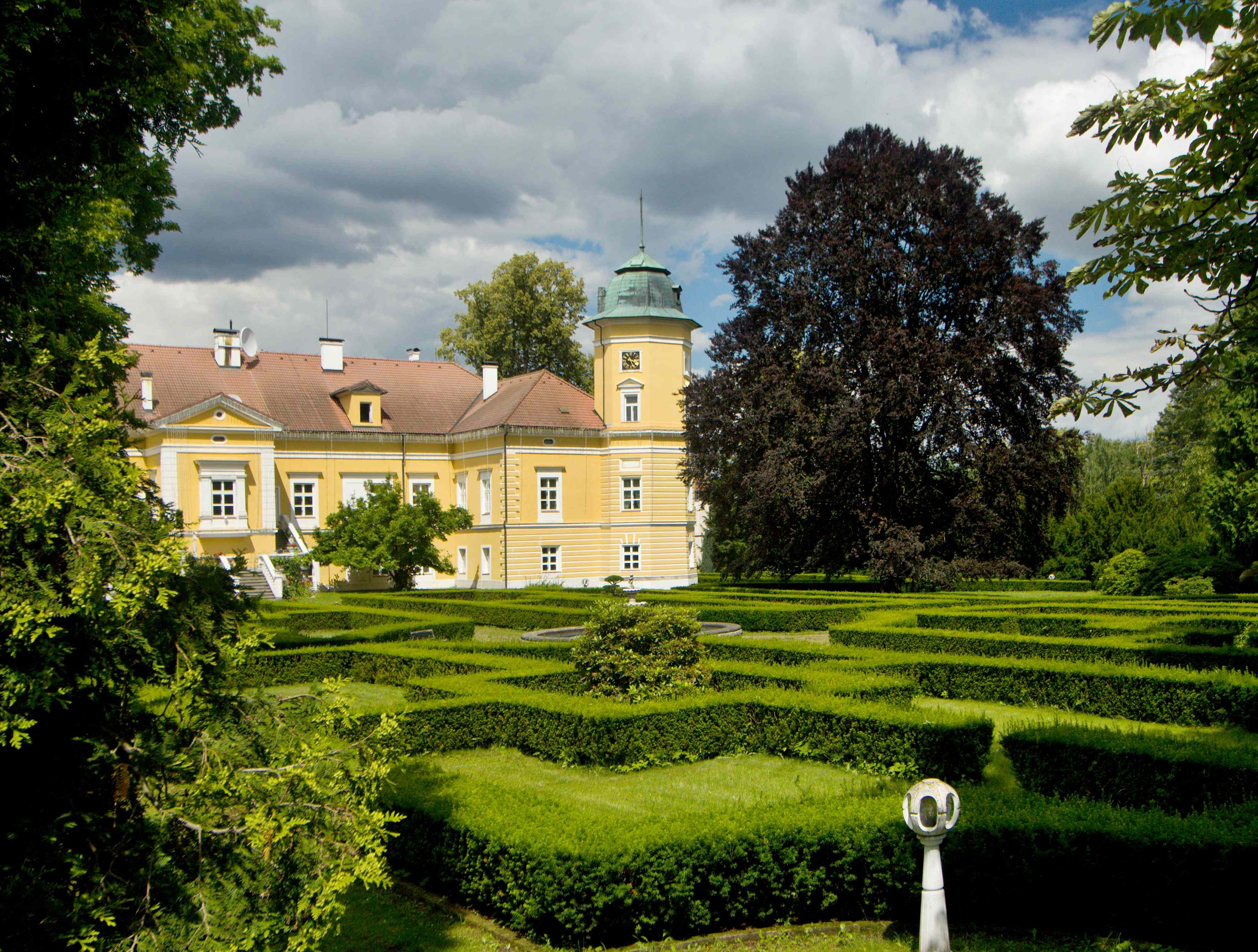
Chotoviny Castle

The D3 motorway (part of the European route E55) runs through the municipality.

Chotoviny is located on the railway line Tábor–Olbramovice and is the starting point of a line to České Budějovice.

== Sights ==
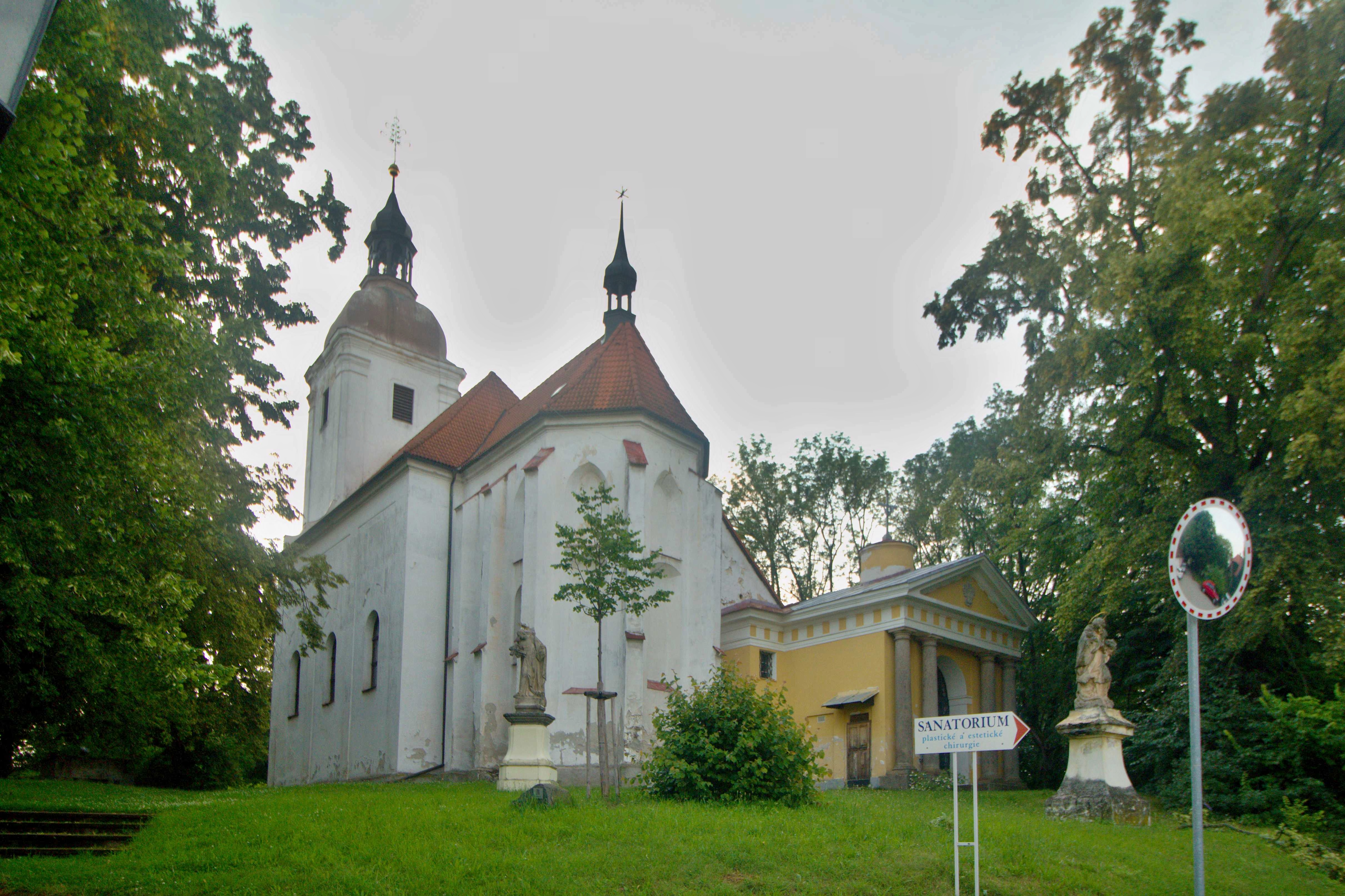
Church of Saints Peter and Paul with the tomb

In 1770–1780, the fortress in Chotoviny was rebuilt to a Neoclassical castle. In the 19th century, it was reconstructed to its present Neo-Renaissance form and the adjacent castle park with an area of 22.5 hectares (56 acres) was founded. The park is dendrologically valuable.

A church was probably founded here already between 990 and 1000. The Church of Saints Peter and Paul was built originally in the Gothic style and was rebuilt in 1781–1786, when the Empire tomb of the Nádherný noble family in the style of a Doric temple was added.
