= Střítež (Český Krumlov District) =

- Municipality
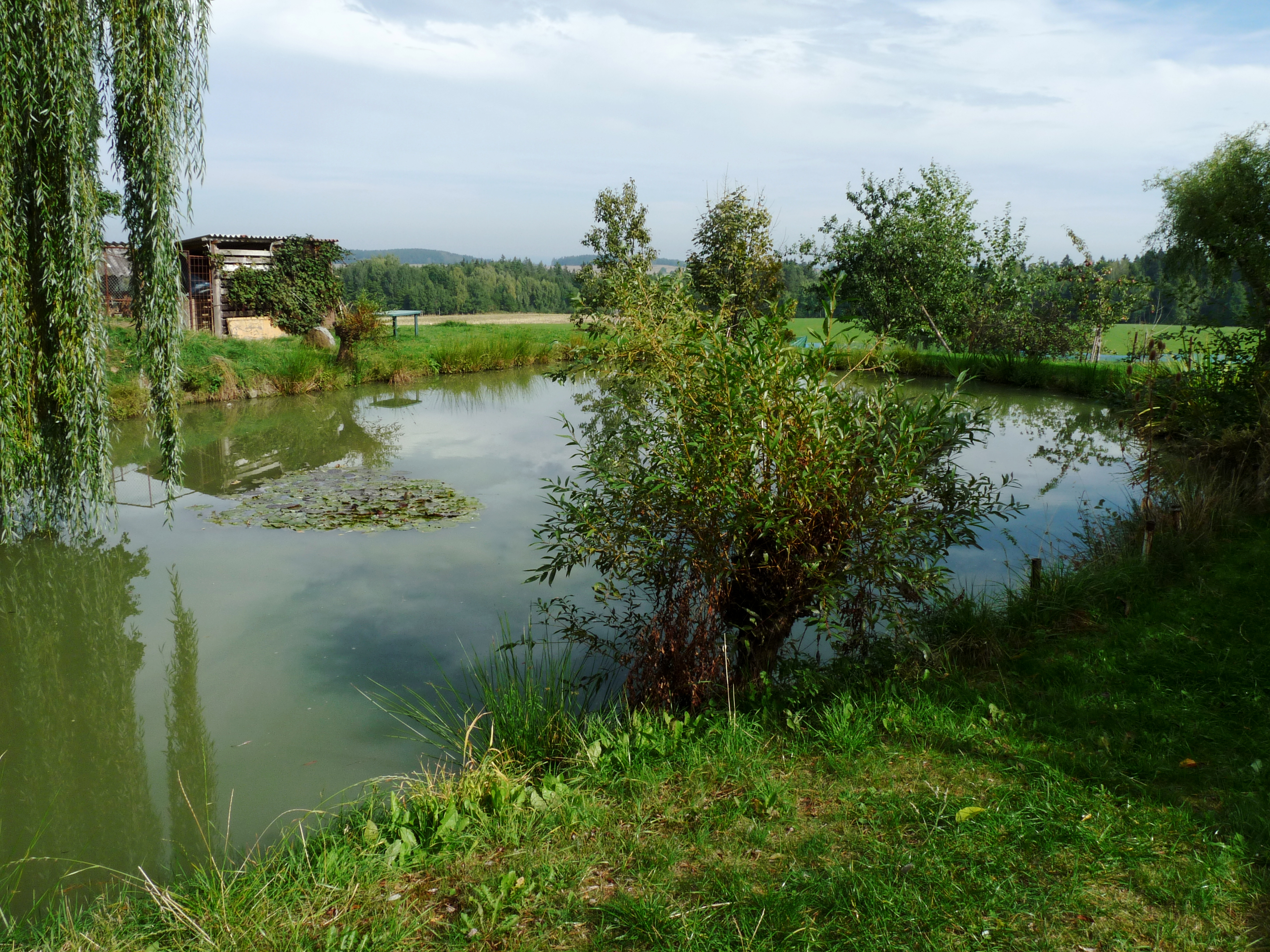
- A pond in Střítež

- Location in the Czech Republic
- Coordinates: 48°46′33″N 14°26′4″E
- Country: Czech Republic
- Region: South Bohemian
- District: Český Krumlov
- First mentioned: 1358

Area
  - Total: 8.38 km^{2} (3.24 sq mi)
- Elevation: 675 m (2,215 ft)

Population (2026-01-01)
  - Total: 407
  - Density: 48.6/km^{2} (126/sq mi)
- Time zone: UTC+1 (CET)
  - Summer (DST): UTC+2 (CEST)
- Postal codes: 382 32, 382 41, 382 42
- Website: www.info-stritez.cz

Střítež is a municipality and village in Český Krumlov District in the South Bohemian Region of the Czech Republic. It has about 400 inhabitants.

Střítež lies approximately 12 kilometres (7 mi) south-east of Český Krumlov, 24 km (15 mi) south of České Budějovice, and 148 km (92 mi) south of Prague.

== Administrative division ==
Střítež consists of three municipal parts (in brackets population according to the 2021 census):

- Střítež (58)
- Kaplice-nádraží (204)
- Raveň (125)

== Demographics ==
Historical population
| Year | Pop. | ±% |
|---|---|---|
| 1869 | 367 | — |
| 1880 | 377 | +2.7% |
| 1890 | 338 | −10.3% |
| 1900 | 409 | +21.0% |
| 1910 | 423 | +3.4% |
| 1921 | 305 | −27.9% |
| 1930 | 508 | +66.6% |
| 1950 | 146 | −71.3% |
| 1961 | 165 | +13.0% |
| 1970 | 321 | +94.5% |
| 1980 | 375 | +16.8% |
| 1991 | 328 | −12.5% |
| 2001 | 332 | +1.2% |
| 2011 | 444 | +33.7% |
| 2021 | 387 | −12.8% |
Source: Censuses
