= Mezno =

- Municipality
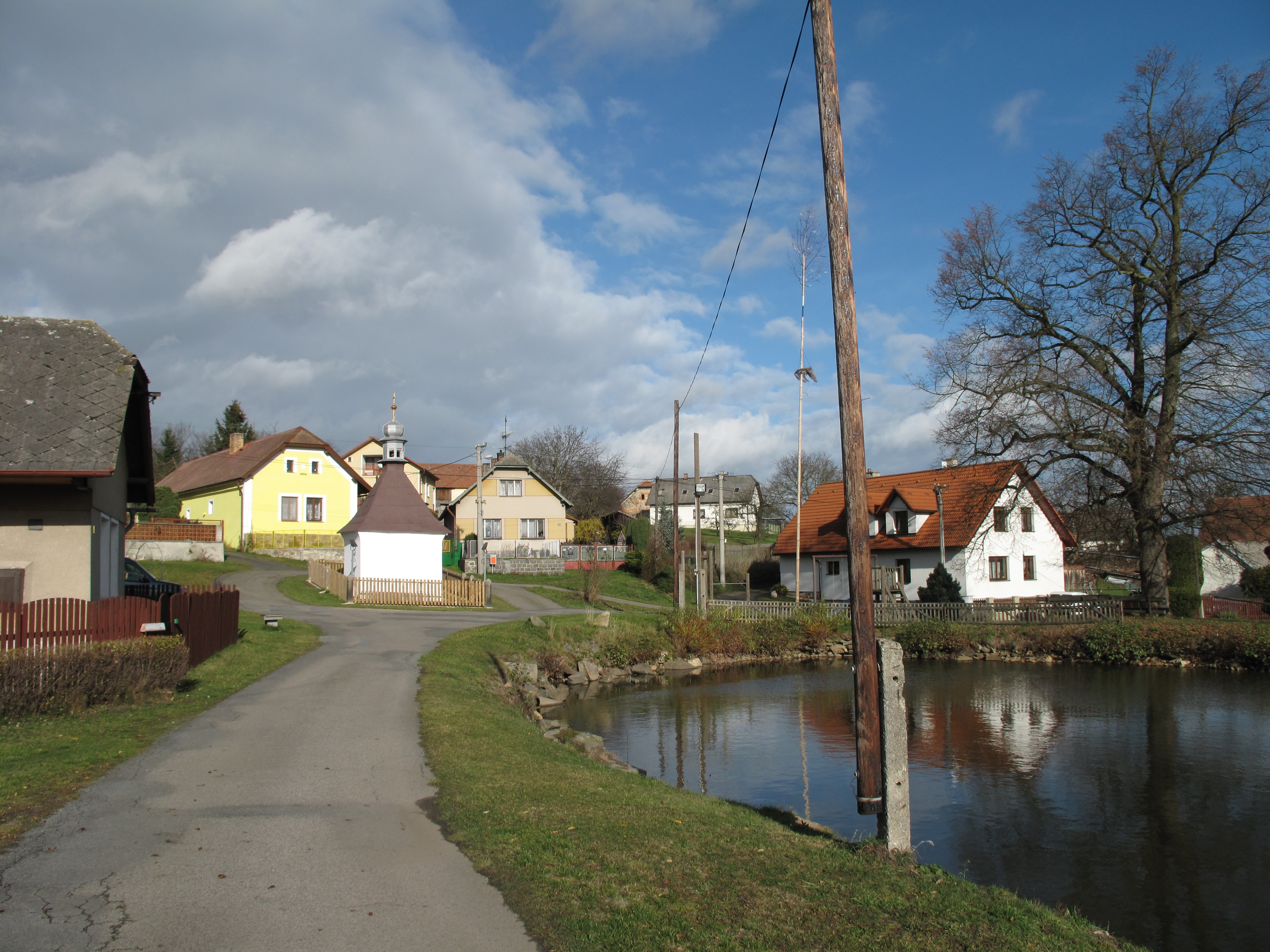
- Lažany, a part of Mezno

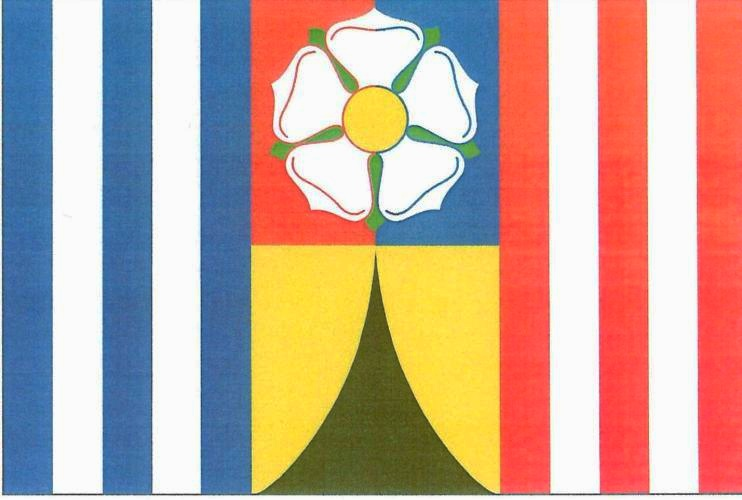
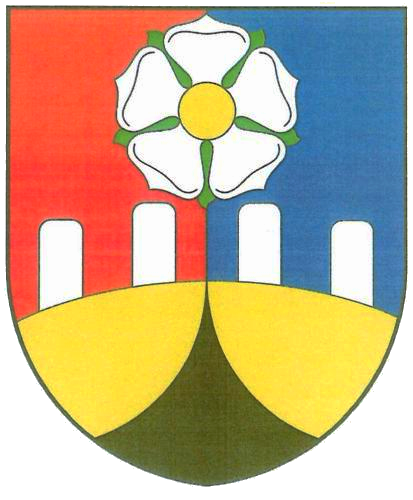
- Flag Coat of arms

- Location in the Czech Republic
- Coordinates: 49°32′5″N 14°38′42″E
- Country: Czech Republic
- Region: Central Bohemian
- District: Benešov
- First mentioned: 1469

Area
  - Total: 15.63 km^{2} (6.03 sq mi)
- Elevation: 559 m (1,834 ft)

Population (2026-01-01)
  - Total: 378
  - Density: 24.2/km^{2} (62.6/sq mi)
- Time zone: UTC+1 (CET)
  - Summer (DST): UTC+2 (CEST)
- Postal code: 257 86
- Website: www.mezno.cz

Mezno is a municipality and village in Benešov District in the Central Bohemian Region of the Czech Republic. It has about 400 inhabitants.

== Administrative division ==
Mezno consists of five municipal parts (in brackets population according to the 2021 census):

- Mezno (211)
- Lažany (35)
- Mitrovice (99)
- Stupčice (21)
- Vestec (3)

== Demographics ==
Historical population
Year	Pop.	±%
1869	1,178	—
1880	1,005	−14.7%
1890	896	−10.8%
1900	909	+1.5%
1910	904	−0.6%
1921	960	+6.2%
1930	929	−3.2%
1950	763	−17.9%
1961	623	−18.3%
1970	585	−6.1%
1980	508	−13.2%
1991	420	−17.3%
2001	369	−12.1%
2011	346	−6.2%
2021	369	+6.6%
Source: Censuses
