= Kaplice =

- Town
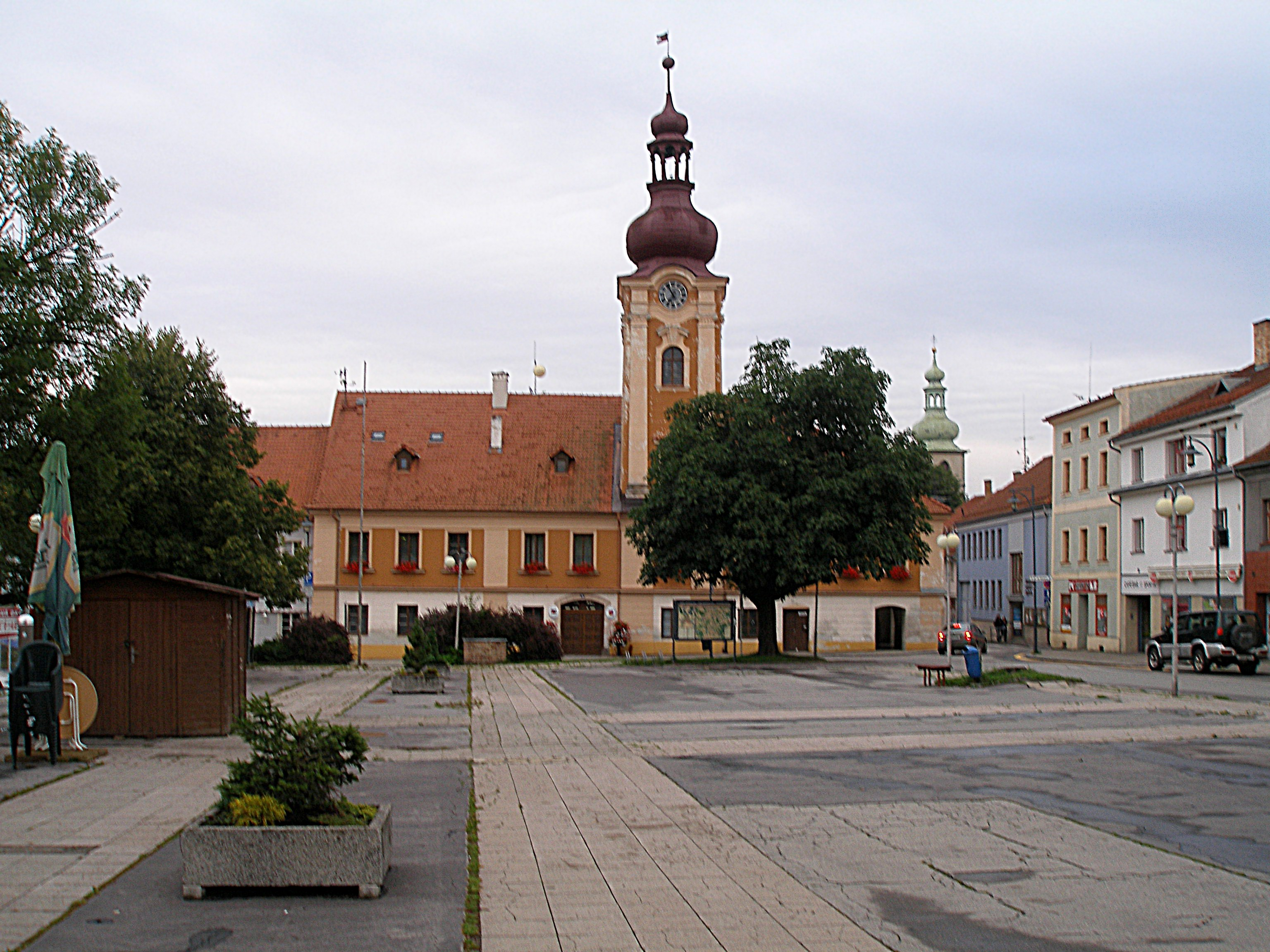
- Town hall on the town square

- Flag Coat of arms

- Location in the Czech Republic
- Coordinates: 48°44′19″N 14°29′47″E
- Country: Czech Republic
- Region: South Bohemian
- District: Český Krumlov
- First mentioned: 1257

Government
  - Mayor: Libor Lukš

Area
  - Total: 40.85 km^{2} (15.77 sq mi)
- Elevation: 537 m (1,762 ft)

Population (2026-01-01)
  - Total: 7,547
  - Density: 184.7/km^{2} (478.5/sq mi)
- Time zone: UTC+1 (CET)
  - Summer (DST): UTC+2 (CEST)
- Postal code: 382 41
- Website: www.mestokaplice.cz

Kaplice (Czech pronunciation: [ˈkaplɪtsɛ]; German: Kaplitz) is a town in Český Krumlov District in the South Bohemian Region of the Czech Republic. It has about 7,500 inhabitants. The town is located on the Malše River.

Kaplice became a town in 1382. The historic town centre is well preserved and is protected as an urban monument zone.

== Administrative division ==
Kaplice consists of 11 municipal parts (in brackets population according to the 2021 census):

- Kaplice (6,019)
- Blansko (378)
- Dobechov (15)
- Hradiště (45)
- Hubenov (109)
- Květoňov (8)
- Mostky (72)
- Pořešín (163)
- Pořešínec (40)
- Rozpoutí (68)
- Žďár (77)

== Etymology ==
The name of the town is a diminutive of the Czech word kaple ('chapel').

== Geography ==
Kaplice is located about 15 kilometres (9 mi) southeast of Český Krumlov and 25 km (16 mi) south of České Budějovice. It lies in the Gratzen Foothills. The highest point is the hill Hradišťský vrch at 780 m (2,560 ft) above sea level. The Malše River flows through the town. There are several fishponds in the municipal territory.

== History ==
=== Middle Ages ===
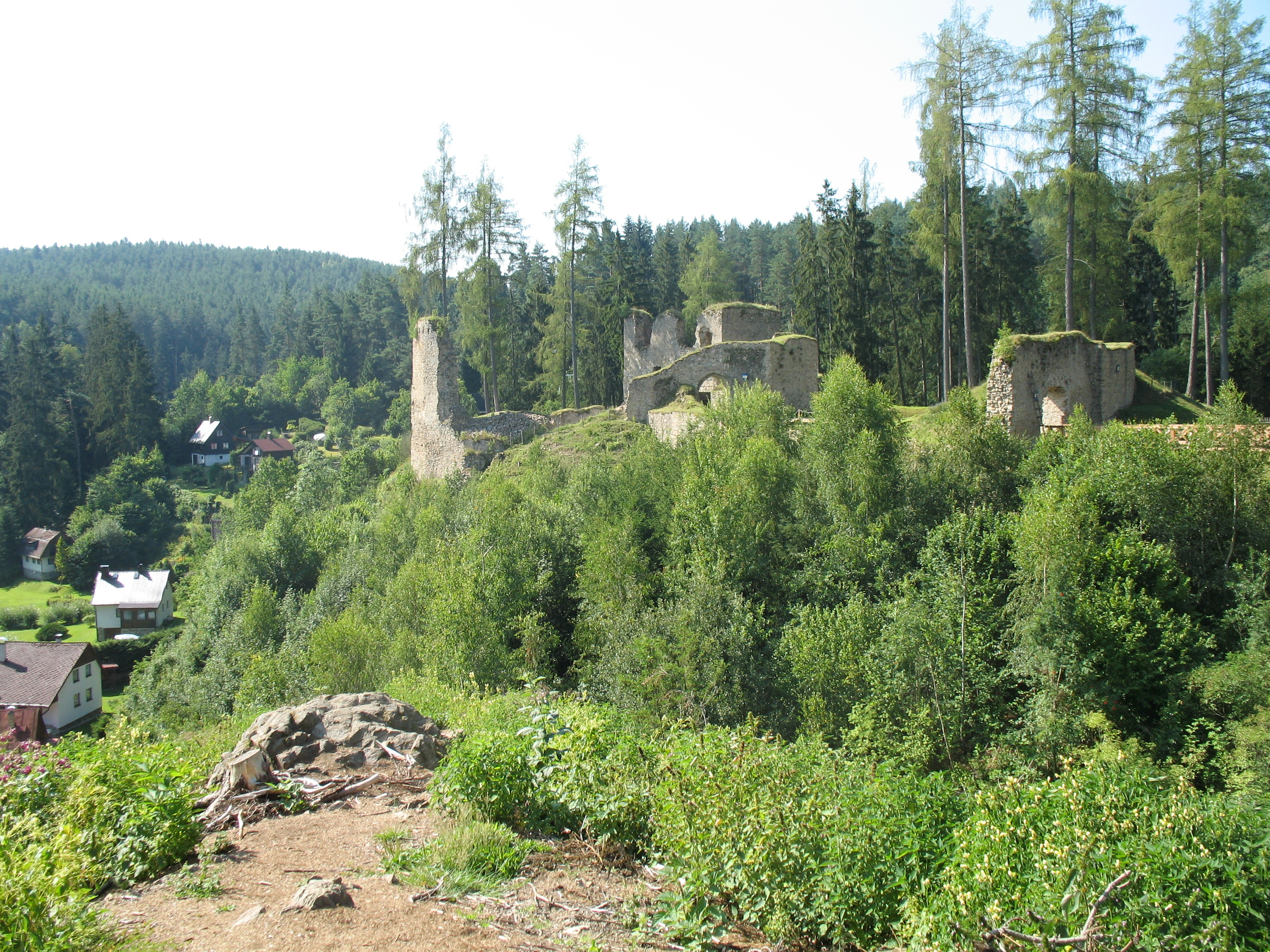
Ruin of Pořešín Castle

The first written mention of Kaplice is in a deed of Pope Alexander IV from 1257, according to which it was property of the monastery in Milevsko. It was founded as the market village on an important trade route, connecting Upper Austria with South Bohemia. The advantageous position was the main factor of its rapid development.

In the 13th century, it became a part of the Pořešín estate, founded by Bavors of Strakonice. In 1382, Kaplice became a town with all the town privileges, but remained under the influence of lords of Pořešín until 1387.

After both Kaplice and Pořešín were acquired by Oldřich II of Rosenberg, he let the Pořešín Castle burn down in 1434, so that he would not have to invest in it and pay for servants. By the end of the 15th century, the town population had become German-speaking.

After the Rosenbergs died out, the estate was inherited by the Schwambergs, then it was acquired by Charles Bonaventure, Count of Bucquoy. The town obtained a number of privileges which positively influenced its economic development. Nevertheless, this development had many times in the past been seriously afflicted with such catastrophes as frequent fires, desolation and robberies during the wars, especially during the Thirty Years' War.

=== Austrian monarchy ===
After the abolition of serfdom, the town became the seat of the political and judicial district in the new administrative system. Until 1918, the town was part of Austria-Hungary. Co-existence of the German-speaking majority with the Czech minority in the town was peaceful and almost without any problem. However, the growth of nationalisms at the end of the 19th century, and especially in the first half of the 20th century, raised the first serious conflicts.

=== First Czechoslovak Republic ===
After the end of World War I, Kaplice became part of the First Czechoslovak Republic. Kaplice citizens with German majority refused to recognize the border of the new Czechoslovakia and wanted to join the territory to German-Austria. Their organized armed resistance was suppressed and they did not succeed.

In 1919, Kaplice became the administrative centre of the area which included Vyšší Brod and Nové Hrady, but for its low population it was recognised only as a market town. In 1937, it was again promoted to a town.

During the first republic, Kaplice remained a town with a majority of German inhabitants. In 1938, on the basis of the Munich Agreement, Kaplice were annexed by Nazi Germany and administered as a part of the Reichsgau Oberdonau. The Czech population had to flee.

=== After World War II ===
After the end of World War II, Kaplice fell back again to Czechoslovakia. Former Czech inhabitants returned and the German population was expelled. The town depopulated.

In 1960, Kaplice District was abolished. The town began to develop again in the 1960s. New schools, industrial factories and housing estates were built here and the population increased. In 1994, Střítež separated and became an independent municipality.

== Demographics ==
Historical population

Year	Pop.	±%
1869	3,966	—
1880	3,972	+0.2%
1890	4,004	+0.8%
1900	4,126	+3.0%
1910	4,115	−0.3%

Year	Pop.	±%
1921	4,017	−2.4%
1930	3,759	−6.4%
1950	2,952	−21.5%
1961	3,615	+22.5%
1970	4,308	+19.2%

Year	Pop.	±%
1980	5,402	+25.4%
1991	7,111	+31.6%
2001	7,125	+0.2%
2011	7,183	+0.8%
2021	6,994	−2.6%

Source: Censuses

== Economy ==
The largest employer based in the town is Engel strojírenská, a manufacturer of machines for processing plastics. It employs more than 1,000 people.

== Transport ==
The I/3 road (part of the European route E55), specifically the section from České Budějovice to the Czech–Austrian border in Dolní Dvořiště, runs next to the town.

The Prague–Linz railway line passes through the territory of Kaplice only briefly. The town is served by a railway station called Kaplice, which is located in the territory of neighbouring Střítež.

== Sights ==
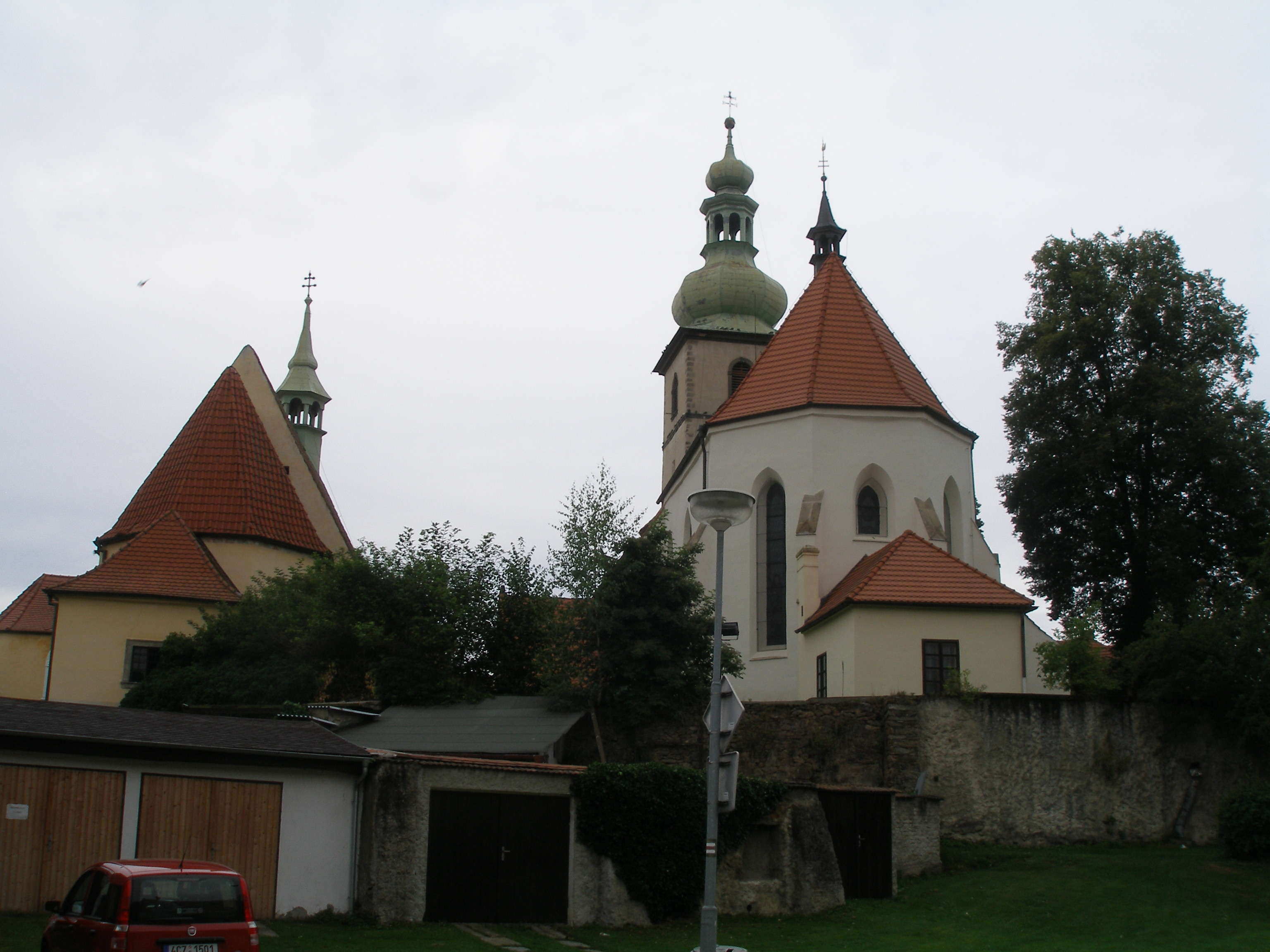
Both neighbouring churches

The oldest buildings in Kaplice are the two churches, which unusually stand side by side. Both are built in the late Gothic style. The Church of Saints Peter and Paul is documented in 1383. The Church of Saint Florian was built in the 1490s and modified in the Baroque style after it was damaged by the 1718 fire.

In the centre of Kaplice is a square called Náměstí. The main landmark of the square is the Renaissance town hall. Its current appearance is from 1852. The tower of the town hall is a remnant of Baroque reconstruction. Other sights on the square include a stone fountain from 1646 with a pillory, a Renaissance house decorated with sgraffito, and a large building of the former brewery with a Renaissance stone bossaged portal.

The ruin of Pořešín Castle is open to the public. It includes a small museum.

== Notable people ==
- David Drahonínský (born 1982), paralympic archer

== Twin towns – sister cities ==
Kaplice is twinned with:

- Freistadt, Austria
