= D3 motorway (Czech Republic) =

Motorway in the Czech Republic

Coordinates: 49°22′47.29″N 14°43′27.32″E

D3 Motorway
- Dálnice D3

Route information
- Part of
- Length: 97.4 km (60.5 mi) Planned: 172 km (107 mi)

Major junctions
- From: D0 in Prague
- To: S10 border with Austria near Dolní Dvořiště

Location
- Country: Czech Republic
- Regions: Central Bohemian, South Bohemian
- Major cities: Tábor, České Budějovice

Highway system
- Highways in the Czech Republic
← D2	→ D4

The D3 motorway (Czech: Dálnice D3) is a motorway in the Czech Republic. Once completed, the 172-kilometre-long (107 mi) motorway will connect Prague with the Austrian Mühlviertel Expressway (S10) to Linz. As of December 2024, only the middle section (97.4 km (60.5 mi)) of the motorway is in operation; namely a section from Mezno to Kaplice-nádraží. A further 15.5 km (9.6 mi) from Kaplice-nádraží to Czech Republic–Austria border is currently under construction. The D3 motorway is part of the European route E55.

The D3 motorway in the South Bohemian Region towards the Austrian border should be completed by 2026. Completion of D3 in the Central Bohemian Region is planned by 2028, however its designed course through the Lower Sázava landscape is still objected and opposed by environmental and citizens associations.

A nationwide trial of variable speeds of up to 150 km/h on the D3 between Tábor and České Budějovice began on October 5, 2025, with factors such as weather conditions and traffic density influencing the maximum speed allowed.

== Chronology ==
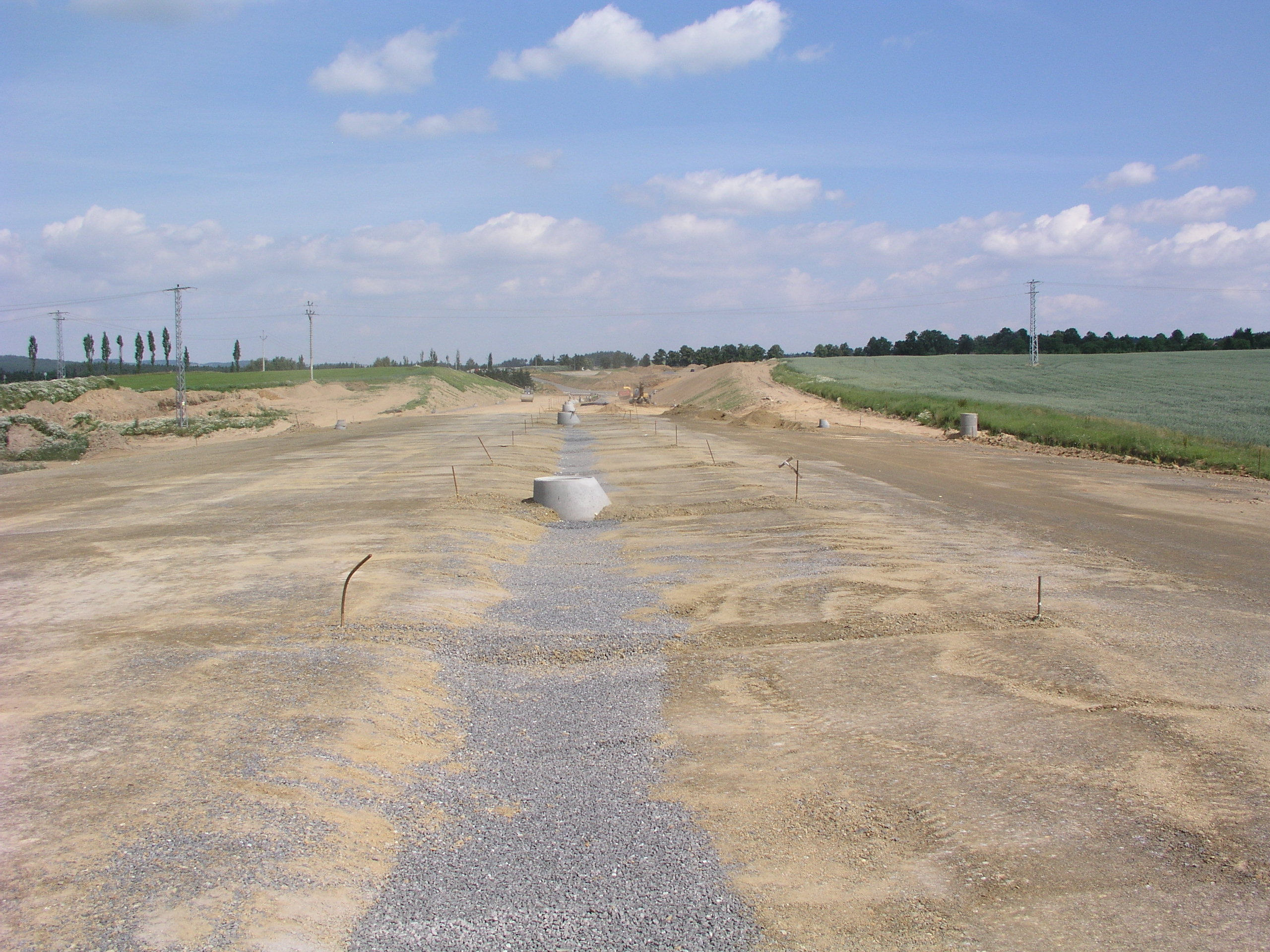
Construction of D3 near Chotoviny

The construction of the motorway has been planned since 1987. In 1988, the D3 was started with the construction of the Tábor bypass, which, however, was not designated as a motorway. By Government Resolution No. 741 of July 1999, it was included in the motorway network.

In October 2004, the first 8.3-kilometre-long (5.2 mi) long section Chotoviny–Čekanice was put into operation. The Mezno–Chotoviny section was under construction since 2005 and was put into operation on 17 December 2007.

In 2008, the construction of the 25.0-kilometre-long (15.5 mi) long section Tábor–Veselí nad Lužnicí was started, which was put into operation on 28 June 2013. At the same time, sections from the 1980s and 1990s between Stoklasná Lhota and Měšice were reconstructed. The Tábor bypass was then redesignated as a motorway, leaving a short 400 metre section undesignated until 2024.

A 24.0-kilometre-long (14.9 mi) section from Dolní Třebonín to the border with Austria on the other side of the future S10 expressway was initially planned to be built as an expressway (Czech: rychlostní silnice) as well, however on 31 December 2015, the category of expressways (R) was abolished in the Czech Republic, so since then, it is now counted as part of the D3 motorway.

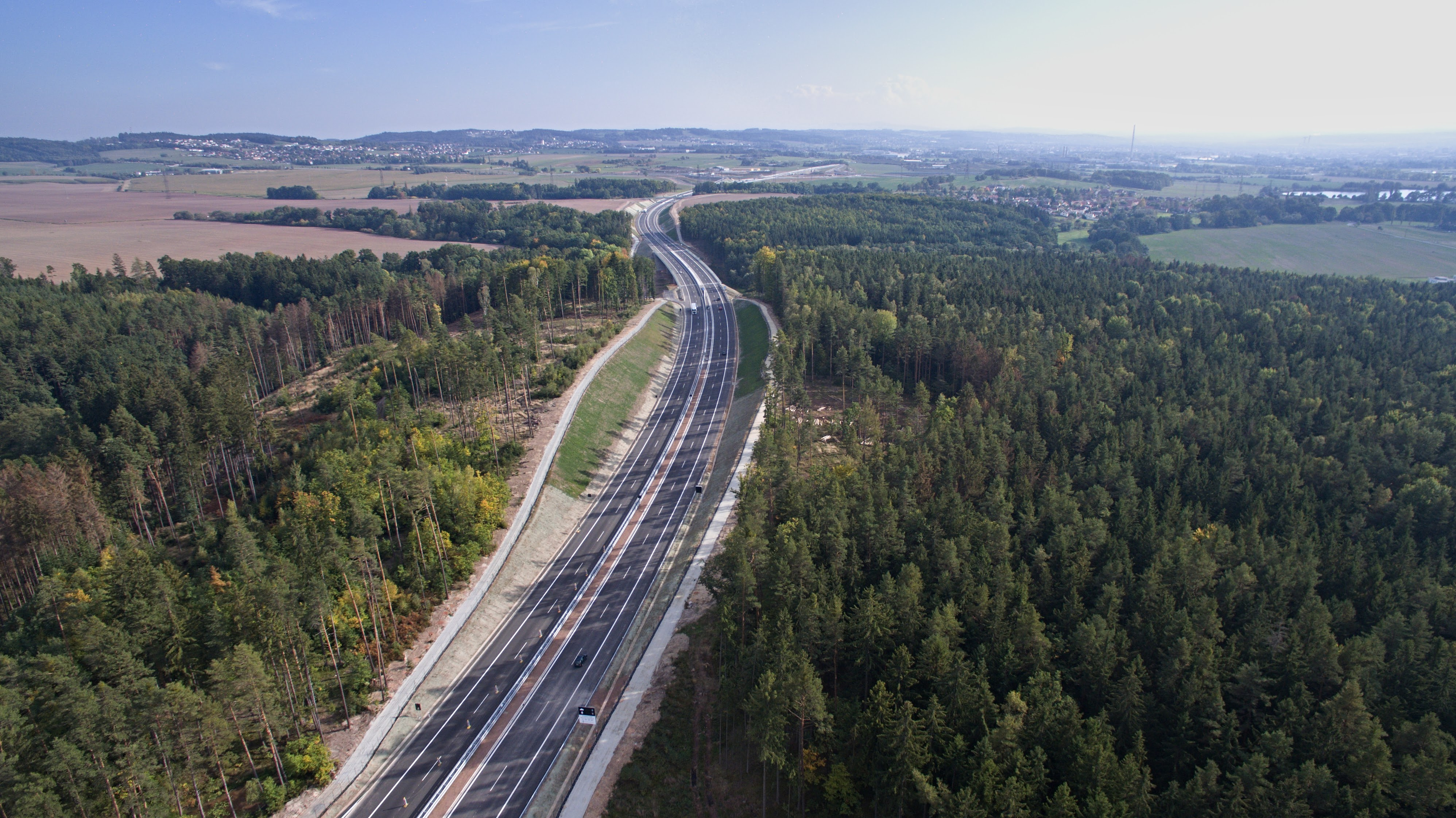
D3 motorway near České Budějovice

On 7 April 2017, the 5.22-kilometre-long (3.24 mi) section on the Veselí nad Lužnicí–Bošilec section was opened, which was completed from a half profile to a full motorway profile. The cost of this construction was CZK 635 million (excluding VAT). The opening ceremonies of these two sections cost the Regional Directorate of Transport a total of CZK 420,000, for which it was criticised.

A 3.16-kilometre-long (1.96 mi) section near České Budějovice was opened on 27 September 2017. The construction of this section cost CZK 720 million (excluding VAT) with cost mounting for construction of the grade-separated ring intersection.

In June 2024, ŘSD managed to start the completion of about 400 metres of the right-hand lane of the D3 motorway on the Tábor bypass, after obtaining a valid construction permit. Traffic there had been restricted due to a quarter-century-long dispute with the access to the motorway. The section became fully operational in August 2024.

On 21 December 2024, České Budějovice bypass (from Úsilný to Kaplice-Nádraží) was put into operation, marking the first time 111 kilometres (69 mi) of motorway opened in the Czech Republic in one calendar year.

=== Future development ===
The 12 kilometres (7.5 mi) long section Kaplice-nádraží – Nažidla is under construction since June 2024, and is planned to open in 2026. The 3.5 kilometres (2.2 mi) section between Nažidla and the state border with Austria is in construction since January 2024, and planned for opening in 2026.

The northern segments between Prague and Mezno; at a total length of around 58 kilometres (36 mi) are planned to start construction in 2027, and planned to be put into operation by 2031.

== Route description ==
Country	Region	Location	km	mi	Exit	Name	Destinations	Notes
Czech Republic	Central Bohemian Region	Central Bohemian Region			—	Mezno	I/3	Kilometrage starting point the previous sections are in preparation, without an approved planning decision yet Start of the toll section
Czech Republic	Central Bohemian Region	Central Bohemian Region			Rest area	Odpočívka Mezno		
Czech Republic	South Bohemian Region	South Bohemian Region	70	43	—	Chotoviny		
Czech Republic	South Bohemian Region	South Bohemian Region	76	47	—	Čekanice		
Czech Republic	South Bohemian Region	South Bohemian Region	79	49	—	Měšice		
Czech Republic	South Bohemian Region	South Bohemian Region	84	52	—	Planá nad Lužnicí		Start of the variable speed limit up to 150 km/h
Czech Republic	South Bohemian Region	South Bohemian Region	95	59	—	Soběslav		
Czech Republic	South Bohemian Region	South Bohemian Region	100	62	—	Dráchov		
Czech Republic	South Bohemian Region	South Bohemian Region	104	65	—	Veselí nad Lužnicí-sever		
Czech Republic	South Bohemian Region	South Bohemian Region	107	66	—	Veselí nad Lužnicí-jih	I/24	
Czech Republic	South Bohemian Region	South Bohemian Region	118	73	—	Ševětín		
Czech Republic	South Bohemian Region	South Bohemian Region			Rest area	Odpočívka Chotýčany		
Czech Republic	South Bohemian Region	South Bohemian Region	125	78	—	Lhotice		
Czech Republic	South Bohemian Region	South Bohemian Region	130	81	—	Úsilné	I/34 E49 E551	End of the variable speed limit up to 150 km/h
Czech Republic	South Bohemian Region	South Bohemian Region	136	85	—	Pohůrka		
Czech Republic	South Bohemian Region	South Bohemian Region	141	88	—	Roudne		
Czech Republic	South Bohemian Region	South Bohemian Region	147	91	—	Krasejovka		
Czech Republic	South Bohemian Region	South Bohemian Region	150	93	—	Dolní Třebonín	I/39	
Czech Republic	South Bohemian Region	South Bohemian Region	159	99	—	Kaplice-Nádraží		
Czech Republic	South Bohemian Region	South Bohemian Region	165	103	—	Kaplice		
Czech Republic	South Bohemian Region	South Bohemian Region			Rest area	Odpočívka Suchdol		
Czech Republic	South Bohemian Region	South Bohemian Region	174	108	—	Dolní Dvořiště		
Czech Republic	South Bohemian Region	South Bohemian Region	175	109	—	Dolní Dvořiště/Wullowitz border crossing	S 10 E55	Kilometrage end point Border with Austria; road continues as the planned Austrian S10.
1.000 mi = 1.609 km; 1.000 km = 0.621 mi: Route transition; Unopened

== Gallery ==
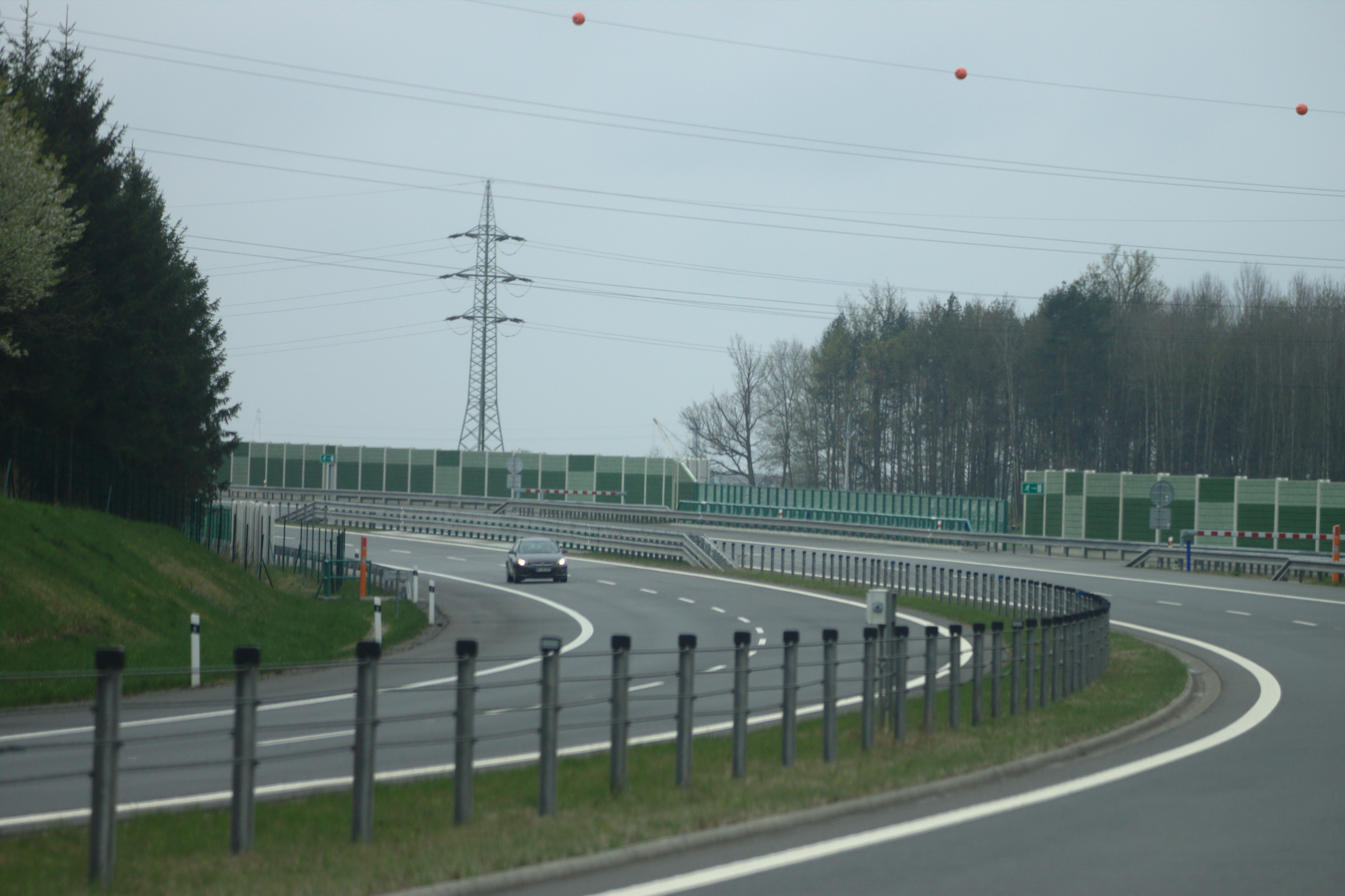
D3 motorway near Planá nad Lužnicí
