= Měšice =

- Municipality
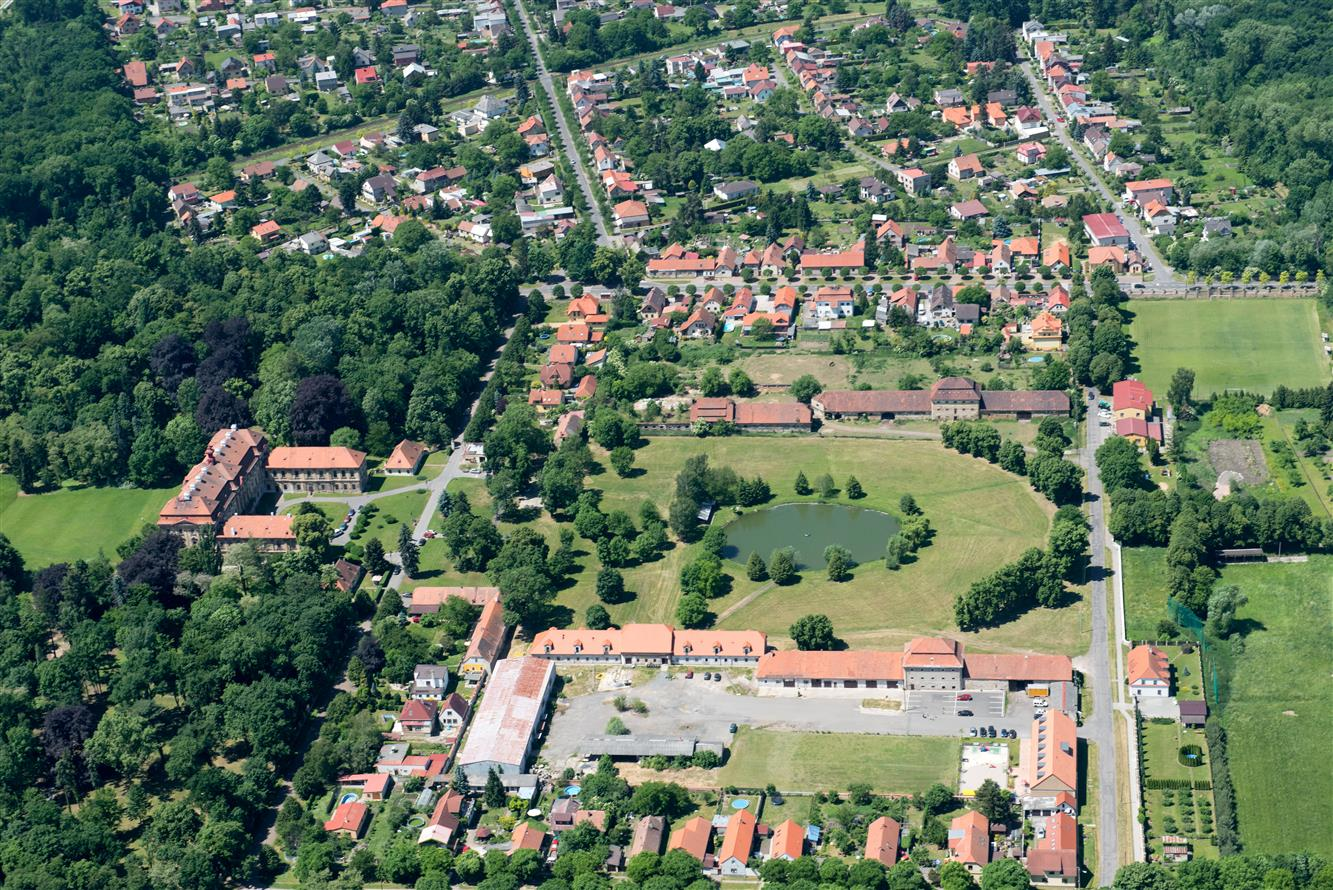
- Aerial view of Měšice

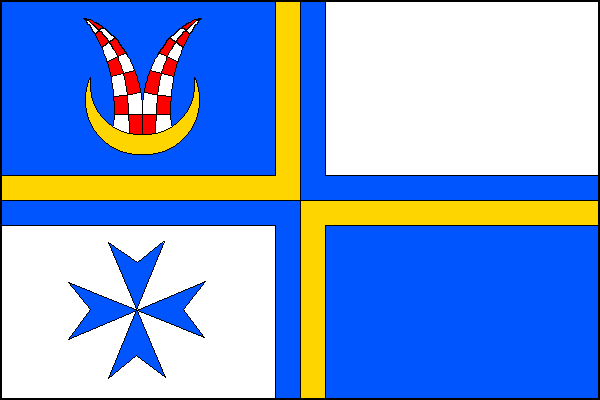
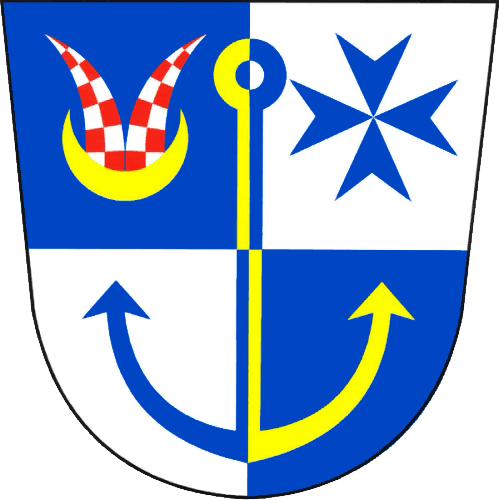
- Flag Coat of arms

- Location in the Czech Republic
- Coordinates: 50°11′53″N 14°31′12″E
- Country: Czech Republic
- Region: Central Bohemian
- District: Prague-East
- First mentioned: 1294

Area
  - Total: 4.43 km^{2} (1.71 sq mi)
- Elevation: 203 m (666 ft)

Population (2026-01-01)
  - Total: 2,211
  - Density: 499/km^{2} (1,290/sq mi)
- Time zone: UTC+1 (CET)
  - Summer (DST): UTC+2 (CEST)
- Postal code: 250 64
- Website: www.mesice.cz

Měšice is a municipality and village in Prague-East District in the Central Bohemian Region of the Czech Republic. It has about 2,200 inhabitants.

== Etymology ==
The name is derived from the personal name Měch, meaning "the village of Měch's people".

== Geography ==
Měšice is located about 9 kilometres (6 mi) north of Prague. It lies in a flat landscape in the Central Elbe Table. The stream Líbeznický potok flows through the municipality and supplies two fishponds in the centre of Měšice.

== History ==
The first written mention of Měšice is from 1294. In 1434, a stone fortress was built here. The Měšice Castle was built in 1767–1775. In 1871–1872, the railway to Všetaty was built, but the connection with Prague was not finished until 1888.

== Demographics ==
Historical population

Year	Pop.	±%
1869	299	—
1880	412	+37.8%
1890	511	+24.0%
1900	534	+4.5%
1910	535	+0.2%

Year	Pop.	±%
1921	468	−12.5%
1930	746	+59.4%
1950	763	+2.3%
1961	804	+5.4%
1970	737	−8.3%

Year	Pop.	±%
1980	911	+23.6%
1991	916	+0.5%
2001	993	+8.4%
2011	1,879	+89.2%
2021	2,147	+14.3%

Source: Censuses

== Transport ==
Měšice is located on the railway lines Prague–Mělník and Prague–Mladá Boleslav.

== Sights ==
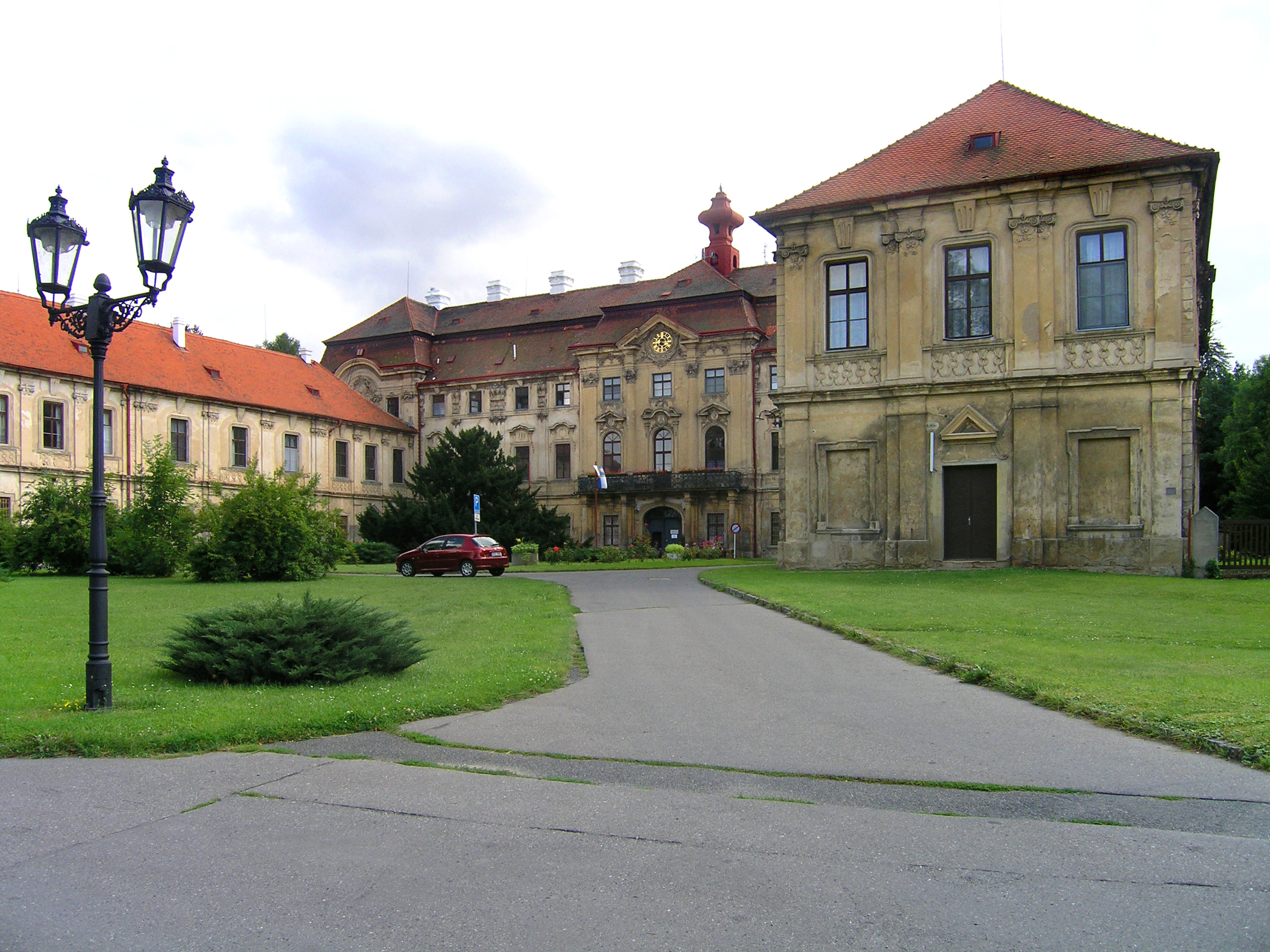
Měšice Castle

The Měšice Castle is the main landmark of Měšice. It is built in the Rococo style with Neoclassical elements and contains remarkable sculptural and painterly decoration. It includes an English landscape garden with rare trees and the oldest lightning rod in Bohemia, which was installed in 1775. Today a private medical facility (Centre of Integrated Oncological Care) resides there.
