= Horní Stropnice =

- Municipality
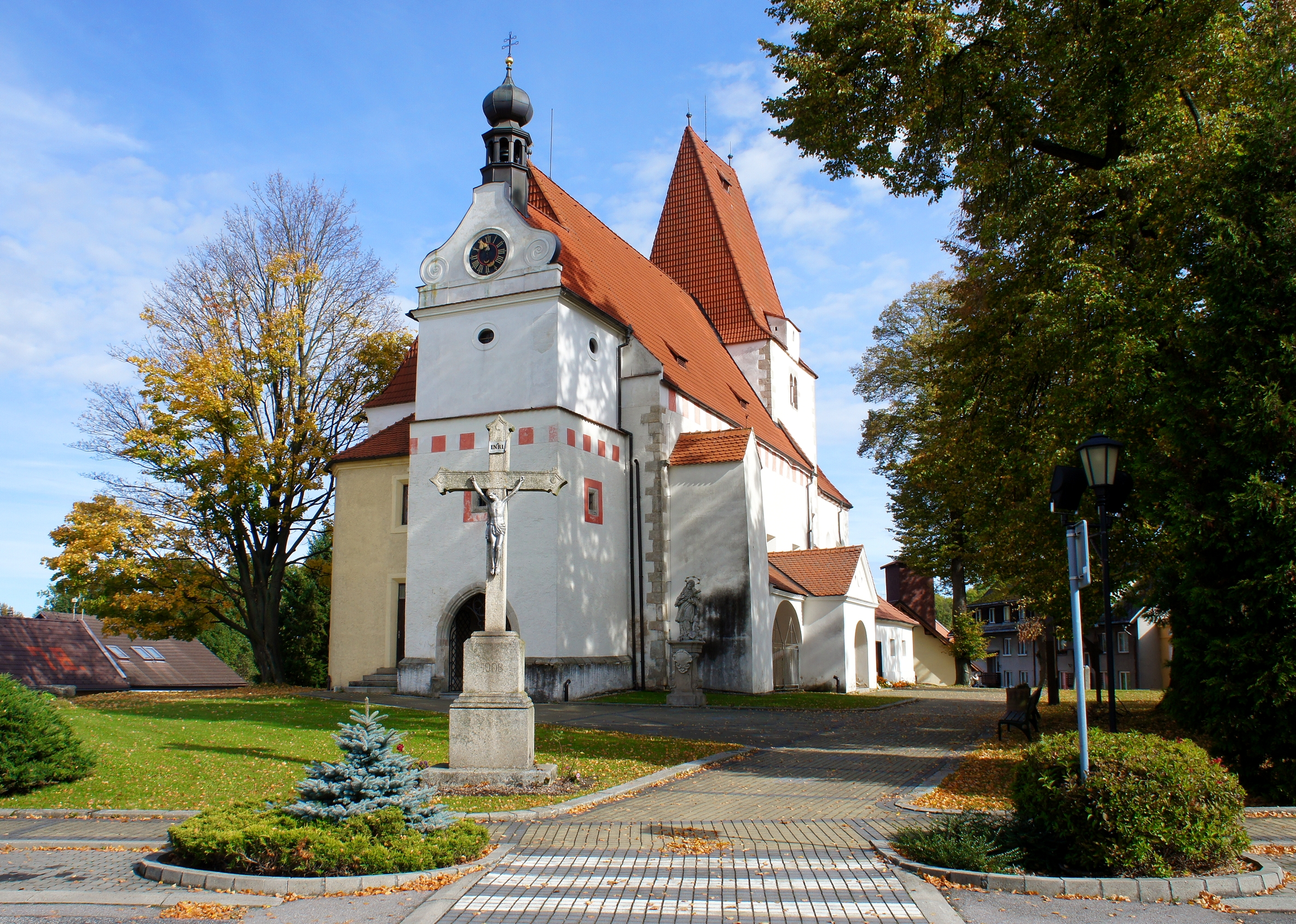
- Church of Saint Nicholas

- Flag Coat of arms

- Location in the Czech Republic
- Coordinates: 48°45′41″N 14°44′6″E
- Country: Czech Republic
- Region: South Bohemian
- District: České Budějovice
- First mentioned: 1185

Area
  - Total: 79.90 km^{2} (30.85 sq mi)
- Elevation: 543 m (1,781 ft)

Population (2026-01-01)
  - Total: 1,485
  - Density: 18.59/km^{2} (48.14/sq mi)
- Time zone: UTC+1 (CET)
  - Summer (DST): UTC+2 (CEST)
- Postal code: 373 35
- Website: www.horni-stropnice.cz

Horní Stropnice (until 1950 Stropnice; German: Strobnitz) is a municipality and village in České Budějovice District in the South Bohemian Region of the Czech Republic. It has about 1,500 inhabitants.

== Administrative division ==
Horní Stropnice consists of 21 municipal parts (in brackets population according to the 2021 census):

- Horní Stropnice (837)
- Bedřichov (21)
- Chlupatá Ves (15)
- Dlouhá Stropnice (56)
- Dobrá Voda (56)
- Hlinov (2)
- Hojná Voda (34)
- Humenice (30)
- Konratice (8)
- Krčín (0)
- Meziluží (4)
- Olbramov (47)
- Paseky (5)
- Rychnov u Nových Hradů (202)
- Šejby (11)
- Staré Hutě (11)
- Střeziměřice (9)
- Svébohy (43)
- Světví (69)
- Vesce (4)
- Vyhlídky (3)

== Etymology ==
Stropnice and Dlouhá Stropnice ('long Stropnice') were named after the river Stropnice. In 1950, the name was changed from Stropnice to Horní Stropnice ('upper Stropnice') to distinguish it from another village called Stropnice in the same region (now Dolní Stropnice, part of Římov).

== Geography ==
Horní Stropnice is located about 29 kilometres (18 mi) southeast of České Budějovice. The municipal territory borders Austria in the south. The northern part of the municipal territory lies in the Gratzen Foothills. The southern part lies in the Gratzen Mountains and includes the highest point of Horní Stropnice, the Vysoká mountain at 1,034 m (3,392 ft) above sea level. The Stropnice River flows through the municipality. The municipal territory is rich in fishponds.

== History ==
The first written mention of Stropnice is from 1185. From 1302 to World War II, the settlement had the status of a market town. Until 1359, the owners of Stropnice frequently changed. From 1359 to 1611, it was a property of the Rosenberg family as part of the Nové Hrady estate. From 1620 until the establishment of an independent municipality in 1849, Stropnice and the entire Nové Hrady estate were owned by the Lords of Bucquoy.

== Demographics ==
Historical population

Year	Pop.	±%
1869	6,317	—
1880	6,336	+0.3%
1890	6,151	−2.9%
1900	6,054	−1.6%
1910	6,026	−0.5%

Year	Pop.	±%
1921	5,470	−9.2%
1930	4,892	−10.6%
1950	1,869	−61.8%
1961	1,928	+3.2%
1970	1,726	−10.5%

Year	Pop.	±%
1980	1,597	−7.5%
1991	1,522	−4.7%
2001	1,548	+1.7%
2011	1,510	−2.5%
2021	1,467	−2.8%

Source: Censuses

== Transport ==
There are no railways or major roads passing through the municipality.

== Sights ==
The main landmark of Horní Stropnice is the Church of Saint Nicholas. The originally Romanesque church dates from the first half of the 13th century. It was rebuilt in the late Gothic style in 1500–1510, after it was damaged by a fire in 1486, but the oldest Romanesque parts of the church were preserved.

== Notable people ==
- Wenzel Jaksch (1896–1966), German politician
- František Binder (1914–1942), war hero
