= Stropnice =

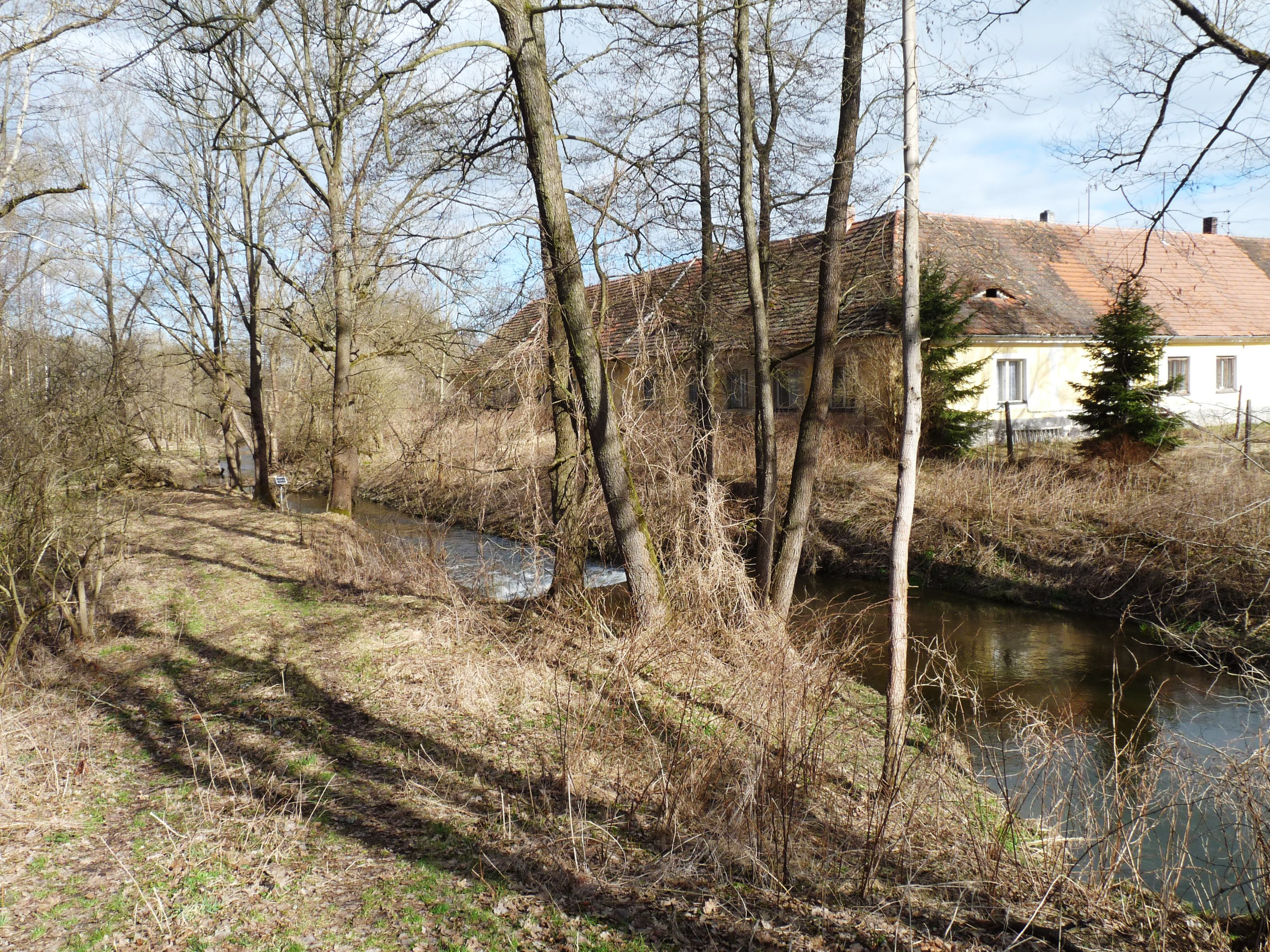
- The Stropnice in Nové Hrady-Byňov

Location
- Countries: Czech Republic; Austria
- Regions/ States: South Bohemian; Lower Austria

Physical characteristics
- Source
  - location: Moorbad Harbach, Gratzen Mountains
  - coordinates: 48°41′57″N 14°45′4″E
  - elevation: 860 m (2,820 ft)
- Mouth
  - location: Malše
  - coordinates: 48°53′0″N 14°30′4″E
  - elevation: 412 m (1,352 ft)
- Length: 58.9 km (36.6 mi)
- Basin size: 402.4 km^{2} (155.4 sq mi)
- Discharge
  - average: 2.45 m^{3}/s (87 cu ft/s) near estuary

Basin features
- Progression: Malše→ Vltava→ Elbe→ North Sea

The Stropnice (Czech pronunciation: [ˈstropɲɪtsɛ]; German: Strobnitz) is a river in the Czech Republic and Austria, a right tributary of the Malše River. It originates in Lower Austria, but quickly leaves the territory of Austria and flows further through the South Bohemian Region. It is 58.9 km (36.6 mi) long.

== Etymology ==
The name is derived from the Slavic word strop. While in modern Czech the word means 'ceiling', its earlier meaning is unclear. According to one theory, it was the name given to the log on which the water wheel rested, and the name could reflect the presence of many watermills on the river. The settlements Stropnice (formerly a market town, today called Horní Stropnice), Dlouhá Stropnice (today part of Horní Stropnice) and Stropnice (today Dolní Stropnice, part of Římov) were named after the river.

== Characteristic ==
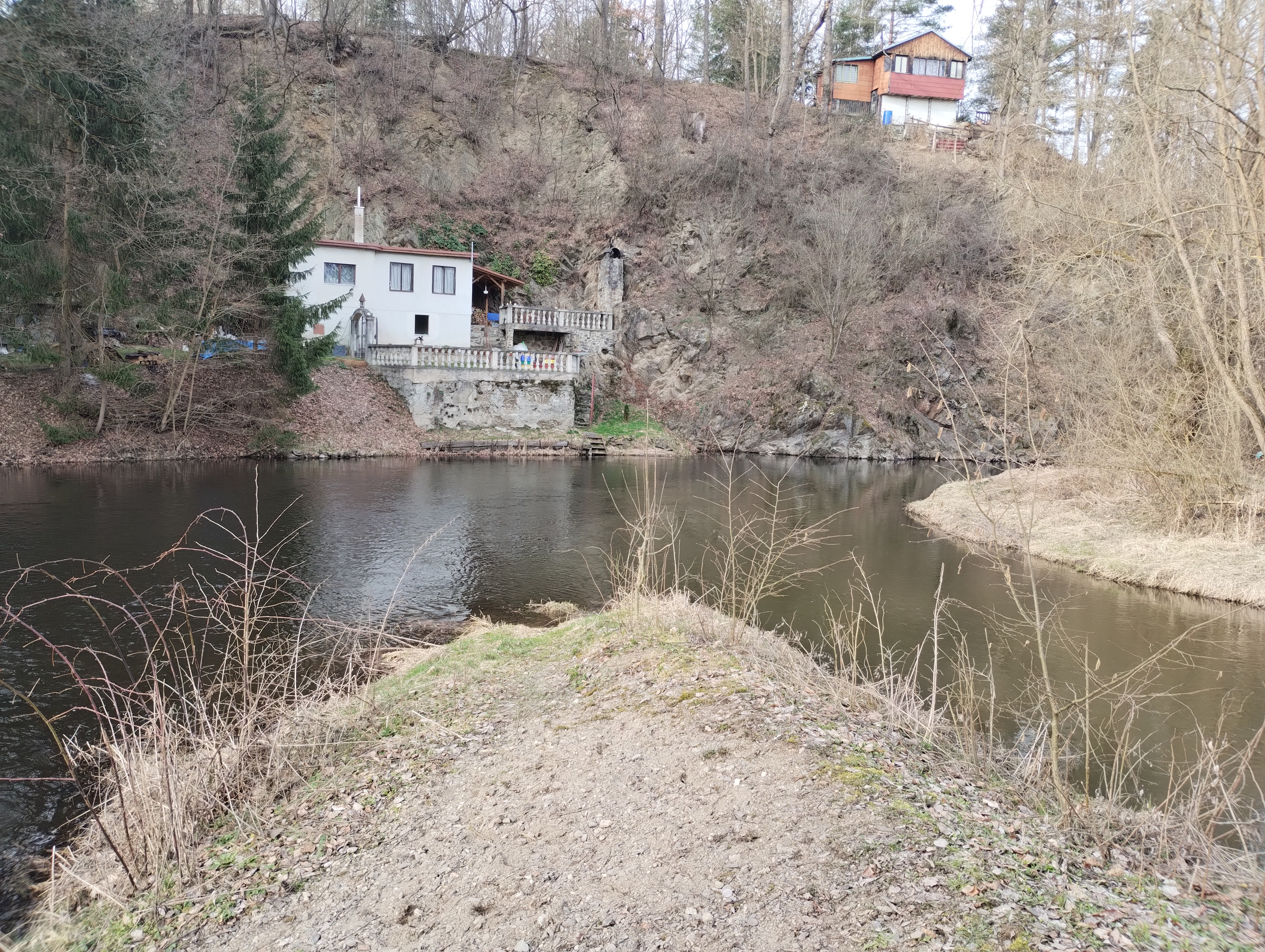
Confluence of the Stropnice (right) and Malše

The Stropnice originates in the territory of Moorbad Harbach in the Gratzen Mountains at an elevation of 860 m (2,820 ft) and flows to Doudleby, where it enters the Malše River at an elevation of 412 m (1,352 ft). It is 58.9 km (36.6 mi) long, of which 58.4 km (36.3 mi) is in the Czech Republic (including the 850 m (2,790 ft) stretch that partly forms the Austrian–Czech border). Its drainage basin has an area of 402.4 km^{2} (155.4 sq mi), of which 386.9 km^{2} (149.4 sq mi) is in the Czech Republic.

The longest tributaries of the Stropnice are:

Tributary	Length (km)	Side
Svinenský potok	34.1	left
Žárský potok	19.4	left
Pašinovický potok	12.4	left
Vyšenský potok	11.3	right
Veveřský potok	9.0	right

== Course ==
There are no significant towns on the river. The river flows through the municipal territories of Moorbad Harbach, Horní Stropnice, Nové Hrady, Petříkov, Olešnice, Jílovice, Borovany, Trhové Sviny, Ostrolovský Újezd, Strážkovice, Komařice, Římov and Doudleby.

== Bodies of water ==
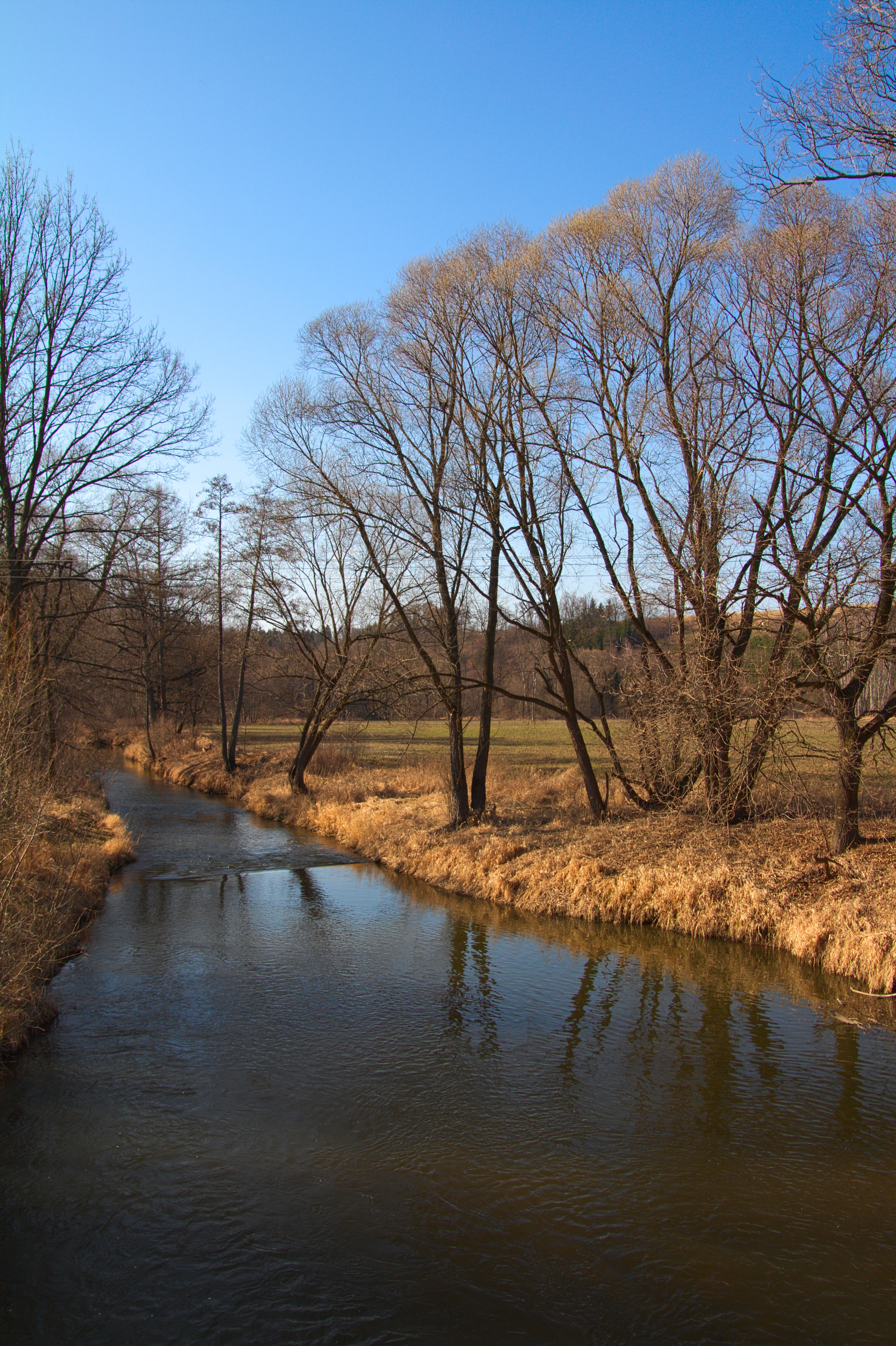
Lower course in Komařice-Pašinovice

The middle course of the river flows through the Třeboň Basin, which is known for abundance of fishponds. There are 929 bodies of water in the basin area. The largest of them is the fishpond Žárský with an area of 95.2 ha (235 acres), located on the Žárský potok. The Humenice Reservoir is built on the Stropnice. It was built in 1985–1988 on an area of 15.6 ha (39 acres). The main purpose is the protection of agricultural land.

== Tourism ==
The Stropnice is occasionally suitable for river tourism, but only in spring after heavy rains or melting snow.

== See also ==
- List of rivers of the Czech Republic
