= Římov =

Římov may refer to places in the Czech Republic:

- Římov (České Budějovice District), a municipality and village in the South Bohemian Region
  - Římov Reservoir
- Římov (Třebíč District), a municipality and village in the Vysočina Region
