= Velešín =

- Town
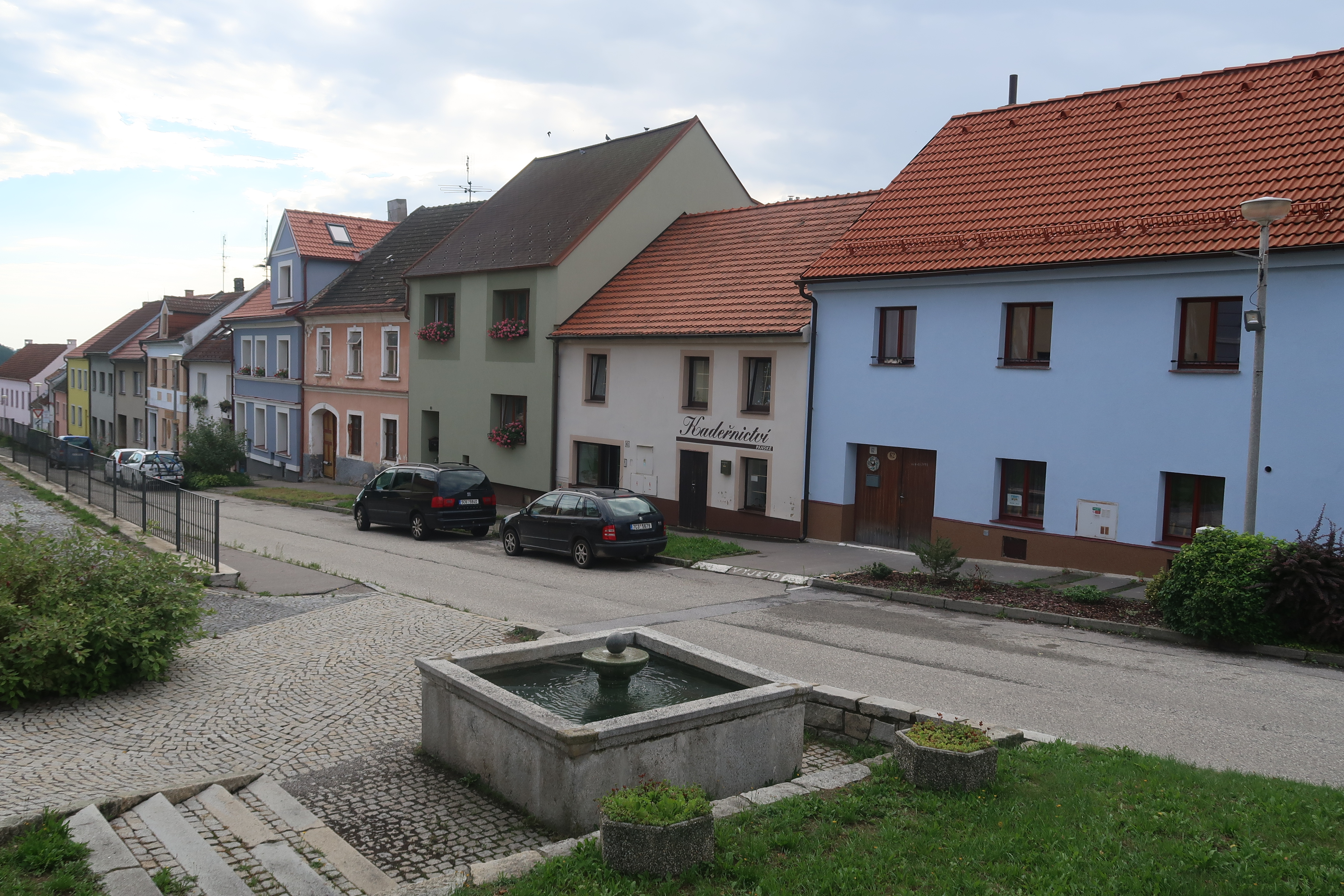
- Southern part of the town square

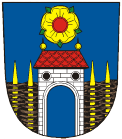
- Flag Coat of arms

- Location in the Czech Republic
- Coordinates: 48°49′46″N 14°27′45″E
- Country: Czech Republic
- Region: South Bohemian
- District: Český Krumlov
- First mentioned: 1266

Government
  - Mayor: Petr Vágner

Area
  - Total: 13.24 km^{2} (5.11 sq mi)
- Elevation: 548 m (1,798 ft)

Population (2026-01-01)
  - Total: 3,846
  - Density: 290.5/km^{2} (752.3/sq mi)
- Time zone: UTC+1 (CET)
  - Summer (DST): UTC+2 (CEST)
- Postal code: 382 32
- Website: www.velesin.cz

Velešín (Czech pronunciation: [ˈvɛlɛʃiːn]; German: Weleschin) is a town in Český Krumlov District the South Bohemian Region of the Czech Republic. It has about 3,800 inhabitants.

== Administrative division ==
Velešín consists of five municipal parts (in brackets population according to the 2021 census):

- Velešín (3,605)
- Bor (27)
- Chodeč (59)
- Holkov (52)
- Skřidla (35)

== Etymology ==
The name Velešín is derived from the personal name Veleša, meaning "Veleša's (castle, court)".

== Geography ==
Velešín is located about 10 kilometres (6 mi) east of Český Krumlov and 15 km (9 mi) south of České Budějovice. It lies in the Gratzen Foothills. The highest point is at 573 m (1,880 ft) above sea level. The town is situated on the shore of the Římov Reservoir, built on the Malše River.

== History ==
The first written mention of Velešín is from 1266, when the local castle was documented. The castle and the settlement were probably founded in the 13th century. From 1387 until 1611, Velešín was a property of the Rosenberg family. During this era, the village was promoted to a market town. The originally separate estate was merged with the Nové Hrady estate, and the importance of the castle declined. In the 1480s, the castle was abandoned and gradually fell into disrepair.

After death of Peter Vok of Rosenberg in 1611, Velešín was inherited by Jan Jiří of Schwamberg, but after the Bohemian Revolt, his properties were confiscated and Velešín was acquired by Count Charles Bonaventure of Bucquoy. The Bucquoys owned Velešín until 1848.

== Demographics ==
Historical population

Year	Pop.	±%
1869	1,551	—
1880	1,546	−0.3%
1890	1,620	+4.8%
1900	1,542	−4.8%
1910	1,452	−5.8%

Year	Pop.	±%
1921	1,495	+3.0%
1930	1,443	−3.5%
1950	1,357	−6.0%
1961	1,842	+35.7%
1970	2,103	+14.2%

Year	Pop.	±%
1980	2,956	+40.6%
1991	3,509	+18.7%
2001	4,027	+14.8%
2011	3,904	−3.1%
2021	3,778	−3.2%

Source: Censuses

== Transport ==
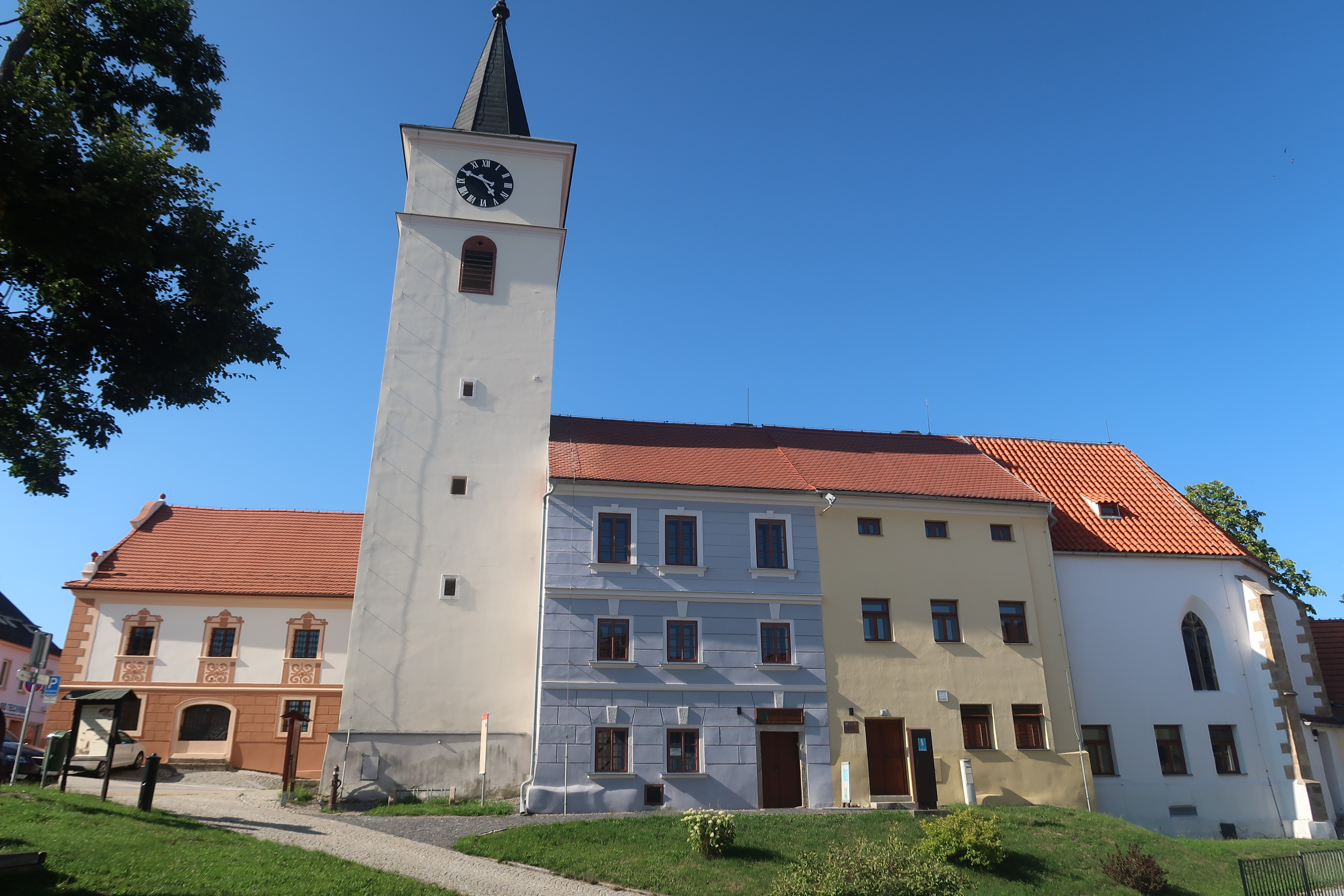
Town hall (left) and former Church of Saints Philip and James

The I/3 road (part of the European route E55), specifically the section from České Budějovice to the Czech–Austrian border in Dolní Dvořiště, runs through the town.

== Sights ==
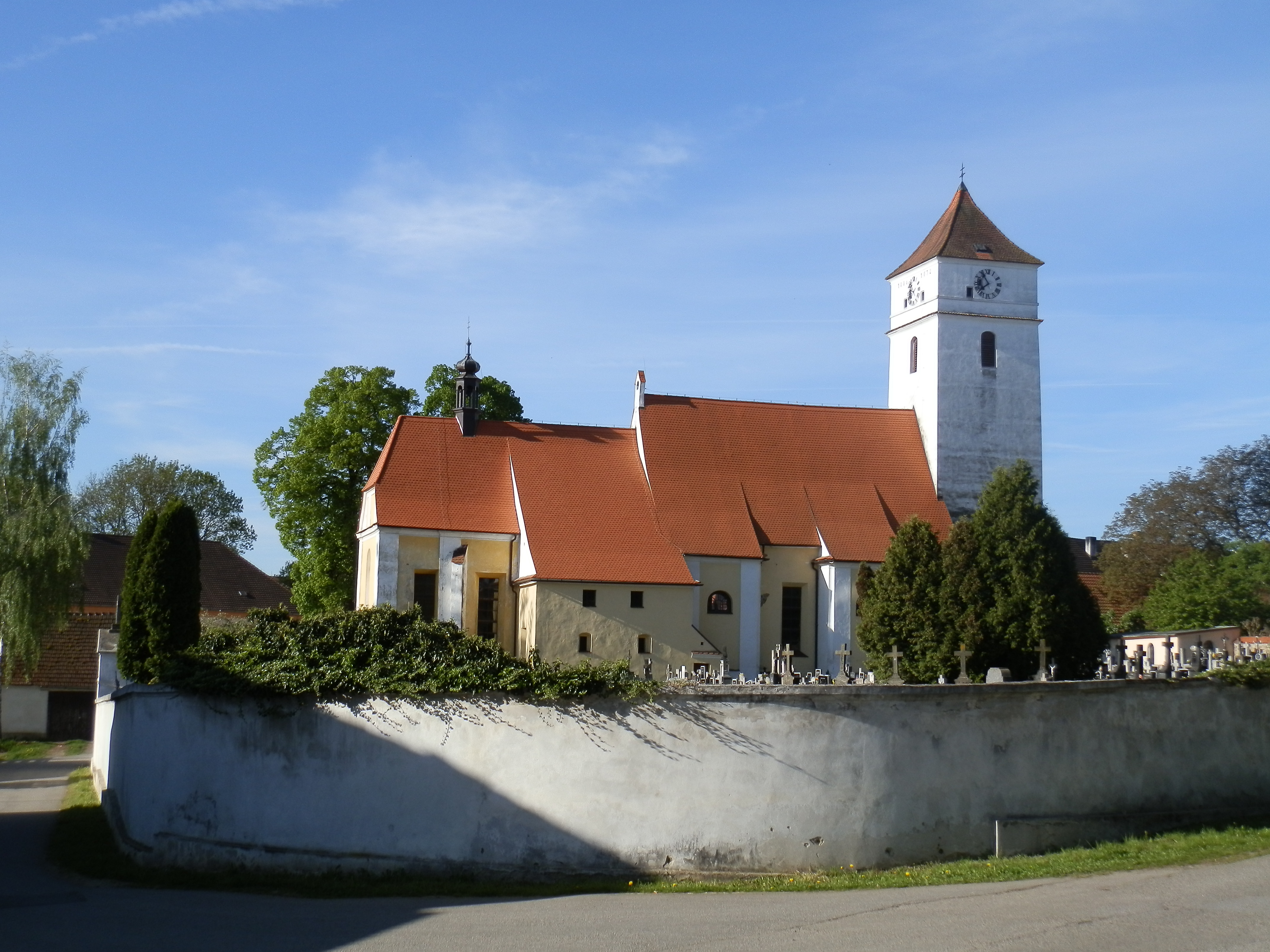
Church of Saint Wenceslaus

Among the main landmarks of the town is the Church of Saint Wenceslaus. It was built in the Gothic style in the mid-13th century. Significant Baroque modifications were made in 1751–1754.

The former Church of Saints Philip and James was built at the end of the 15th century and abolished in 1785. Today there is a museum and apartments in its premises. It is a unique example of the use of an abandoned church building.

North of the town there are remnants of the Budweis–Linz Horse-Drawn Railway, including one bridge. An educational trail leads around the remnants.

== Notable people ==
- Franciszek Krajowski (1861–1932), military officer
