= Malše =

Malše Maltsch
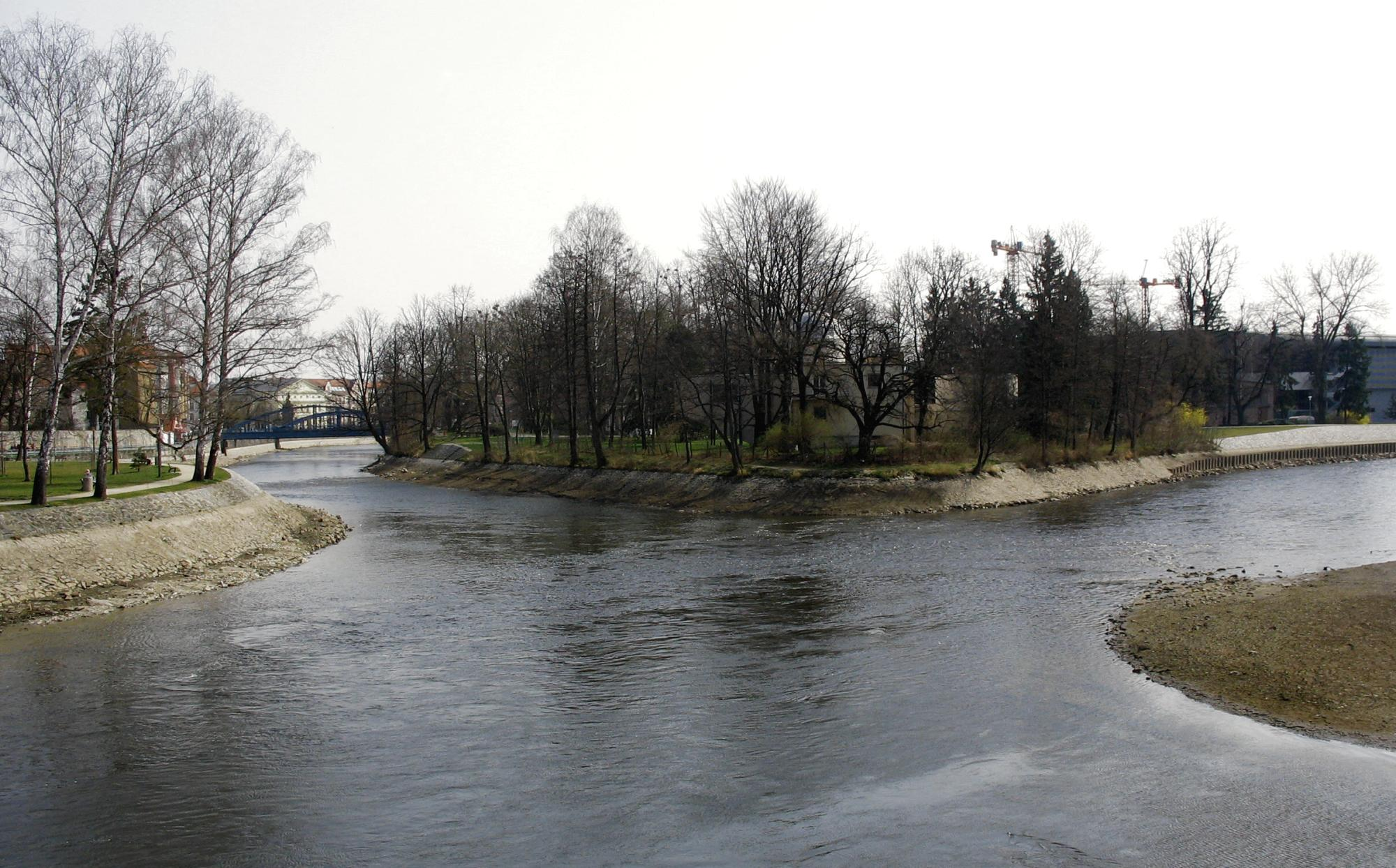
- Confluence of the Malše and Vltava rivers in České Budějovice

Location
- Countries: Czech Republic; Austria
- Regions/ States: South Bohemian; Upper Austria

Physical characteristics
- Source
  - location: Sandl, Gratzen Mountains
  - coordinates: 48°33′54″N 14°37′44″E
  - elevation: 985 m (3,232 ft)
- Mouth
  - location: Vltava
  - coordinates: 48°58′22″N 14°28′12″E
  - elevation: 384 m (1,260 ft)
- Length: 96.0 km (59.7 mi)
- Basin size: 979.1 km^{2} (378.0 sq mi)
- Discharge
  - average: 7.26 m^{3}/s (256 cu ft/s) near estuary

Basin features
- Progression: Vltava→ Elbe→ North Sea

The Malše (Czech pronunciation: [ˈmalʃɛ]; German: Maltsch) is a river in the Czech Republic and Austria, a right tributary of the Vltava River. It flows through Upper Austria and the South Bohemian Region. It is 96.0 km (59.7 mi) long.

== Etymology ==
The name is derived from the personal name Malch. The land through which the river flows once belonged to someone of that name.

== Characteristic ==
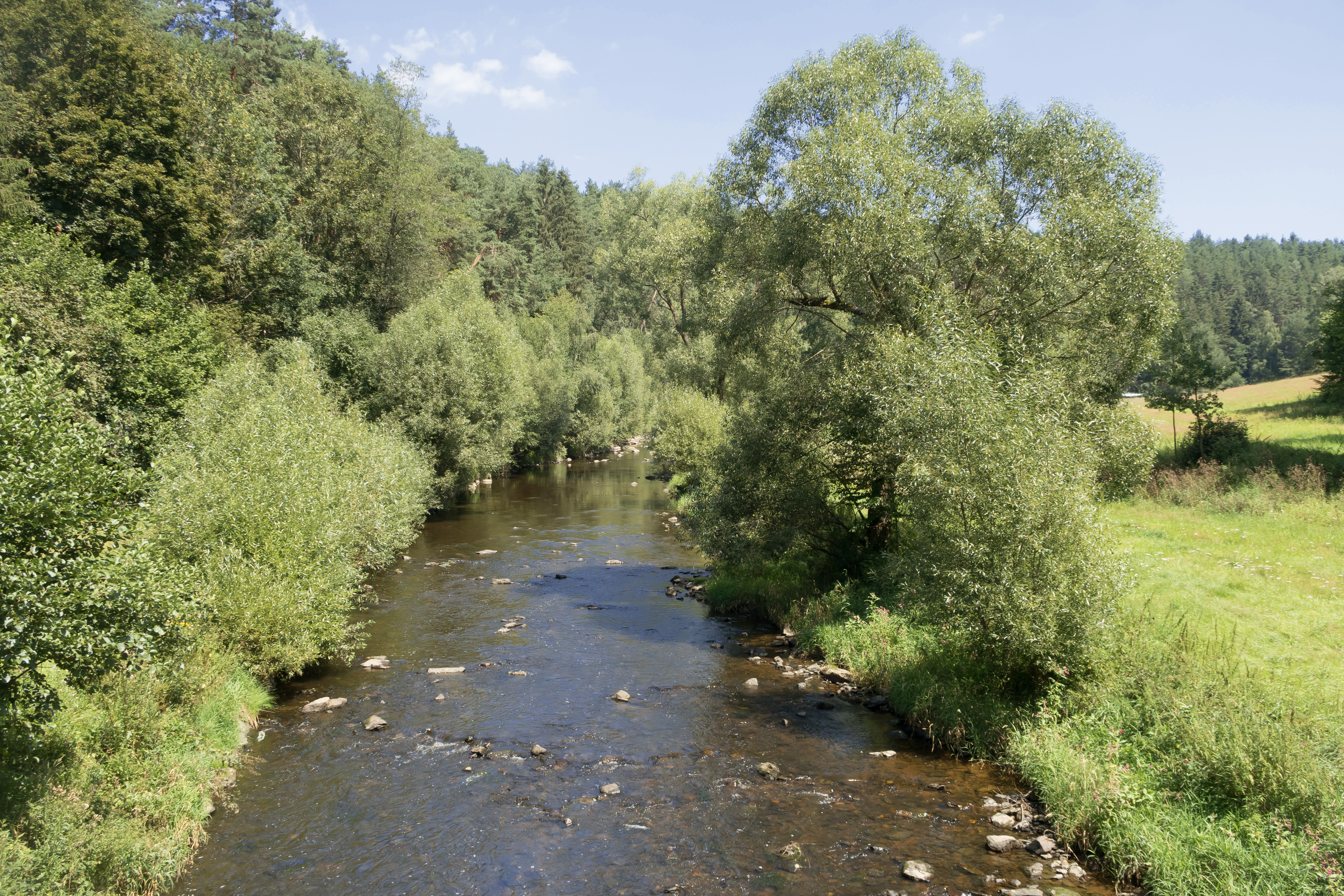
The Malše at Kaplice-Pořešín

The Malše originates in the territory of Sandl in the Gratzen Mountains at an elevation of 985 m (3,232 ft), on the slope of the Viehberg mountain, and flows to České Budějovice, where it enters the Vltava River at an elevation of 384 m (1,260 ft). The river is 96.0 km (59.7 mi) long, of which 89.3 km (55.5 mi) is in the Czech Republic (including the 22 km (14 mi) stretch that forms the Austrian–Czech border). Its drainage basin has an area of 979.1 km^{2} (378.0 sq mi), of which 869.2 km^{2} (335.6 sq mi) is in the Czech Republic.

The longest tributaries of the Malše are:

Tributary	Length (km)	River km	Side
Stropnice	58.9	16.6	right
Černá	29.9	44.7	right
Kamenice	13.5	52.9	right
Tichá	10.8	64.9	right
Zborovský potok	10.4	12.3	right

== Course ==
The most notable settlement on the river is the city of České Budějovice. In Austria, the river flows past the territories of Sandl, Windhaag bei Freistadt and Leopoldschlag, then turns north into the hinterland of the Czech Republic. The river then flows through the municipal territories of Dolní Dvořiště, Bujanov, Kaplice, Soběnov, Svatý Jan nad Malší, Velešín, Římov, Doudleby, Plav, Vidov, Roudné and České Budějovice.

== Bodies of water ==
The largest body of water on the Malše and in its whole basin area is the Římov Reservoir with an area of 201 ha (500 acres). It serves as a drinking water reservoir for České Budějovice and the surrounding area. There are 179 bodies of water larger than 1 ha (2.5 acres) in the basin area.

== See also ==
- List of rivers of the Czech Republic
