= František Binder =

Czech airman

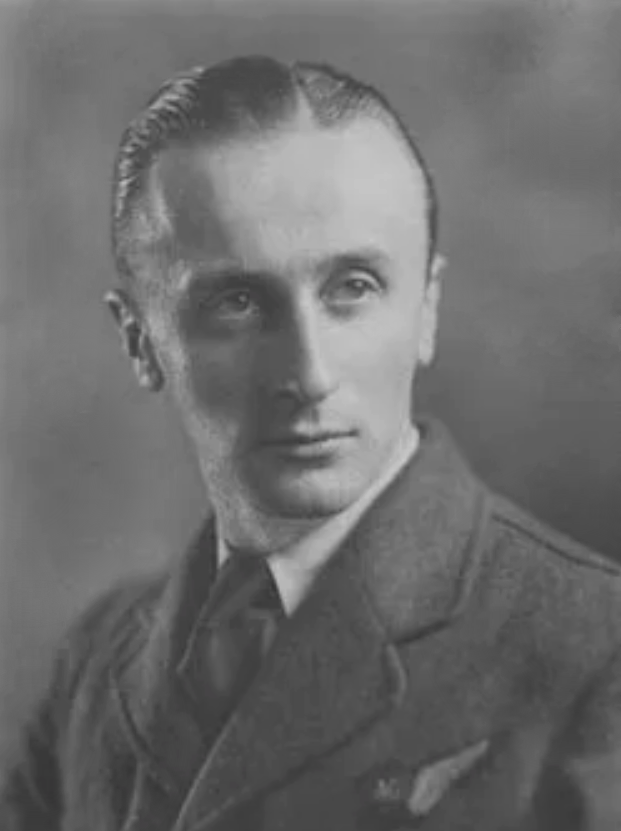
Image of Frantisek Binder

Lieutenant Colonel in memoriam František Binder (22 October 1914 in Hojná Voda, Austria-Hungary – 3 March 1942 in East Wretham, Norfolk) was a Czech soldier who participated in the fights to save the Czechoslovak state borders in the unit SOS - State Defense Guard (part of the Financial Guard) and subsequently for World War II fighting in the Royal Air Force (RAF) against Nazi Germany. After the conflict in the fight with a night fighter he died at RAF home base in England, East Wretham, Norfolk.

== Military service and service at State Defense Guard ==
- 1 October 1935 - presented to the full-service performance and embodied, as a Private CSA (Czechoslovak Army), at 9 platoon of 1st Infantry Regiment "Mistr Jan Hus",
- 16 September 1936 - promoted to the rank of Private first class,
- 24 May 1938 - after completing military service he was presented to four week workout in arms,
- 25 May 1938 - released into the relationship out of active service as a member of State Defense Guard,
- From 15 June 1938 - served, along with his stepfather Chief Officer Vaclav Jenik, on the Department of Financial Guard, the Customs office Kaplicke Chalupy Czechoslovakia/Guglwald Austria. Here, in September 1938 has seen several attacks of Freikorps,
- 29 November 1938 - ceased operation at the State Defense Guard in protecting the national borders and like a member of the resistance in the service of the "Nation's defenses" he performs intelligence activities until leaving the country.

== France ==
- 25 January 1940 - presented to the Czechoslovak consulate in Marseille after landing transport from Beirut (Beyrouth),
- 26 January 1940 - presented in the Agde and embodied at 1st platoon of 3rd. Infantry Regiment,
- 8 February 1940 - relocated to moto squad at the 3rd. Infantry Regiment, where he held military service row and worked as an instructor at a training platoon,
- From 2 to 12 April 1940 - annual holiday to stay in Paris,
- 30 May 1940 - relocated to the air group,
- 24 June 1940 - departure from France, Port Vendres, with a group of pilots and airman in the transport of Air Force Lt. Col. Karel Toman.

== England and Royal Air Force ==
- 7 July 1940 - arrival to England (Liverpool),
- 25 July 1940 - admitted to RAF with the rank of AC2 (Aircraftman Class No 2) as a Volunteer Reserve in Czechoslovak Depot at the base Cosford,
- 5 September 1940 - relocated to 312th. Czechoslovak Fighter Squadron as a gunner mechanic,
- 25 January 1941 – promoted to the rank of AC1 (Aircraftman No 1 Class),
- 3 May 1941 - at his own request, assigned to the unit No.4 Air Observers School in West Freugh Scotland, where he began aerial shooting course (Air Gunner),
- 19 June 1941 – promoted to the rank of T/Sgt (Technical Sergeant) and Air Gunner qualification awarded,
- 21 June 1941 - transfer to 311th. Czechoslovak Bomber Squadron in East Wretham,
- 4 March 1942 - killed in action
- 7 March 1942 - Funeral of Sgt Binder, who died as a result of injuries in operating activities, takes place on Saturday, 7 March 1942.

== Decorations ==
- 1942 Czechoslovak Medal for Bravery
- 1946 Czechoslovak War Cross 1939-1945
- 1947 Czechoslovak Medal for Bravery
- 2014 1939-45 Star and Bomber Command Clasp
- 2014 Aircrew Europe Star
- 2014 Defence medal
- 2014 War Medal 1939-45

== Recognition ==
- 1947 He was posthumously promoted to the rank of Staff Sergeant in the Czechoslovak Air Force reservists
- 1991 He was promoted to the rank of lieutenant colonel in the Czechoslovak Air Force reservists
- 1991 At the Rehabilitation Ceremony, held in Prague on 13 September 1991, the Czechoslovak airmen who had served in the RAF in World War II were morally and politically rehabilitated by post-Communist Czechoslovakia. These airmen were finally recognised and acknowledged by their country for fighting for the liberation of their homeland from Nazi Germany. At this ceremony František Binder was honourably mentioned.

== Bibliography ==
- Holub, Ota (1987). Stůj! Finanční stráž!. Praha: Naše vojsko.
- Loucký, František (1989). Mnozí nedoletěli. Praha: Naše vojsko. ISBN 80-206-0053-1.
- Radosta, Petr (1990). Noci nad Německem. Praha: Nakladatelství dopravy a spojů. ISBN 80-7030-122-8.
- Pajer, Miloslav (1994). Křídla míří nad Německo. Cheb: Svět křídel. ISBN 80-85280-22-1.
- Marek, Jindřich (2000). Smrt v celním pásu (Historické reportáže o ostraze čs. hranic v letech 1918-1948). Cheb: Svět křídel. ISBN 80-85280-67-1.
- Rajlich, Jiří (2001). Na nebi hrdého Albionu 3. část (1942). Cheb: Svět křídel. ISBN 80-85280-77-9.
- Rajlich, Jiří (2004). Na nebi hrdého Albionu 7. část. Cheb: Svět křídel. ISBN 80-86808-12-2.
- Vančata, Pavel (2004). Klikař Roger (Životní příběh Jaromíra Bajera, radiotelegrafisty a střelce RAF). Praha: Ostrov. ISBN 80-86289-36-2.
- Hurt, Zdeněk (2005). Czechs in RAF Squadrons of World War II in Focus / Češi a Slováci v RAF za Druhé světové války. UK Red Kite Books / CZ Computer press. ISBN 978-8025108031.
- Beneš, Jaroslav (2005). Finanční stráž československá 1918-1938. Dvůr Králové nad Labem: Ing. Jan Škoda - FORTprint. ISBN 80-86011-29-1.
- Vondrka, Vladimír; Burian, Vladislav; Hazuka, Aleš (2012). ZA HROBY SE LVY (Po stopách osudů čs. válečných letců padlých v letech 1939 - 1945). Jindřichův Hradec: Klub historie letectví Jindřichův Hradec. ISBN 978-80-260-2442-2.
- Hamberger, Pavel (2013). Frantisek Binder. Free Czechoslovak Air Force Associates ltd.
- Vančata, Pavel (2013). Z deníku radiotelegrafisty (Unikátní válečný deník Sgt Pavla Tofla, příslušníka 311. čs. bombardovací perutě RAF). Cheb: Svět křídel. ISBN 978-80-87567-30-2.
- Vančata, Pavel (2013). 311 Squadron. United Kingdom: Mushroom Model Publications (MMP Books). ISBN 978-83-61421-43-6.
