= Trhové Sviny =

- Town
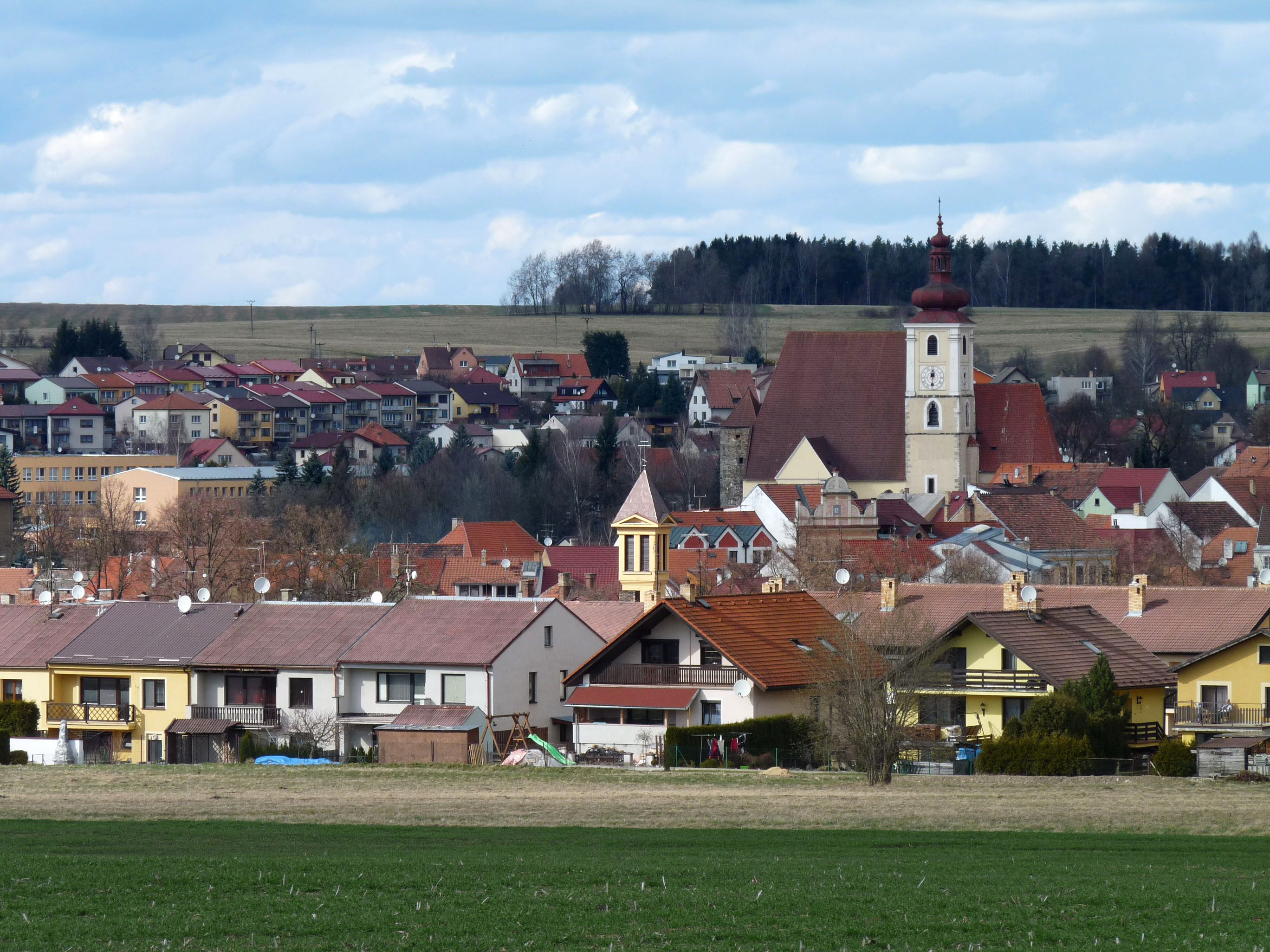
- View from the south

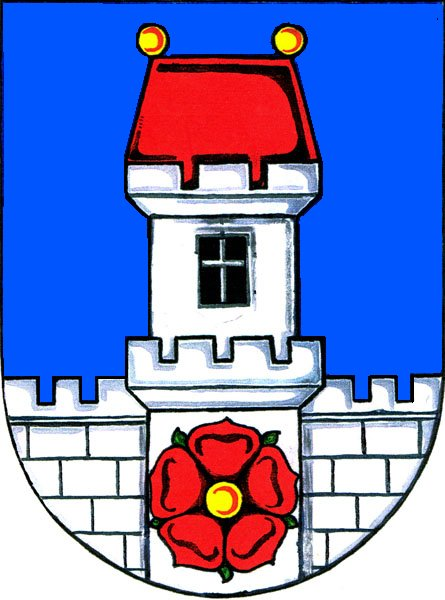
- Flag Coat of arms

- Location in the Czech Republic
- Coordinates: 48°50′33″N 14°38′21″E
- Country: Czech Republic
- Region: South Bohemian
- District: České Budějovice
- First mentioned: 1260

Government
  - Mayor: David Štojdl

Area
  - Total: 52.78 km^{2} (20.38 sq mi)
- Elevation: 458 m (1,503 ft)

Population (2026-01-01)
  - Total: 5,292
  - Density: 100.3/km^{2} (259.7/sq mi)
- Time zone: UTC+1 (CET)
  - Summer (DST): UTC+2 (CEST)
- Postal code: 374 01
- Website: www.tsviny.cz

Trhové Sviny (Czech pronunciation: [ˈtr̩ɦovɛː ˈsvɪnɪ]; German: Schweinitz) is a town in České Budějovice District in the South Bohemian Region of the Czech Republic. It has about 5,300 inhabitants. The town is located on the stream Svinenský potok.

Trhové Sviny was founded around 1250. The historic town centre is well preserved and is protected as an urban monument zone. The main landmarks of the town are the Church of the Assumption of the Virgin Mary and the Church of the Holy Trinity.

== Administrative division ==
Trhové Sviny consists of 14 municipal parts (in brackets population according to the 2021 census):

- Trhové Sviny (4,191)
- Březí (36)
- Bukvice (66)
- Čeřejov (59)
- Hrádek (43)
- Jedovary (55)
- Něchov (94)
- Nežetice (30)
- Otěvěk (275)
- Pěčín (33)
- Rankov (103)
- Todně (113)
- Třebíčko (34)
- Veselka (5)

== Etymology ==
The initial name of Trhové Sviny was Svinice. The name was derived either from the personal name Svině, or the inhabitants were known for pig farming ('swine' = svině in Czech). After the settlement gained the privilege of organising markets (trhy in Czech) in the 15th century, the prefix trhové was added to the name to distinguish it from Sviny in the same region.

== Geography ==
Trhové Sviny is located about 17 kilometres (11 mi) southeast of České Budějovice. It lies mostly in the Gratzen Foothills, but the eastern part lies in the Třeboň Basin. the Stropnice River flows through northwestern part of the municipal territory (through Jedovary and Veselka). The stream Svinenský potok, which is the longest tributary of the Stropnice, flows through the town proper. The municipal territory is rich in fishponds, typical for this region.

== History ==
The first written mention of Sviny is from 1260. It was founded around 1250 as a settlement with a castle on an old trade route, originally possibly called Svinice. In 1481, Sviny gained the privilege of organising markets from King Vladislaus II.

== Demographics ==
Historical population

Year	Pop.	±%
1869	5,436	—
1880	5,742	+5.6%
1890	5,430	−5.4%
1900	5,525	+1.7%
1910	5,625	+1.8%

Year	Pop.	±%
1921	5,223	−7.1%
1930	4,823	−7.7%
1950	3,809	−21.0%
1961	4,136	+8.6%
1970	4,006	−3.1%

Year	Pop.	±%
1980	4,461	+11.4%
1991	4,632	+3.8%
2001	4,620	−0.3%
2011	4,983	+7.9%
2021	5,137	+3.1%

Source: Censuses

== Transport ==
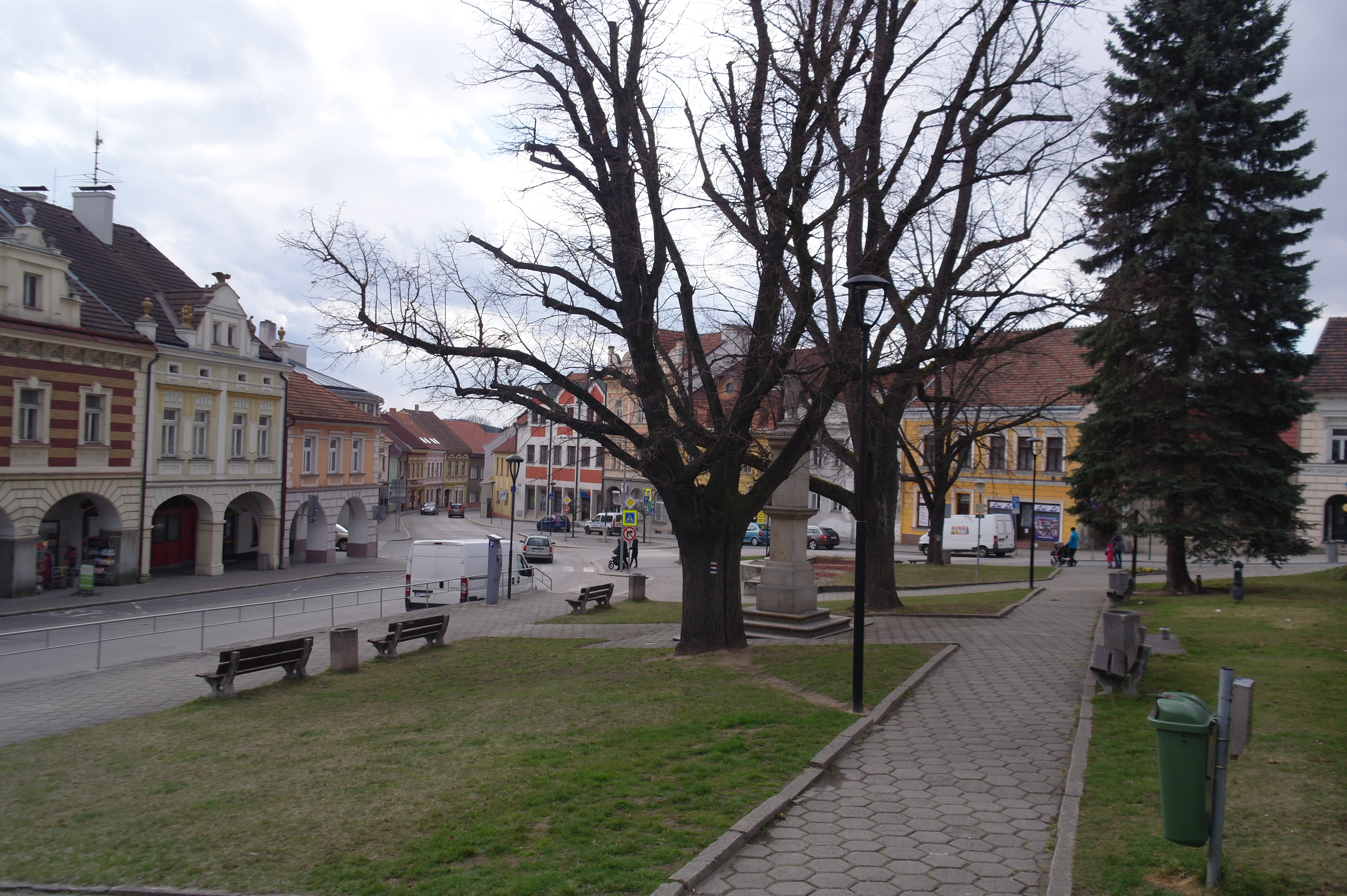
The square Žižkovo náměstí

There are no railways or major roads passing through the municipality.

== Sights ==
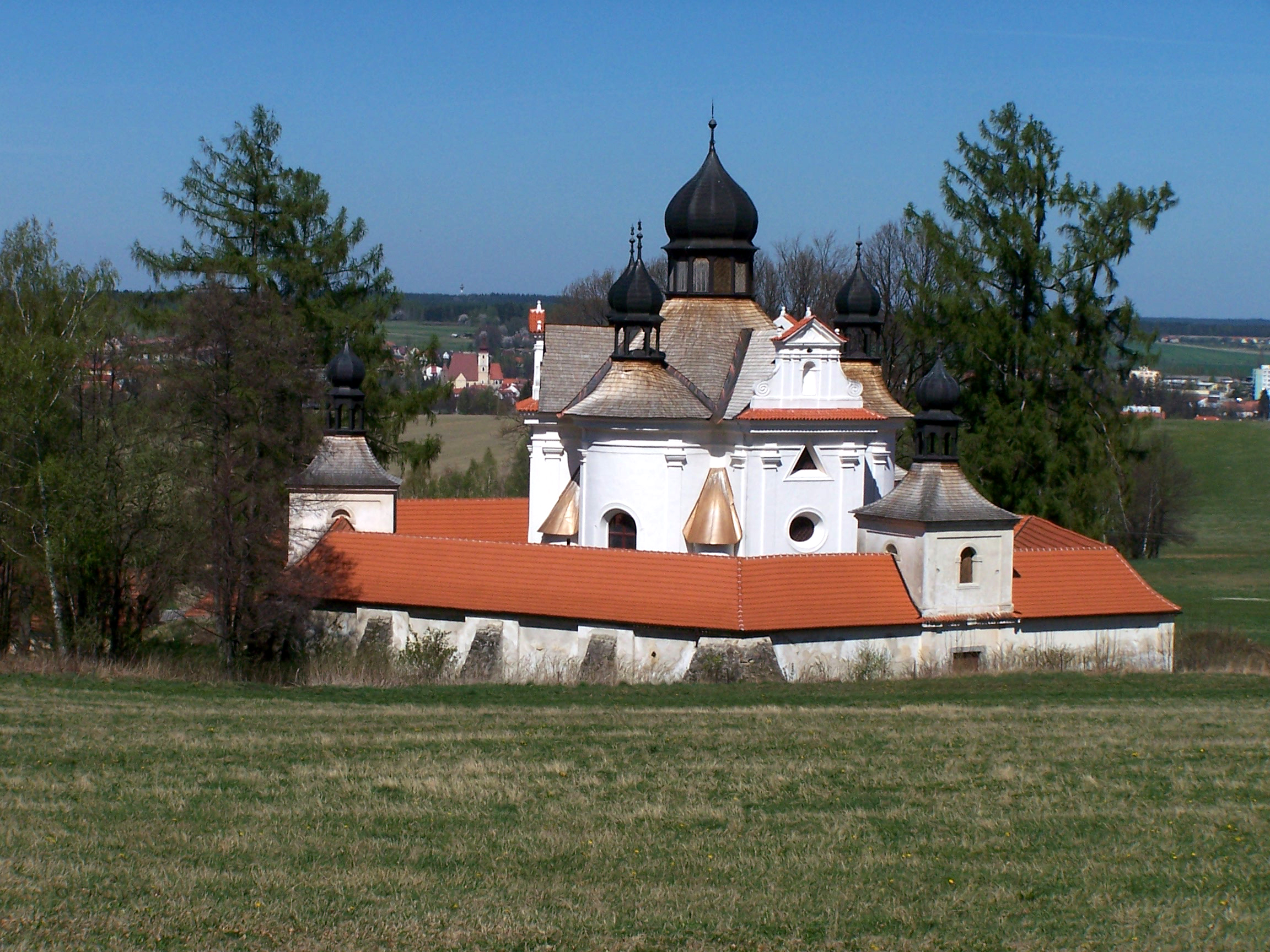
Pilgrimage Church of the Holy Trinity

The Church of the Holy Trinity is the most impressive landmark of Trhové Sviny, located outside the built-up area. It was built in the Baroque style in 1708–1710 and replaced a pilgrimage chapel, which stood here already in the 16th century. Next to the church is a small spa building with healing spring.

The Church of the Assumption of the Virgin Mary is located in the centre of Trhové Sviny. It is a late Gothic church originally from the end of the 13th century, rebuilt in the late 15th century.

The town hall on the square Žižkovo náměstí from 1845 replaced an old building from the 16th century. It stands in the middle of a row of valuable houses with compactly preserved arcades along the entire south side of the square. Gothic cellar and edging of a painted emblem in the building's gable are preserved from the older building. Other sights on the square are Baroque column with the statue of John of Nepomuk from 1722, and a hexagonal stone fountain from 1864.

== Notable people ==
- Emil Hácha (1872–1945), President of Czechoslovakia in 1938–1939
