= Svatý Jan nad Malší =

- Municipality
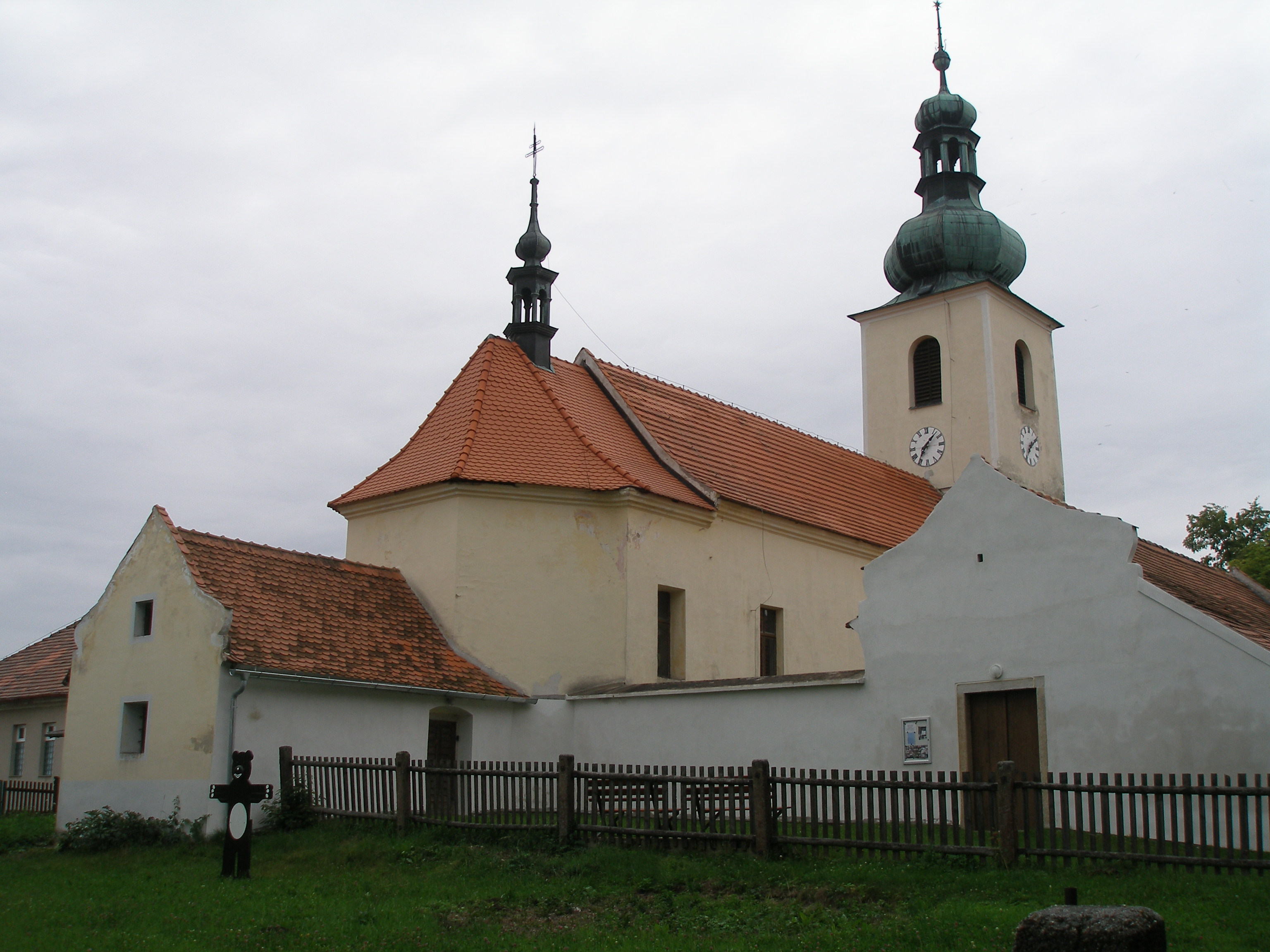
- Church of Saint John of Nepomuk

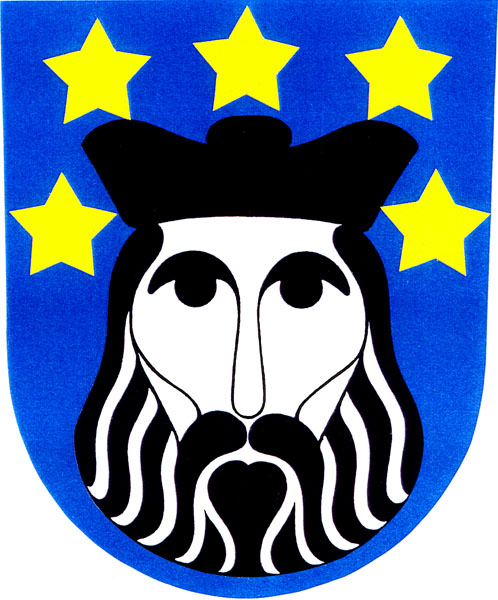
- Flag Coat of arms

- Location in the Czech Republic
- Coordinates: 48°49′27″N 14°30′31″E
- Country: Czech Republic
- Region: South Bohemian
- District: České Budějovice
- First mentioned: 1789

Area
  - Total: 12.96 km^{2} (5.00 sq mi)
- Elevation: 614 m (2,014 ft)

Population (2026-01-01)
  - Total: 649
  - Density: 50.1/km^{2} (130/sq mi)
- Time zone: UTC+1 (CET)
  - Summer (DST): UTC+2 (CEST)
- Postal code: 373 23
- Website: www.svjan.cz

Svatý Jan nad Malší (German: Johannesberg) is a municipality and village in České Budějovice District in the South Bohemian Region of the Czech Republic. It has about 600 inhabitants.

Svatý Jan nad Malší lies on the Malše river, approximately 17 kilometres (11 mi) south of České Budějovice and 141 km (88 mi) south of Prague.

== Administrative division ==
Svatý Jan nad Malší consists of three municipal parts (in brackets population according to the 2021 census):

- Svatý Jan nad Malší (424)
- Chlum (30)
- Sedlce (123)

== Demographics ==
Historical population
Year	Pop.	±%
1869	1,001	—
1880	1,051	+5.0%
1890	1,015	−3.4%
1900	1,010	−0.5%
1910	988	−2.2%
1921	1,039	+5.2%
1930	870	−16.3%
1950	573	−34.1%
1961	635	+10.8%
1970	562	−11.5%
1980	464	−17.4%
1991	358	−22.8%
2001	375	+4.7%
2011	532	+41.9%
2021	577	+8.5%
Source: Censuses

== Twin towns – sister cities ==
Svatý Jan nad Malší is twinned with:

- Grünbach, Austria
