= Doudleby =

- Municipality
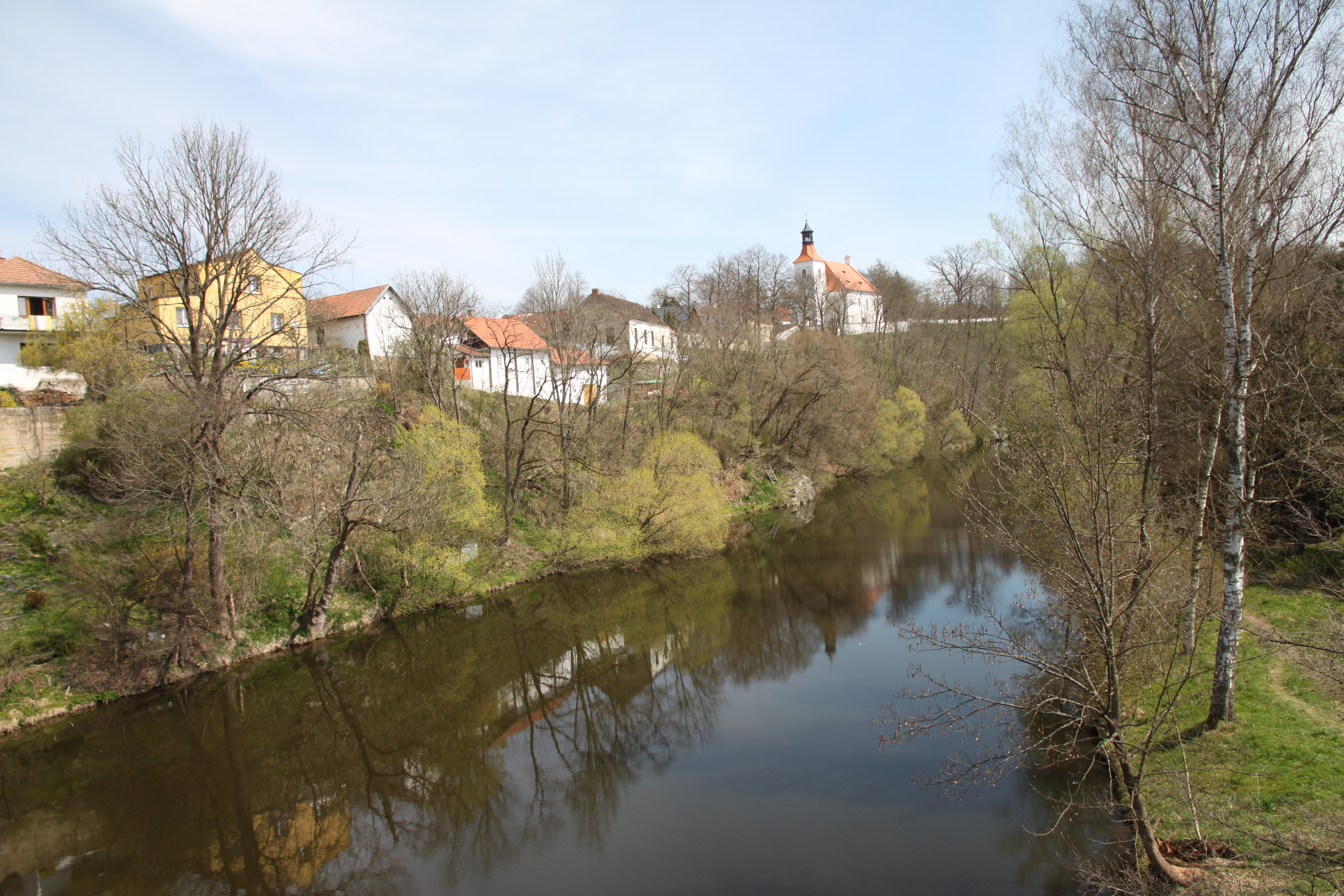
- Doudleby above the Malše River

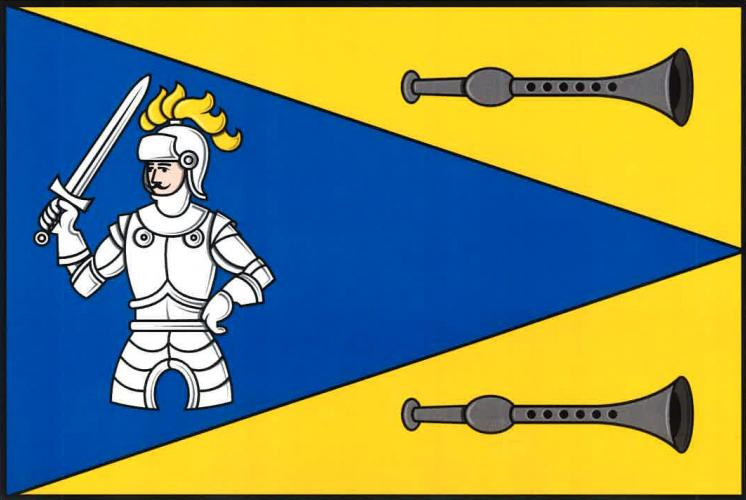
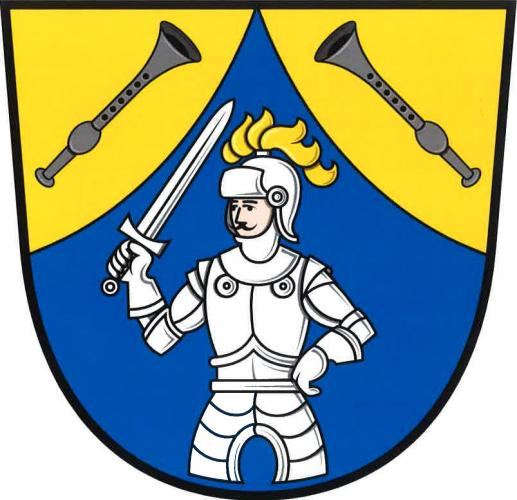
- Flag Coat of arms

- Location in the Czech Republic
- Coordinates: 48°53′37″N 14°30′5″E
- Country: Czech Republic
- Region: South Bohemian
- District: České Budějovice
- First mentioned: 981

Area
  - Total: 5.86 km^{2} (2.26 sq mi)
- Elevation: 425 m (1,394 ft)

Population (2026-01-01)
  - Total: 456
  - Density: 77.8/km^{2} (202/sq mi)
- Time zone: UTC+1 (CET)
  - Summer (DST): UTC+2 (CEST)
- Postal code: 370 07
- Website: www.doudleby.com

Doudleby (German: Teindles) is a municipality and village in České Budějovice District in the South Bohemian Region of the Czech Republic. It has about 500 inhabitants.

== Administrative division ==
Doudleby consists of two municipal parts (in brackets population according to the 2021 census):

- Doudleby (186)
- Straňany (296)

== Etymology ==
The name is derived from the Slavic tribe of Dulebes, who lived there in the mid-10th century.

== Geography ==
Doudleby is located about 8 kilometres (5 mi) south of České Budějovice. It lies in the Gratzen Foothills. The village of Doudleby lies in a meander of the Malše River and the village of Straňany lies on the opposite bank. The Stropnice River joins the Malše south of Straňany.

== History ==
The first written mention of Doudleby is in the Chronica Boemorum chronicle, where there is a mention of a gord related to the year 981. According to the chronicle, this fortified settlement was part of the early medieval Slavník's territory, but according to today's historians, it was a Přemyslid gord. Doudleby was then located on at the crossroads of two important trade routes and served as the centre of the region. After the founding of the city of České Budějovice in 1265, the importance of Doudleby quickly declined.

== Demographics ==
Historical population

Year	Pop.	±%
1869	491	—
1880	523	+6.5%
1890	512	−2.1%
1900	492	−3.9%
1910	503	+2.2%

Year	Pop.	±%
1921	454	−9.7%
1930	437	−3.7%
1950	371	−15.1%
1961	381	+2.7%
1970	357	−6.3%

Year	Pop.	±%
1980	367	+2.8%
1991	355	−3.3%
2001	354	−0.3%
2011	436	+23.2%
2021	482	+10.6%

Source: Censuses

== Transport ==
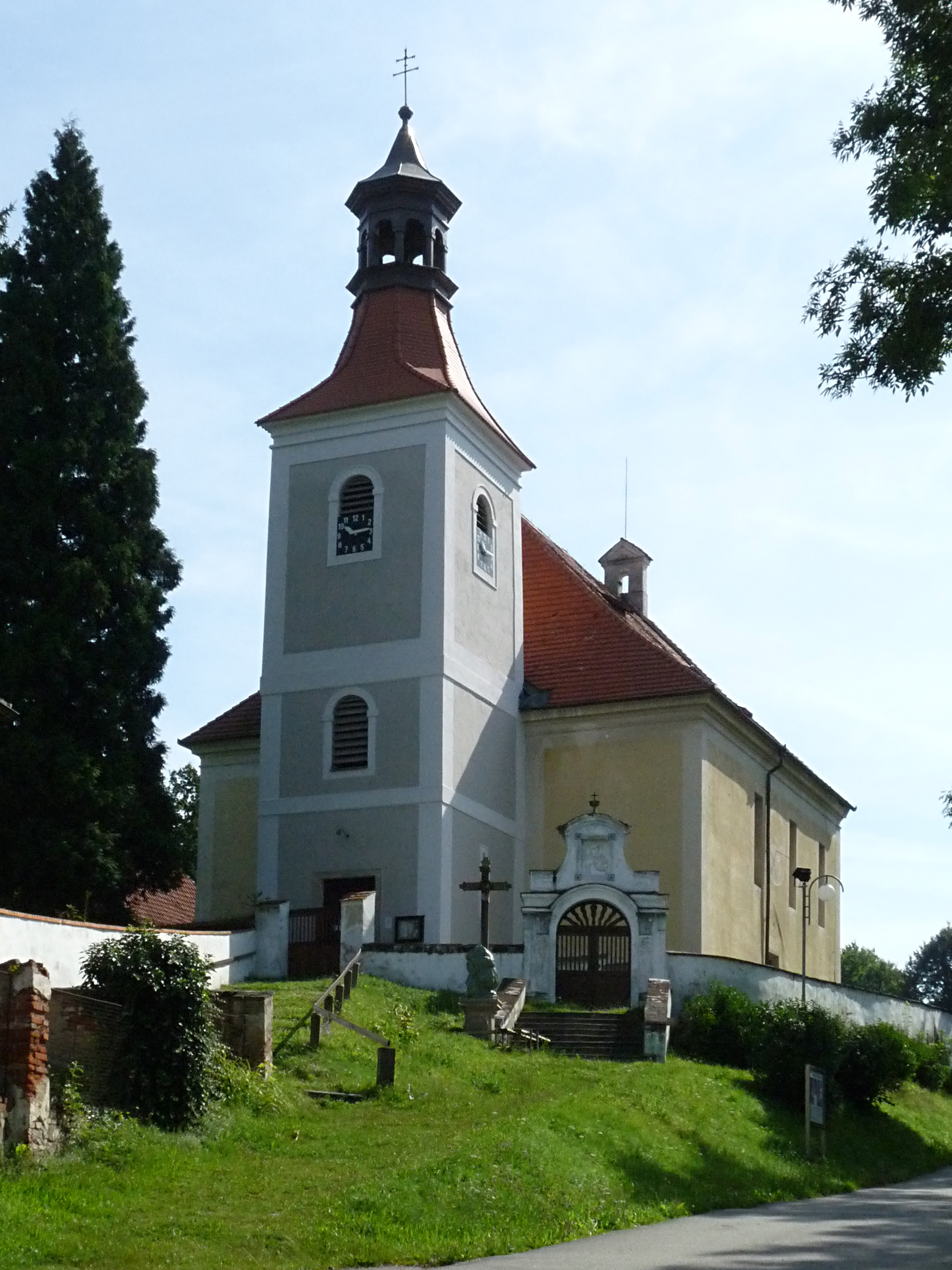
Church of Saint Vincent

There are no railways or major roads passing through the municipality.

== Sights ==
The Church of Saint Vincent was first mentioned in 1143. The oldest preserved parts are the Gothic sacristy and chancel from the 14th century. The nave was added at the end of the 15th century. In 1708–1709, the church was rebuilt in the Baroque style, and the tower was added.
