= Římov (České Budějovice District) =

- Municipality
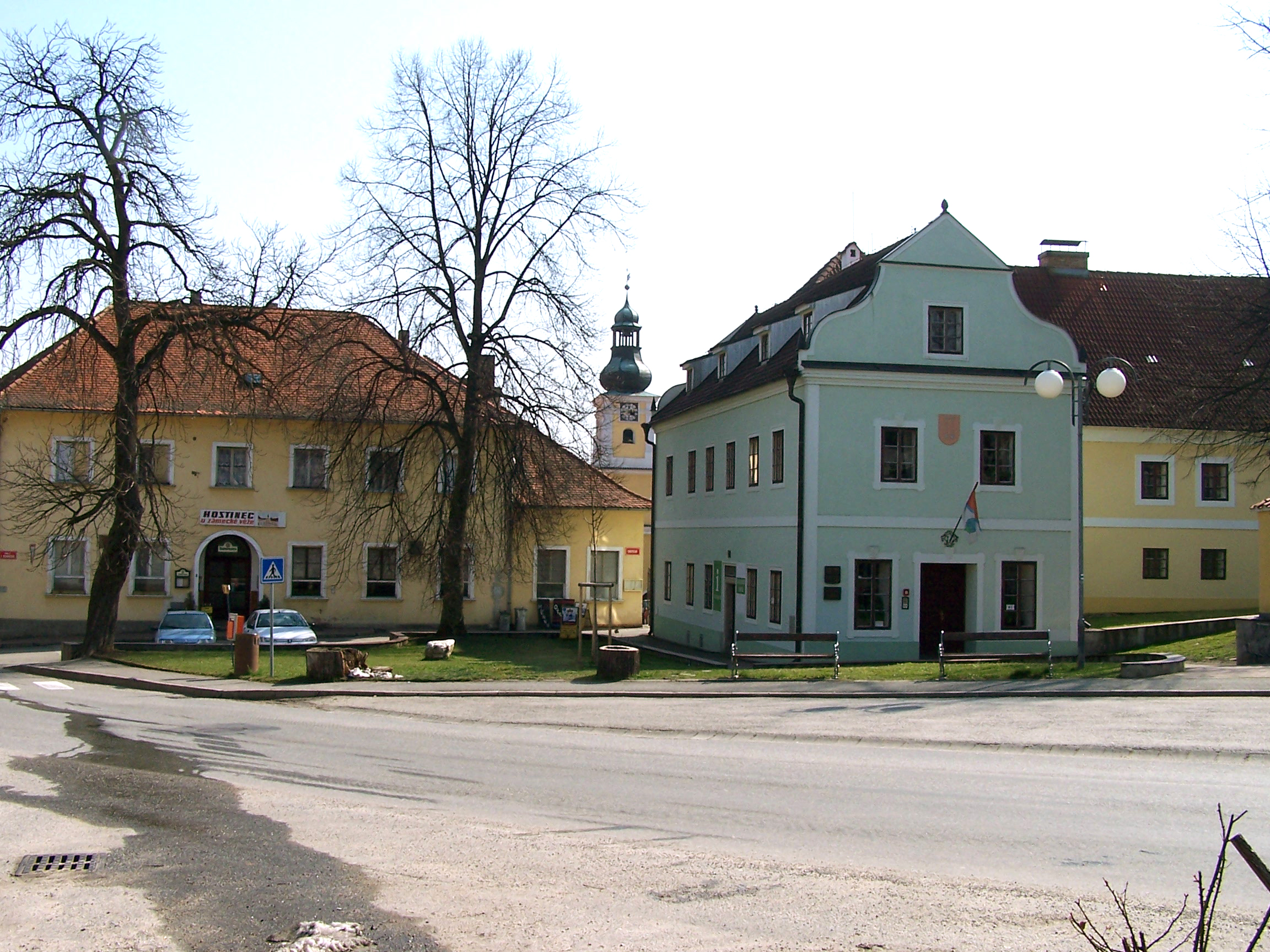
- Centre of Římov

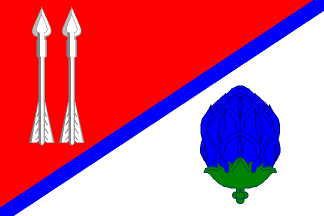
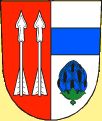
- Flag Coat of arms

- Location in the Czech Republic
- Coordinates: 48°51′20″N 14°29′13″E
- Country: Czech Republic
- Region: South Bohemian
- District: České Budějovice
- First mentioned: 1395

Area
  - Total: 15.28 km^{2} (5.90 sq mi)
- Elevation: 471 m (1,545 ft)

Population (2026-01-01)
  - Total: 1,045
  - Density: 68.39/km^{2} (177.1/sq mi)
- Time zone: UTC+1 (CET)
  - Summer (DST): UTC+2 (CEST)
- Postal code: 373 24
- Website: www.rimov.cz

Římov (German: Rimau) is a municipality and village in České Budějovice District in the South Bohemian Region of the Czech Republic. It has about 1,000 inhabitants.

== Administrative division ==
Římov consists of six municipal parts (in brackets population according to the 2021 census):

- Římov (676)
- Branišovice (85)
- Dolní Stropnice (121)
- Dolní Vesce (8)
- Horní Vesce (7)
- Kladiny (47)

== Etymology ==
The initial name of Římov was Hřimov. The name was derived from the personal name Hřim, meaning "Hřim's (court)". From the early 15th century, the name Římov was used.

== Geography ==
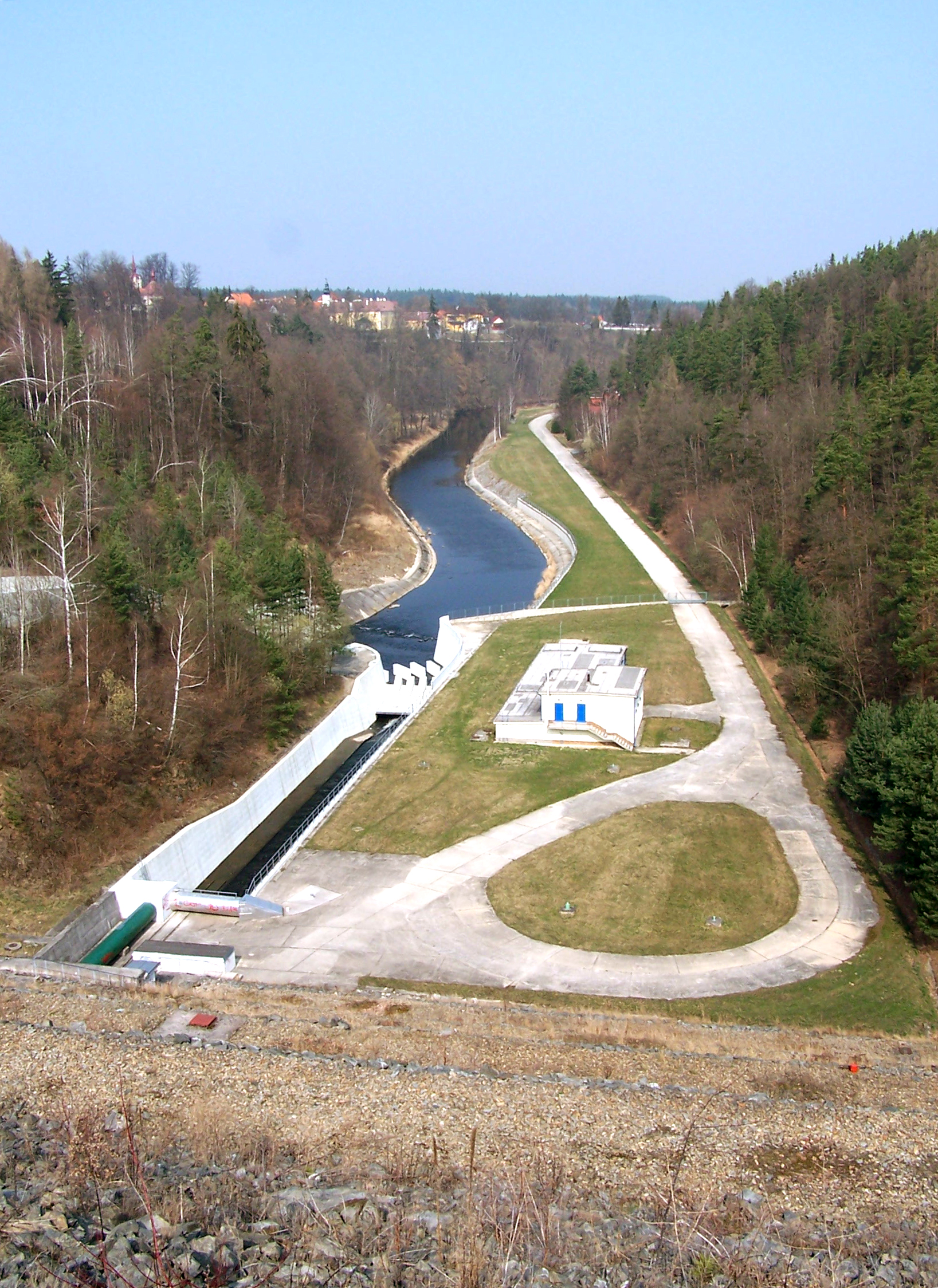
View from the dam downstream towards Římov

Římov is located about 12 kilometres (7 mi) south of České Budějovice. It lies in the Gratzen Foothills. The highest point is at 554 m (1,818 ft) above sea level. The municipality is situated on the left bank of the Malše River. The Stropnice River flows along the northern municipal border.

On the Malše River just above the village is the Římov Reservoir, which provides drinking water for large portion of the South Bohemian Region. The dam, completed in 1978, is 47.5 metres (156 ft) high and 290 metres (950 ft) long at crest. The reservoir has a volume of 33.8 million m³.

== History ==
The first written mention of Římov is from 1395. The village was founded probably in the 13th century and belonged to lesser aristocratic families. In 1626, Římov became a property of the Duke of Eggenberg, the owner of the castle in Český Krumlov. In the same year the duke gave Římov to the Jesuits and they established there a pilgrimage site with large Stations of the Cross in 1648.

== Demographics ==
Historical population

Year	Pop.	±%
1869	1,240	—
1880	1,361	+9.8%
1890	1,342	−1.4%
1900	1,329	−1.0%
1910	1,362	+2.5%

Year	Pop.	±%
1921	1,283	−5.8%
1930	1,144	−10.8%
1950	902	−21.2%
1961	932	+3.3%
1970	873	−6.3%

Year	Pop.	±%
1980	783	−10.3%
1991	648	−17.2%
2001	666	+2.8%
2011	813	+22.1%
2021	944	+16.1%

Source: Censuses

== Transport ==
The I/3 road (part of the European route E55), specifically the section from České Budějovice to the Czech–Austrian border in Dolní Dvořiště, briefly crosses the municipal territory in the west.

== Sights ==
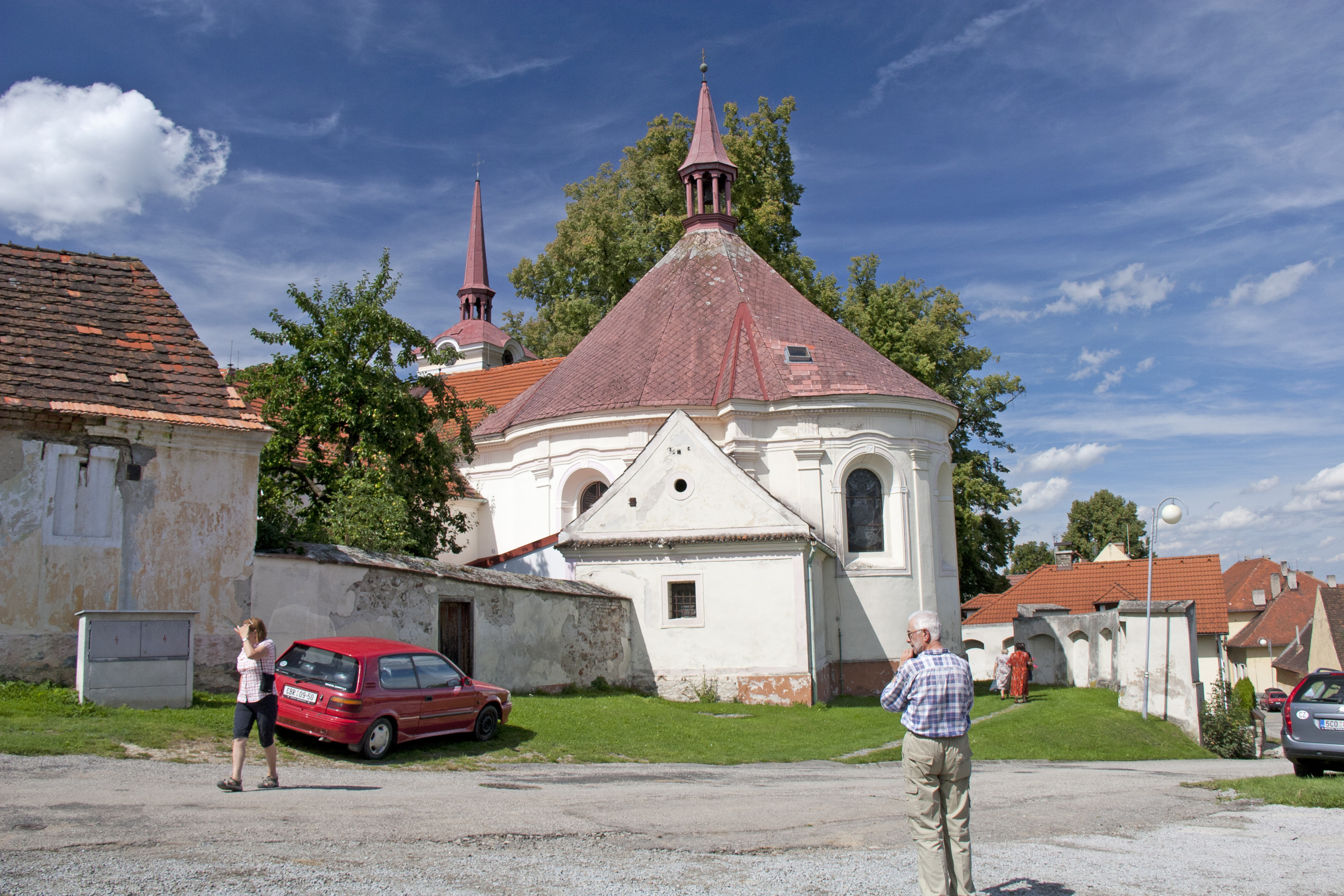
Loreto chapel

The most important monument is the pilgrimage complex with the Church of the Holy Spirit and Loreto Chapel of Santa Casa. The centre of the area is the Loreto chapel, surrounded by ambits with Baroque and Rococo wall paintings and a set of lunette paintings that depict important pilgrimage sites in the Czech Republic. The Church of the Holy Spirit was built in the early Baroque style in 1697. A tall prismatic belfry was added to it in 1891. The pilgrimage complex is protected as a national cultural monument.

The decoration of the set of 25 Passion chapels, which forms the Stations of the Cross, is also protected as a national cultural monument. Their value is due to their age and unusual scale, and their connection with the tradition of the pilgrimage site. The authorship of most of them is unknown.
