= Komařice =

- Municipality
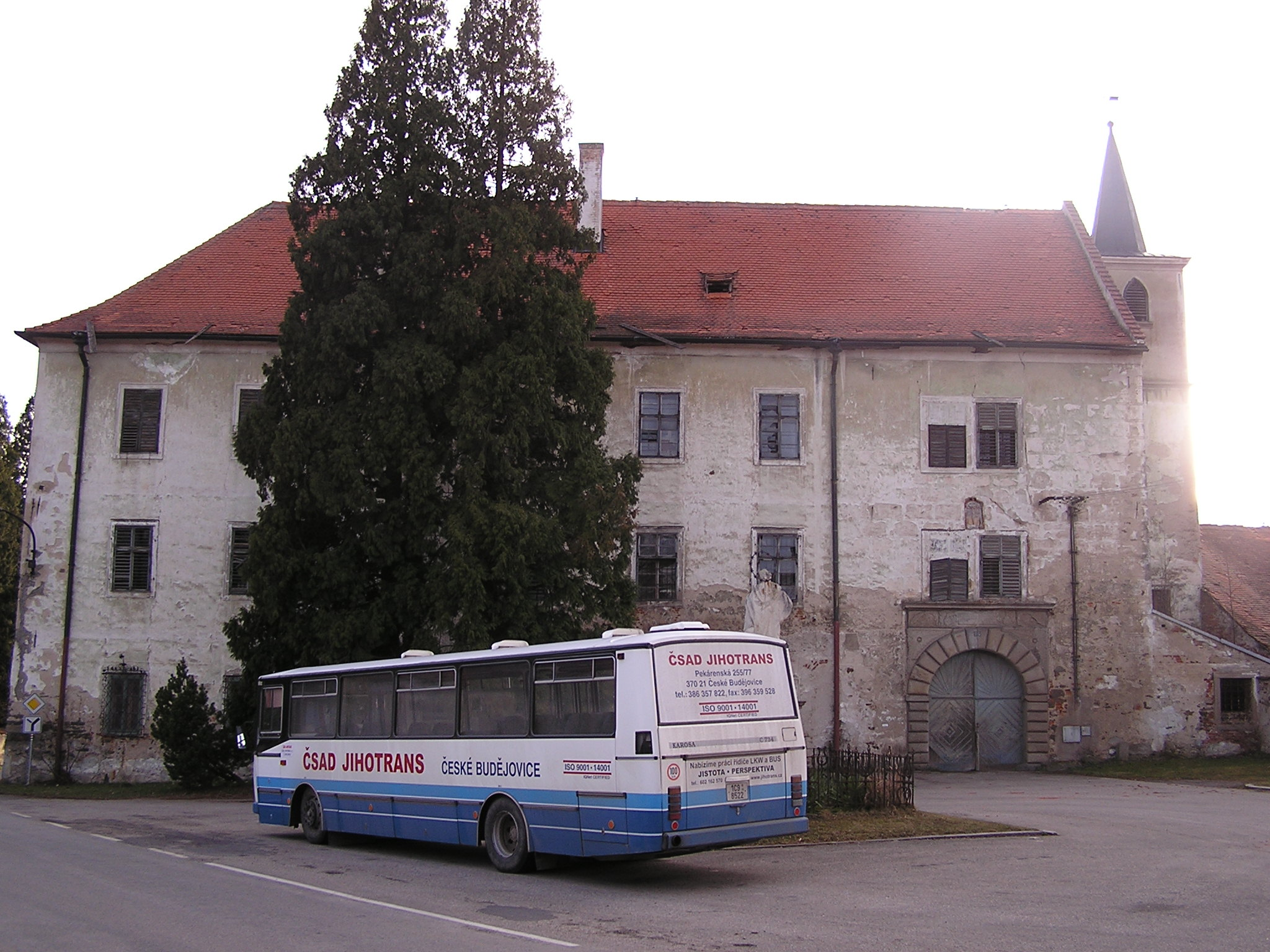
- Komařice Castle

- Flag Coat of arms

- Location in the Czech Republic
- Coordinates: 48°52′43″N 14°32′44″E
- Country: Czech Republic
- Region: South Bohemian
- District: České Budějovice
- First mentioned: 1346

Area
  - Total: 10.29 km^{2} (3.97 sq mi)
- Elevation: 460 m (1,510 ft)

Population (2026-01-01)
  - Total: 364
  - Density: 35.4/km^{2} (91.6/sq mi)
- Time zone: UTC+1 (CET)
  - Summer (DST): UTC+2 (CEST)
- Postal code: 373 14
- Website: www.komarice.cz

Komařice is a municipality and village in České Budějovice District in the South Bohemian Region of the Czech Republic. It has about 400 inhabitants.

Komařice lies approximately 12 kilometres (7 mi) south-east of České Budějovice and 135 km (84 mi) south of Prague.

== Administrative division ==
Komařice consists of four municipal parts (in brackets population according to the 2021 census):

- Komařice (196)
- Pašinovice (76)
- Sedlo (52)
- Stradov (31)

== History ==
The first written mention of Komařice is from 1346.

== Demographics ==
Historical population
Year	Pop.	±%
1869	725	—
1880	842	+16.1%
1890	829	−1.5%
1900	817	−1.4%
1910	864	+5.8%
1921	753	−12.8%
1930	722	−4.1%
1950	509	−29.5%
1961	487	−4.3%
1970	387	−20.5%
1980	352	−9.0%
1991	267	−24.1%
2001	243	−9.0%
2011	287	+18.1%
2021	355	+23.7%
Source: Censuses
