= Gratzen Mountains =

Mountain range along the border of the Czech Republic and Austria

- Location within Czech Republic Location within Austria

Highest point
- Peak: Viehberg
- Elevation: 1,112 m (3,648 ft)

Geography
- State(s): Czech Republic, Upper Austria and Lower Austria
- Range coordinates: 48°33′37″N 14°37′24″E

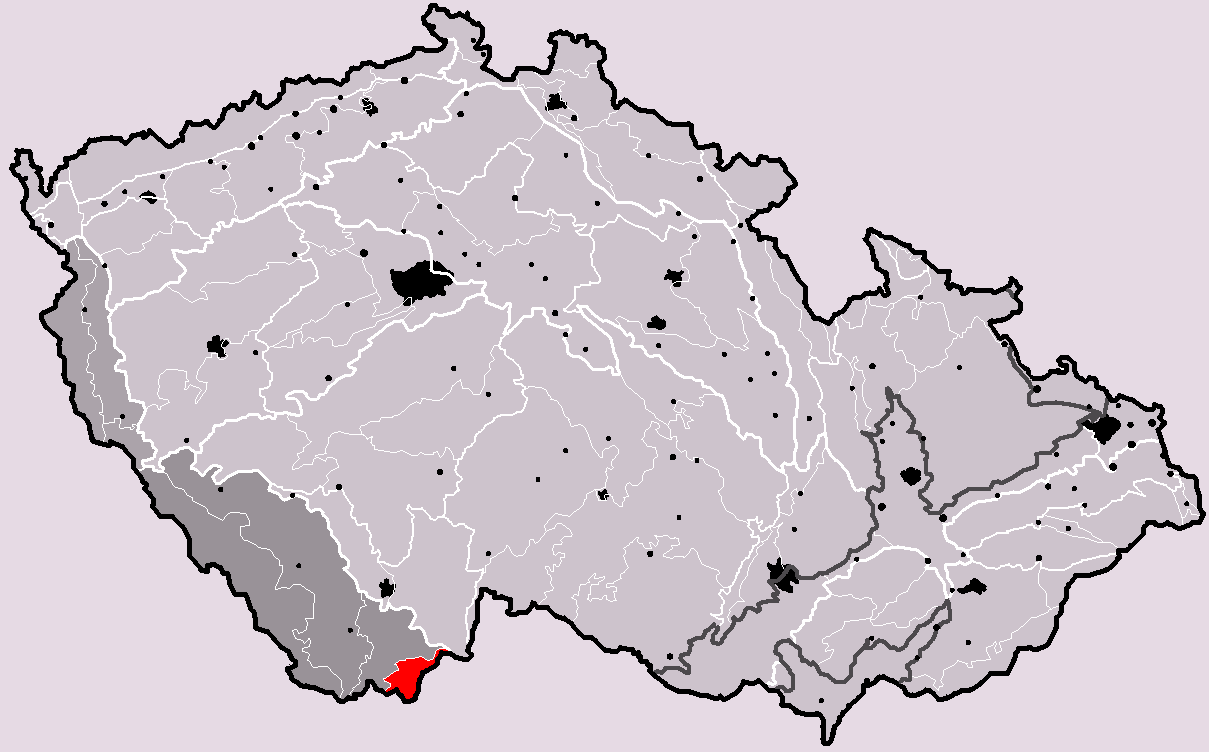
The Gratzen Mountains on the Czech side of the border

The Gratzen Mountains (German: Gratzener Bergland or, more rarely, Gratzener Gebirge; Czech: Novohradské hory) are part of the Bohemian Massif and run along either side of the border between the Czech Republic and the Austrian states of Upper and Lower Austria.

== Geography ==
The low mountain range covers an area of about 20 × 30 km and lies roughly within the triangle formed by the towns of České Budějovice, Freistadt and Gmünd.

- The Bohemian part of the range, known locally as the Novohradské hory, runs from Nové Hrady (German: Gratzen) – via Benešov nad Černou (German: Beneschau) to Horní Dvořiště (Oberhaid) on the Upper Austrian border.
- The Austrian part, the Freiwald, runs from Unterhaid/Leopoldschlag eastwards and crosses near Sandl – south of the tripoints – the border between Mühlviertel and Waldviertel districts. There, the Weinsberg Forest branches off, while the main chain swings north to the Tischstein and Nebelstein. In all the summit region approximates the shape of an ellipse and forms the northern boundary of the Granite and Gneiss Highland.

Its highest mountain is the Viehberg near Sandl which reaches 1,112 metres, but another 16 mountains exceed 1,000 metres in height. Of these, 13 lie on Austrian soil and 3 in Bohemia.

The area of the mountains on the Czech side of the border is 162 km². Their highest point is the Kamenec (Steinberg, 1,072 m n.m.) in the Pohorská foothills and in the municipality of Pohorská Ves.

The Freiwald is a major part of the natural region of the Freiwald and Weinsberg Forest.

The Lower Austrian part of the Freiwald is defined as a rural subregion (Teilraum) according to the conservation concept of the state.

After die Wende, a nature park was established called the Novohradské hory with many natural attractions like the Terčino údolí, Žofínský prales (Sophien-Urwald) and Hojná Voda (Heilbrunn). The region has remained largely unspoilt. As a result of its location on the Iron Curtain, the German Bohemians were forced out of the area after the Second World War and it remained inaccessible to tourists. After the border re-opened the trails were waymarked again and tourist infrastructure built.

About three quarters of the region is covered in coniferous and deciduous forest. An almost unabating wind builds up in the autumn often into strong gales.

In the Gratzen Mountains rise the Lainsitz, Malše, Pohořský potok, Strobnitz and Schwarzau rivers.

== Mountains over 1,000 m ==
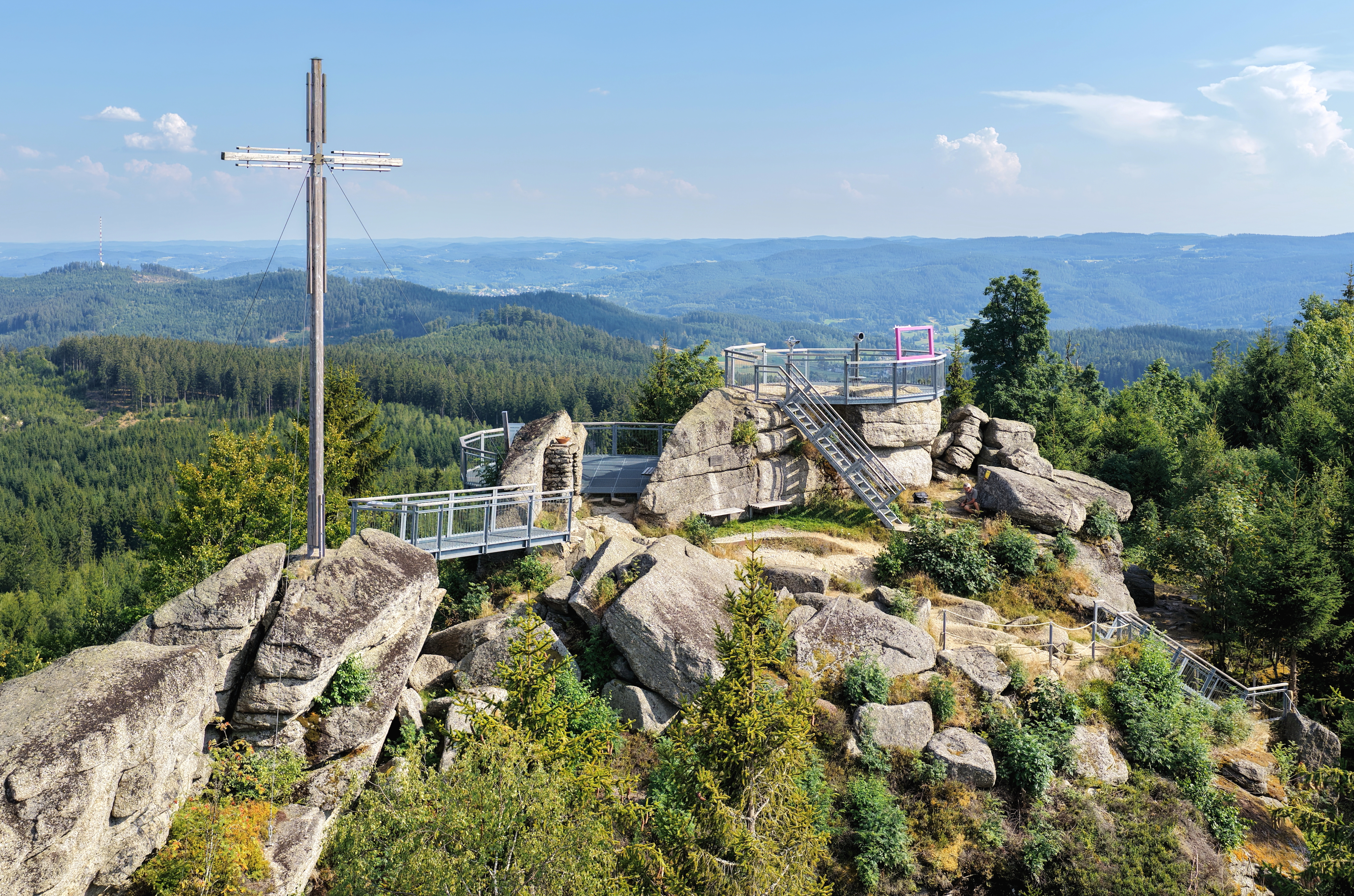
Summit area of the Nebelstein

- Viehberg, 1,112 m
- Kamenec (Steinberg), 1,072 m
- Schwarze Mauer, 1,071 m
- Tischberg, 1,063 m
- Taufelberg, c. 1042 m
- Myslivna (Farrenberg), 1,040 m
- Haubenberg, 1,036 m
- Vysoká (Hochwald), 1,034 m
- Hundsberg, 1,030 m
- Ahornstein, 1,019 m
- Nebelstein, 1,017 m
- Gattringerberg, 1,016 m
- Vorderer Schanzer Berg, c. 1,013 m
- Hinterer Schanzer Berg, 1,010 m
- Sepplberg, 1,004 m
- Bärenstein, 1,003 m
- Höllberg, 1,000 m
