= Nové Hrady (České Budějovice District) =

- Town
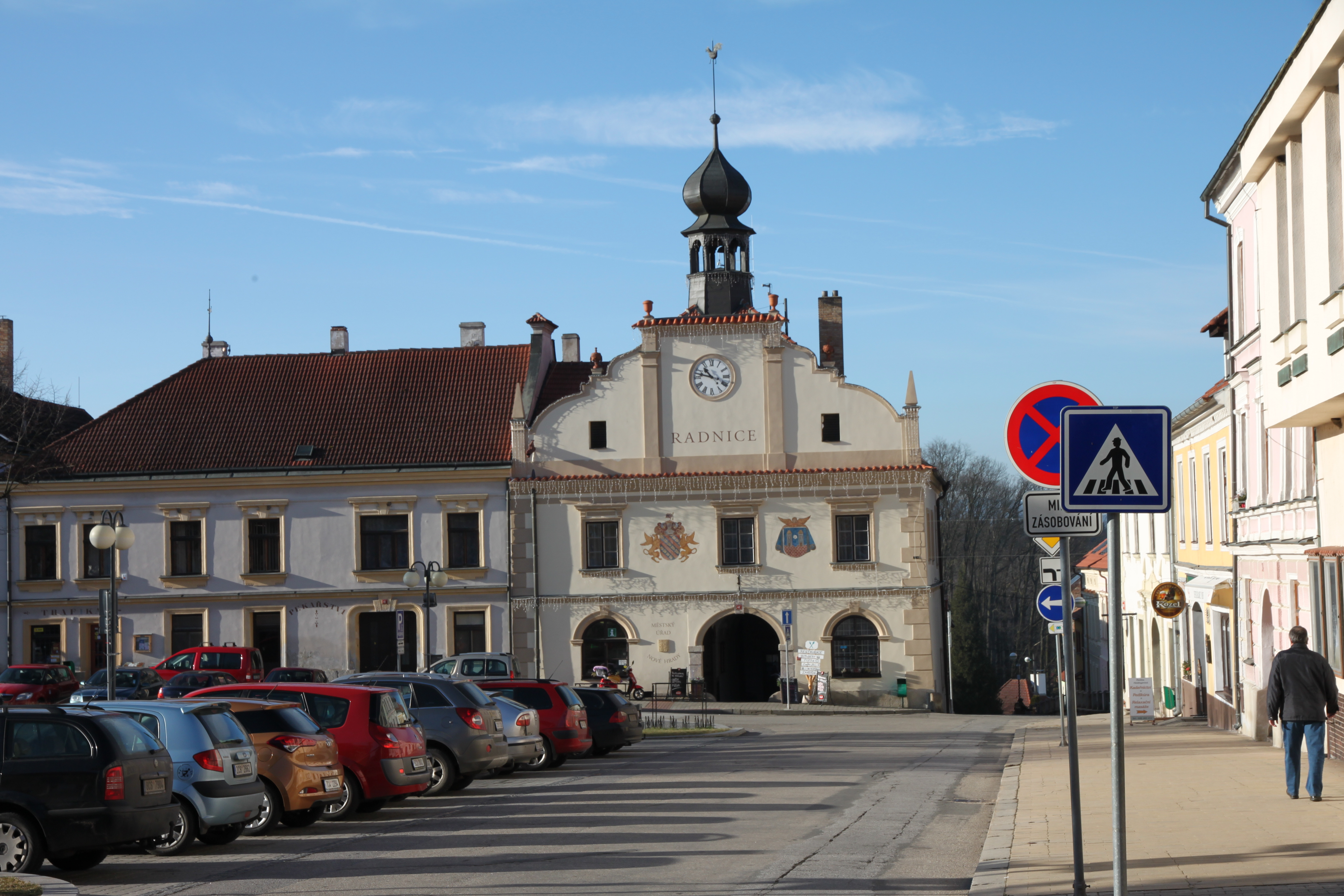
- Town square with the town hall

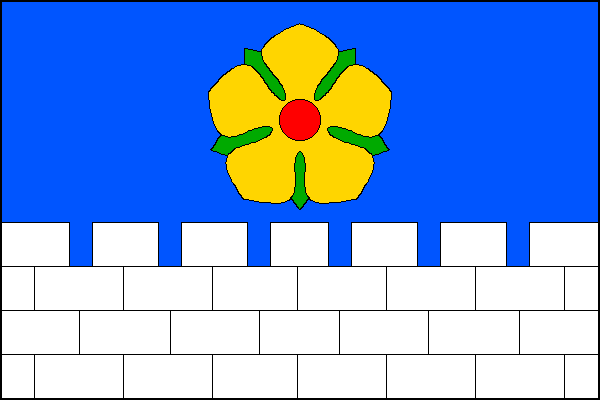
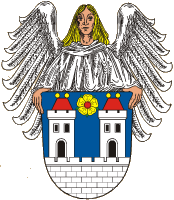
- Flag Coat of arms

- Location in the Czech Republic
- Coordinates: 48°47′23″N 14°46′42″E
- Country: Czech Republic
- Region: South Bohemian
- District: České Budějovice
- First mentioned: 1279

Government
  - Mayor: Vladimír Hokr

Area
  - Total: 79.73 km^{2} (30.78 sq mi)
- Elevation: 541 m (1,775 ft)

Population (2026-01-01)
  - Total: 2,432
  - Density: 30.50/km^{2} (79.00/sq mi)
- Time zone: UTC+1 (CET)
  - Summer (DST): UTC+2 (CEST)
- Postal code: 373 33
- Website: www.novehrady.cz

Nové Hrady (Czech pronunciation: [ˈnovɛː ˈɦradɪ]; German: Gratzen) is a town in České Budějovice District in the South Bohemian Region of the Czech Republic. It has about 2,400 inhabitants. The town is located on the Stropnice River in the Gratzen Mountains.

Nové Hrady became a town in 1368. The historic town centre is well preserved and is protected as an urban monument zone. Among the main landmarks of the town are the Nové Hrady Castle and Nové Hrady Chateau.

== Administrative division ==
Nové Hrady consists of eight municipal parts (in brackets population according to the 2021 census):

- Nové Hrady (1,887)
- Byňov (238)
- Nakolice (36)
- Obora (12)
- Štiptoň (72)
- Údolí (162)
- Veveří (2)
- Vyšné (33)

== Etymology ==
The name means 'new castles' in Czech.

== Geography ==
Nové Hrady is located about 30 kilometres (19 mi) southeast of České Budějovice, on the Czech–Austrian border. It lies in the Gratzen Mountains (Czech: Novohradské Hory), which are named after the town. The highest peaks are Vyhlídka at 720 m (2,360 ft) above sea level and Veveří at 617 m (2,024 ft). The highest point of the municipal territory overall is on the border with Austria in the Gratzen Mountains with an altitude of 825 m (2,707 ft).

The Stropnice River flows through the town. The municipal territory is rich in fishponds, the establishment of which has a long tradition here. The largest ponds are Byňovský rybník (with an area of 69.7 ha (172 acres)), Nakolický rybník and Kachní rybník.

== History ==
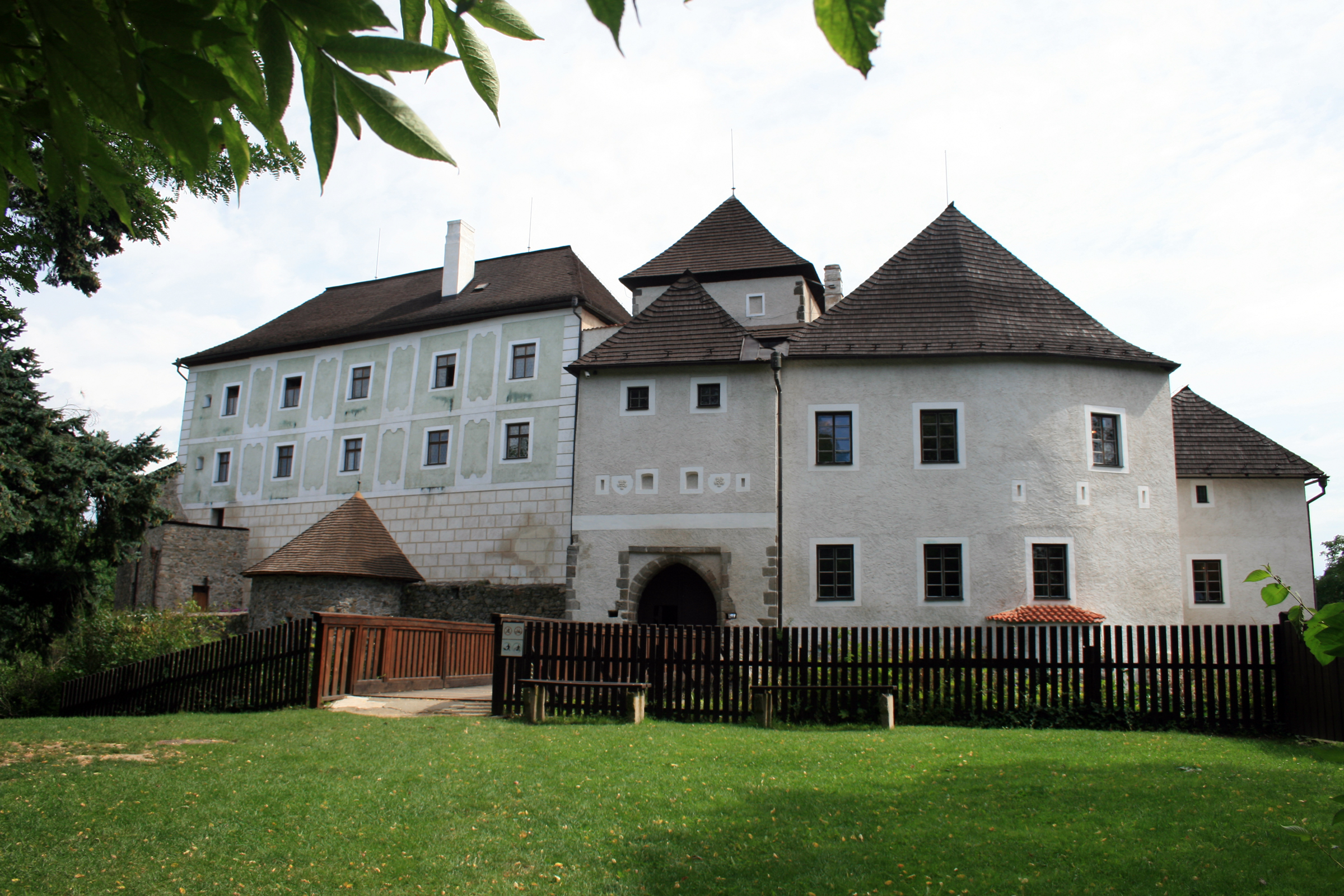
Nové Hrady Castle

The first written mention of Nové Hrady is from 1279. It was founded as a guard point at the entrance to the Kingdom of Bohemia. Later an important manor house was established here, near which a settlement with a predominance of German-speaking population raised.

At the beginning of the 14th century, Nové Hrady was a property of the Lords of Landštejn. In 1359, they sold the estate to the Rosenberg family, who significantly extended the estate. In 1368, Nové Hrady became a town with privileges similar to royal towns. In 1425, the town and the castle were conquered and burned down by the Hussites. Nové Hrady recovered ten years later. In 1488, Vladislaus II gave the town new privileges and confirmed its coat of arms.

In 1589, during the rule of William of Rosenberg, the first glassworks was established and until the 19th century, many other were established. In the late 16th century, Jakub Krčín worked here and established new ponds. In 1611, Nové Hrady was inherited by Jan Jiří of Schwamberg. The town was conquered, looted and burned down during the Thirty Years' War in 1619, but the castle survived. In 1620, Charles Bonaventure, Count of Bucquoy acquired the castle by negotiating, and the Nové Hrady estate was donated to him by Emperor Ferdinand II for his services. Since then until the establishment of an independent municipality in 1848, Nové Hrady was owned by the Lords of Bucquoy.

== Demographics ==
Historical population

Year	Pop.	±%
1869	4,566	—
1880	4,900	+7.3%
1890	4,999	+2.0%
1900	4,997	−0.0%
1910	4,642	−7.1%

Year	Pop.	±%
1921	4,375	−5.8%
1930	4,086	−6.6%
1950	2,221	−45.6%
1961	2,452	+10.4%
1970	2,373	−3.2%

Year	Pop.	±%
1980	2,470	+4.1%
1991	2,622	+6.2%
2001	2,602	−0.8%
2011	2,513	−3.4%
2021	2,442	−2.8%

Source: Censuses

== Transport ==
Nové Hrady shares the road border crossing Nové Hrady / Pyhrabruck with Austria.

Nové Hrady is located on the railway line České Budějovice–České Velenice.

== Sights ==
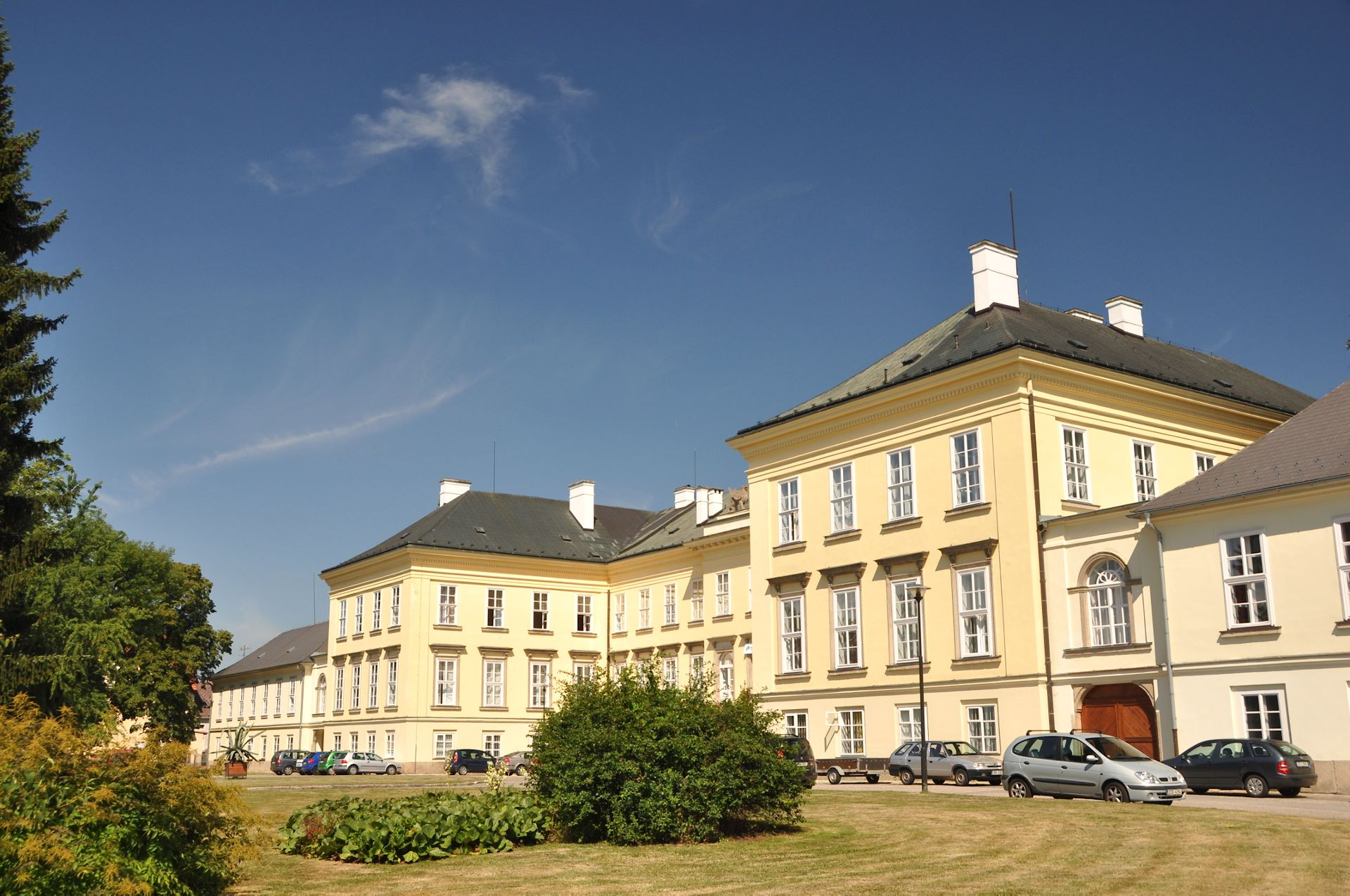
Nové Hrady Chateau

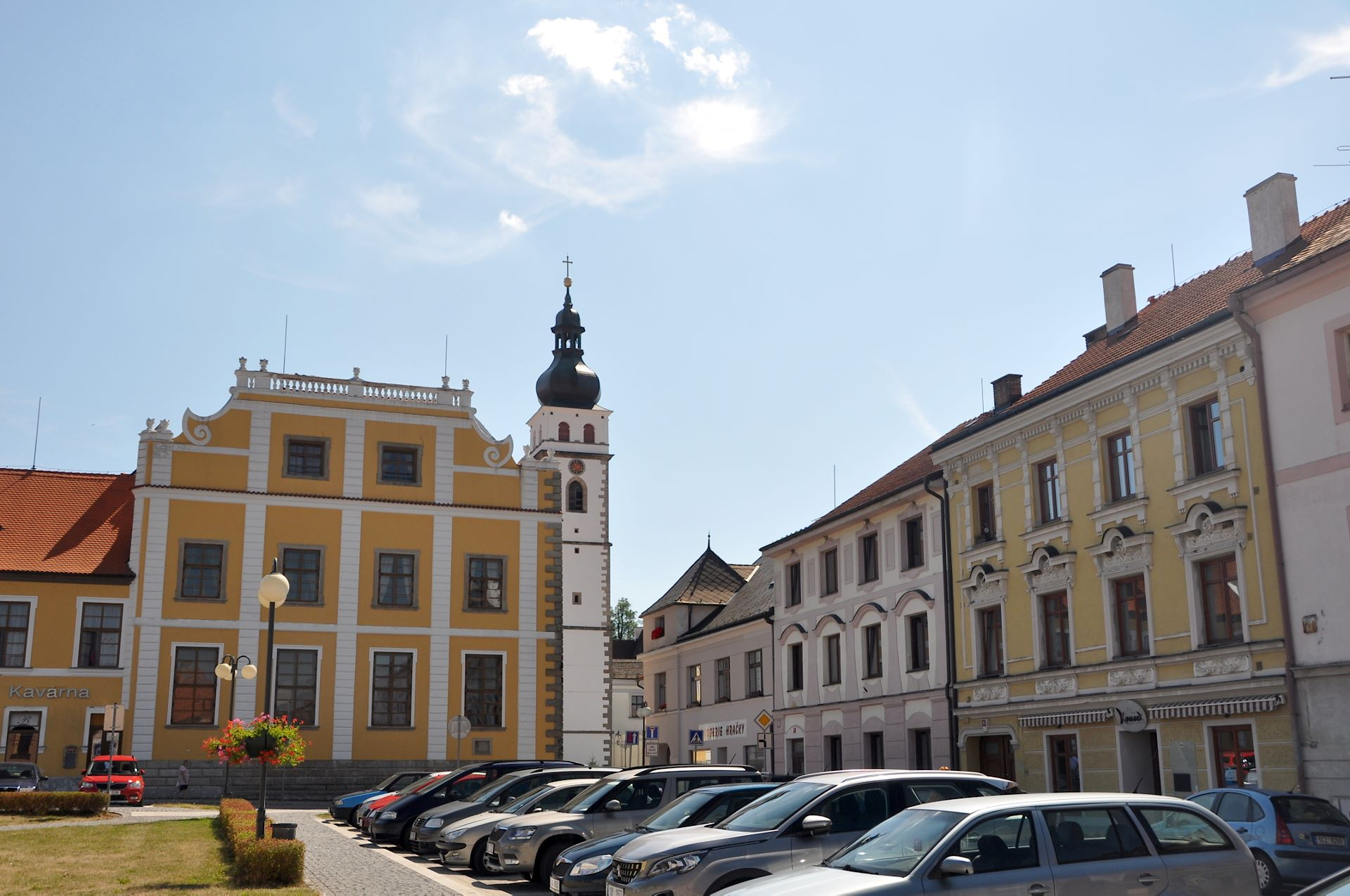
Part of the Bucquoy Residence and Church of Saints Peter and Paul

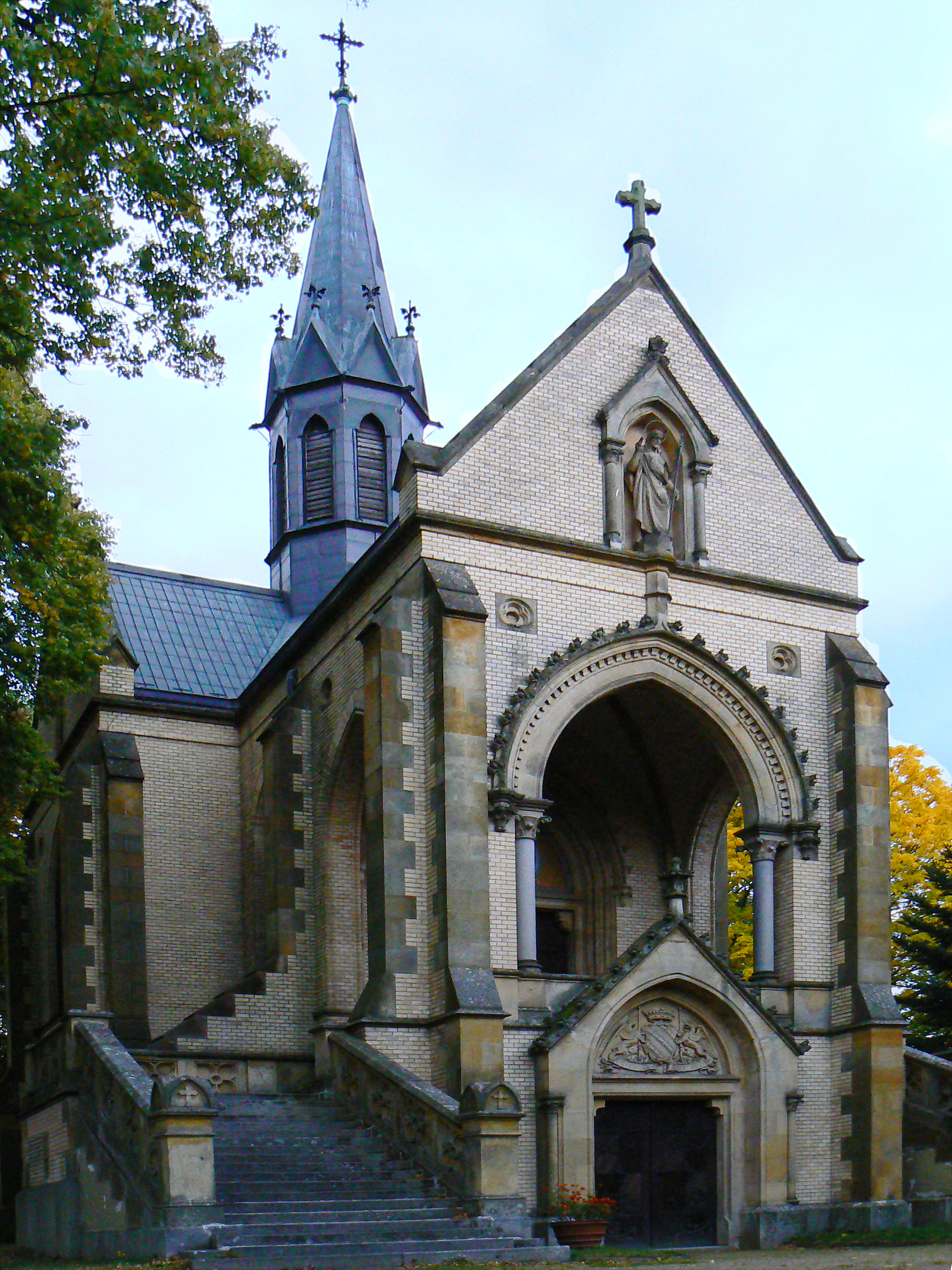
Bucquoy Tomb

The Nové Hrady Castle was built in the first half of 13th century. It was damaged in 1573 by a gunpowder explosion and in 1590 by an earthquake. Complete demolition was considered, but only the ruins of the massive bergfried and the adjacent palace were demolished. The rest of the castle complex was repaired and newly fortified according to the design of the Italian architect Antonio Canevallo. The castle lost its function of the aristocratic residence in 1635 and in the following centuries it was used as a library, archive, administration and housing for officials. Today it is owned by the state. Since 2000, it has been open to the public and offers guided tours.

The Nové Hrady Chateau is an Empire castle, built in 1801–1810. Adjacent to both castles is an extensive castle park. It was founded as a Baroque garden, which was changed to an English landscape park in the second half of the 18th century.

The town hall is among the main landmarks of the town square. It is a Renaissance building, first mentioned in 1593. It was rebuilt in the Baroque style in 1745.

The second important monument on the town square is the Bucquoy Residence. It is a large Baroque complex. It was built in 1634–1635 as the new residence for the Bucquoy family. They lived here until 1806, when the Nové Hrady Chateau was being built.

The Church of Saints Peter and Paul is a late Gothic church with many Renaissance elements from the 16th century. From the 17th century, it served both as a parish church and as a monastery church. Next to the church is the Monastery of Divine Mercy, built for the Servite Order in the early Baroque style in 1678–1685. The order was active here until 1945 and in 1990s–2005. It is still used for religious and cultural purposes.

A notable monument connected with the Bucquoy family is the Bucquoy Tomb. It was built in the pseudo-Gothic style in 1902–1904. Until the tomb was built, family members were buried in the family tomb founded by Countess Maria Magdalena in the Church of Saints Peter and Paul in the 17th century.

Other monuments and tourist destinations in the town include the town museum; a former tannery, now a gallery; a Baroque pharmacy, today a café; a forge from the beginning of the 18th century, which today houses a blacksmith's museum; Zevl's Mill, today a museum focused on milling and agriculture; and Open-air museum of the Iron Curtain.

== Notable people ==
- Johann Ritter von Oppolzer (1808–1871), medical doctor
- Ignaz Kreidl (1869–1947), Austrian-American chemist and industrialist
- Robert Martinek (1889–1944), Austrian general
- Franz Schafranek (1930–1991), Austrian theatre director
