= Římov Reservoir =

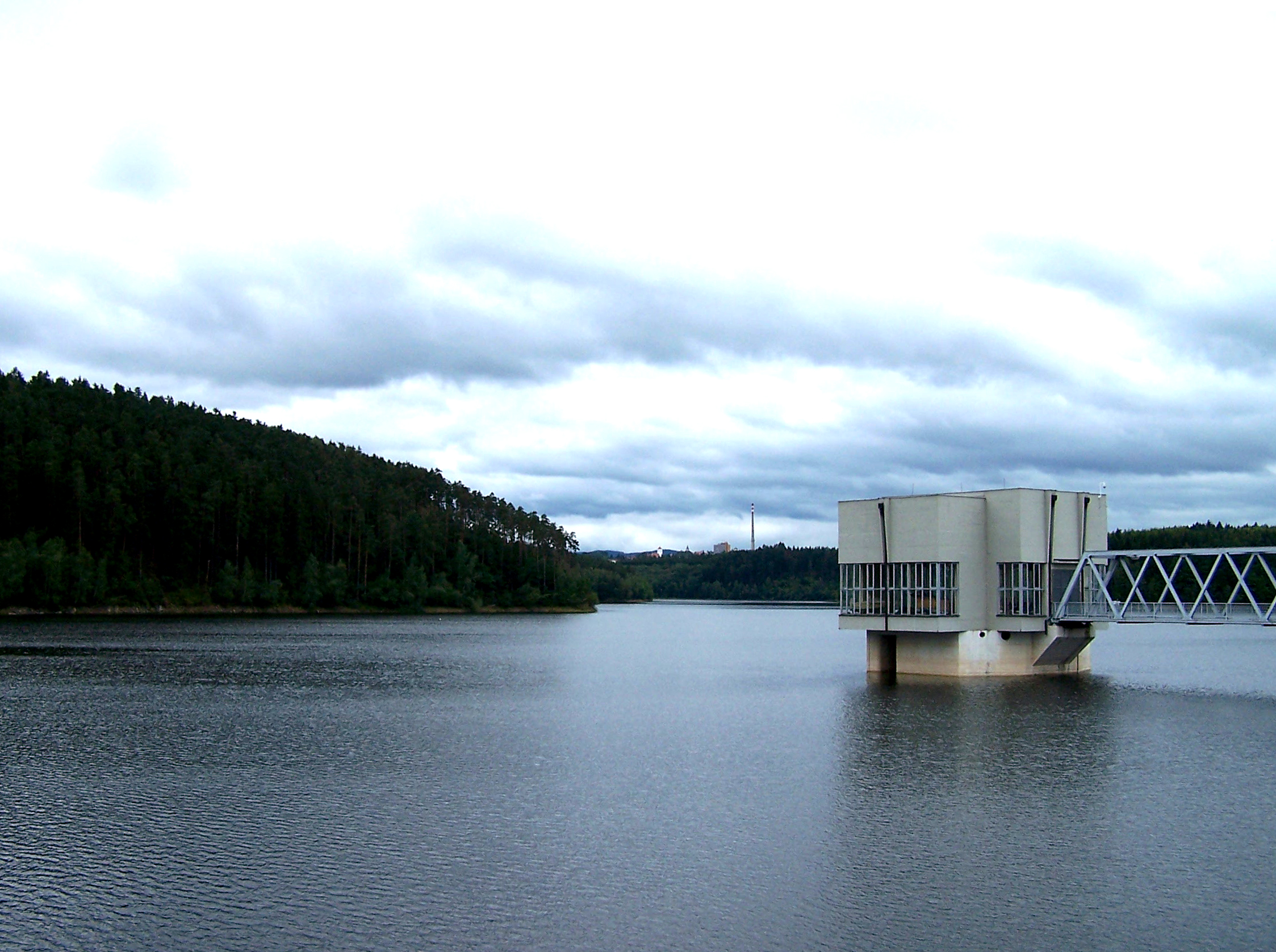
- Římov Reservoir

- Location within Czech Republic
- Coordinates: 48.83416°N 14.48148°E
- Type: Artificial lake
- Surface area: 210 hectares (520 acres)

Římov Reservoir (Czech: vodní nádrž Římov) is a reservoir in České Budějovice District.

== See also ==
- List of dams and reservoirs in the Czech Republic
