= Kváskovice =

- Municipality
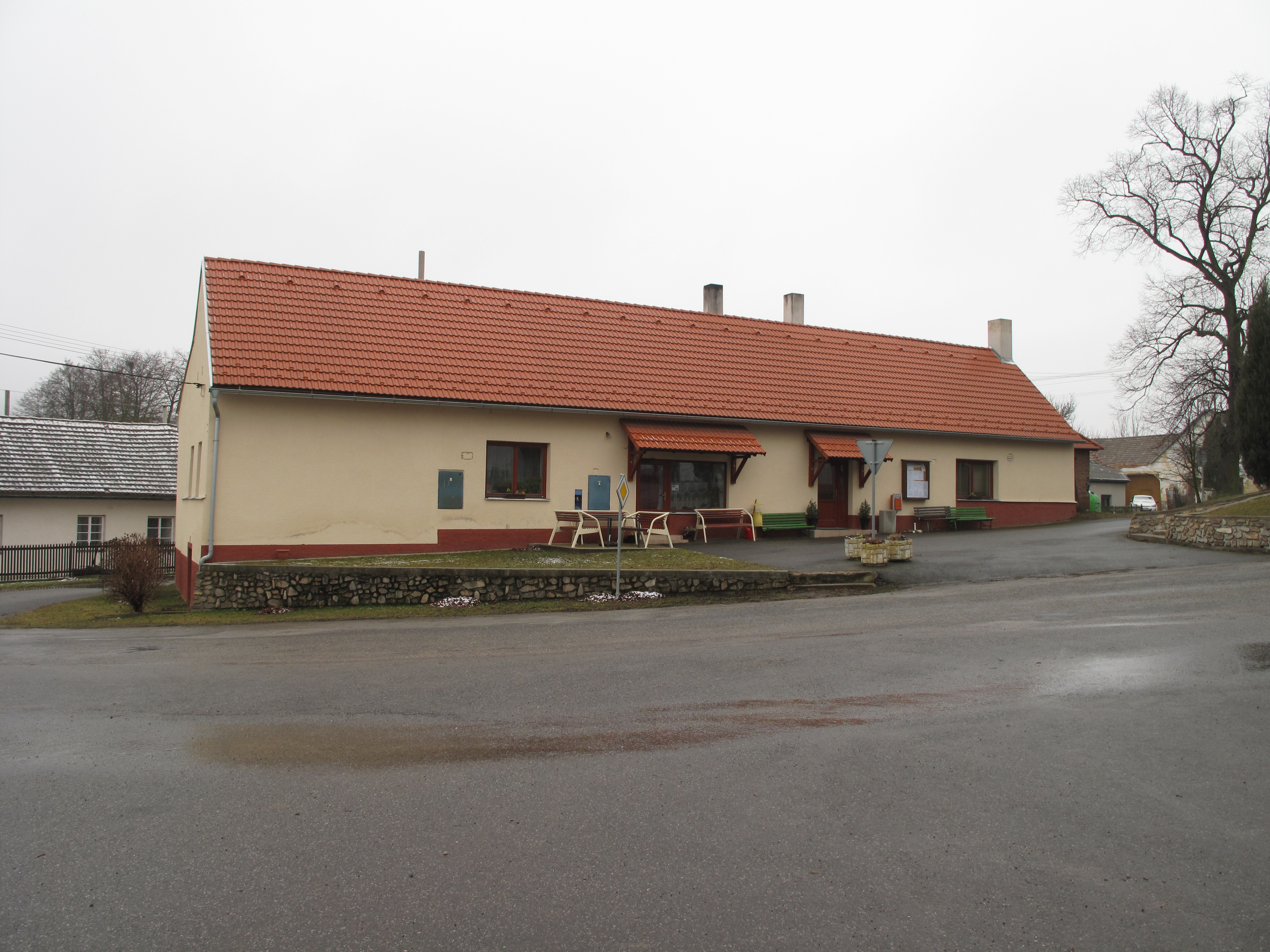
- Municipal office

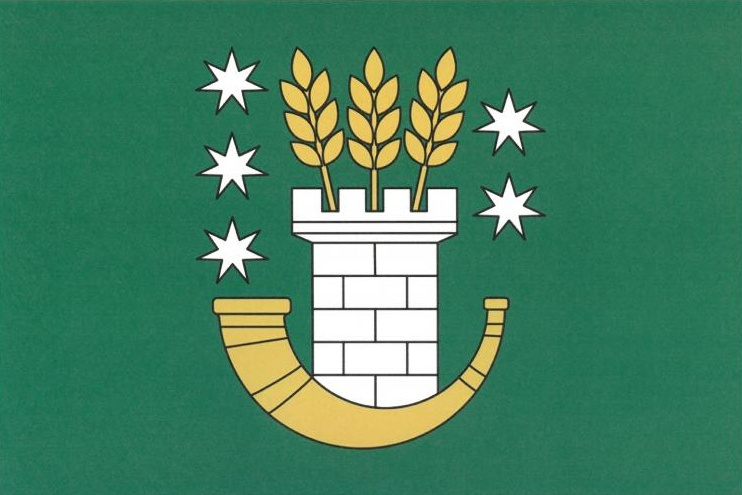
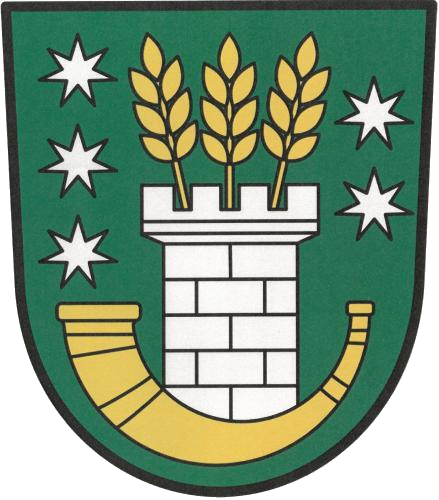
- Flag Coat of arms

- Location in the Czech Republic
- Coordinates: 49°11′19″N 14°0′13″E
- Country: Czech Republic
- Region: South Bohemian
- District: Strakonice
- First mentioned: 1334

Area
  - Total: 3.28 km^{2} (1.27 sq mi)
- Elevation: 483 m (1,585 ft)

Population (2026-01-01)
  - Total: 115
  - Density: 35.1/km^{2} (90.8/sq mi)
- Time zone: UTC+1 (CET)
  - Summer (DST): UTC+2 (CEST)
- Postal code: 386 01
- Website: www.kvaskovice.cz

Kváskovice is a municipality and village in Strakonice District in the South Bohemian Region of the Czech Republic. It has about 100 inhabitants.

== Etymology ==
The name is derived from the personal name Kvásek, meaning "the village of Kvásek's people".

== Geography ==
Kváskovice is located about 10 kilometres (6.2 mi) southeast of Strakonice and 41 km (25 mi) northwest of České Budějovice. It lies in the Bohemian Forest Foothills. The highest point is the hill Kváskovická hůrka at 571 m (1,873 ft) above sea level. The stream Cehnický potok flows through the municipality. There are several small fishponds in the municipality.

== History ==
The first written mention of Kváskovice is from 1334.

== Demographics ==
Historical population

Year	Pop.	±%
1869	231	—
1880	247	+6.9%
1890	233	−5.7%
1900	207	−11.2%
1910	198	−4.3%

Year	Pop.	±%
1921	213	+7.6%
1930	180	−15.5%
1950	140	−22.2%
1961	127	−9.3%
1970	92	−27.6%

Year	Pop.	±%
1980	85	−7.6%
1991	114	+34.1%
2001	103	−9.6%
2011	109	+5.8%
2021	107	−1.8%

Source: Censuses

== Transport ==
There are no railways or major roads passing through the municipality.

== Sights ==
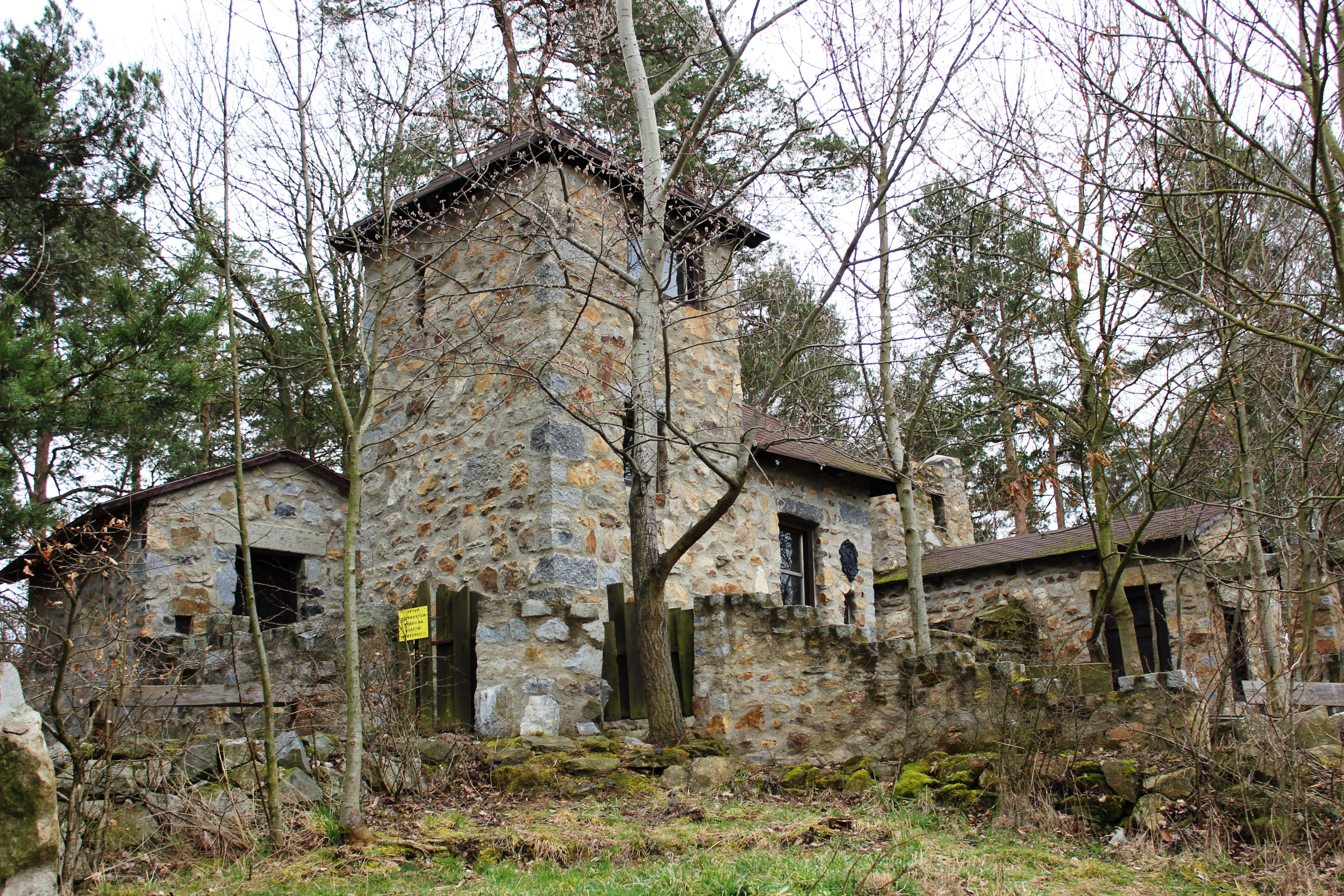
Švecburg artificial castle

The main landmark of the village centre is the Chapel of Saint John of Nepomuk from the first half of the 19th century.

The only protected cultural monument in the municipality is a rural homestead, also dating from the first half of the 19th century.

A tourist destination is Švecburg. It is a small castle built by local mason in 2007. It is freely accessible.
