= Milejovice =

- Municipality
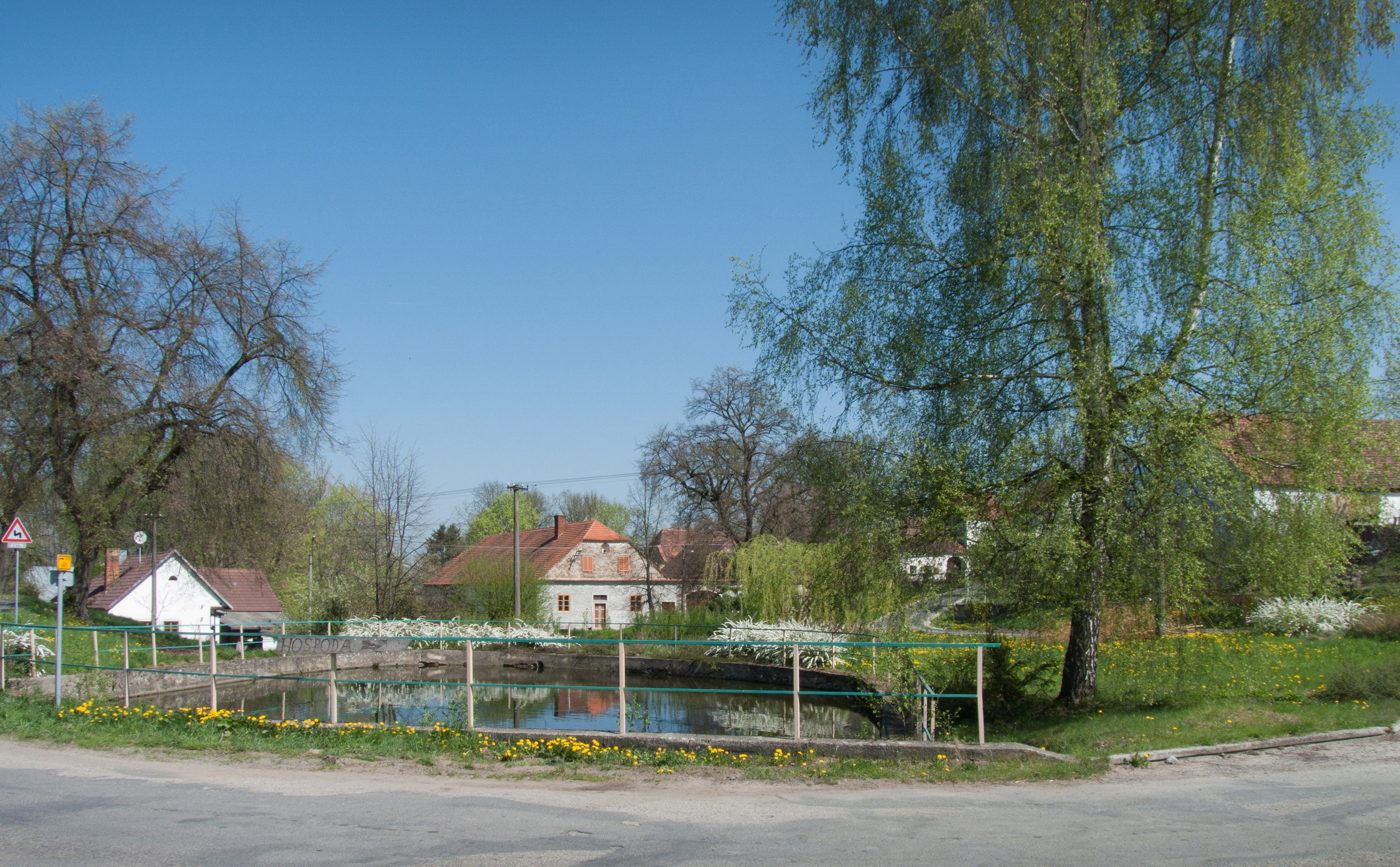
- Centre of Milejovice

- Location in the Czech Republic
- Coordinates: 49°11′17″N 13°55′48″E
- Country: Czech Republic
- Region: South Bohemian
- District: Strakonice
- First mentioned: 1315

Area
  - Total: 6.24 km^{2} (2.41 sq mi)
- Elevation: 530 m (1,740 ft)

Population (2026-01-01)
  - Total: 73
  - Density: 12/km^{2} (30/sq mi)
- Time zone: UTC+1 (CET)
  - Summer (DST): UTC+2 (CEST)
- Postal code: 387 01
- Website: www.milejovice.cz

Milejovice is a municipality and village in Strakonice District in the South Bohemian Region of the Czech Republic. It has about 70 inhabitants.

== Etymology ==
The name is derived from the personal name Milej, meaning "the village of Milej's people".

== Geography ==
Milejovice is located about 8 kilometres (5 mi) south of Strakonice and 45 km (28 mi) northwest of České Budějovice. It lies in the Bohemian Forest Foothills. The highest point is the hill Vráž at 645 m (2,116 ft) above sea level.

== History ==
The first written mention of Milejovice is from 1315.

== Demographics ==
Historical population

Year	Pop.	±%
1869	376	—
1880	374	−0.5%
1890	362	−3.2%
1900	352	−2.8%
1910	348	−1.1%

Year	Pop.	±%
1921	339	−2.6%
1930	293	−13.6%
1950	199	−32.1%
1961	179	−10.1%
1970	143	−20.1%

Year	Pop.	±%
1980	103	−28.0%
1991	69	−33.0%
2001	52	−24.6%
2011	69	+32.7%
2021	64	−7.2%

Source: Censuses

== Transport ==
There are no railways or major roads passing through the municipality.

== Sights ==
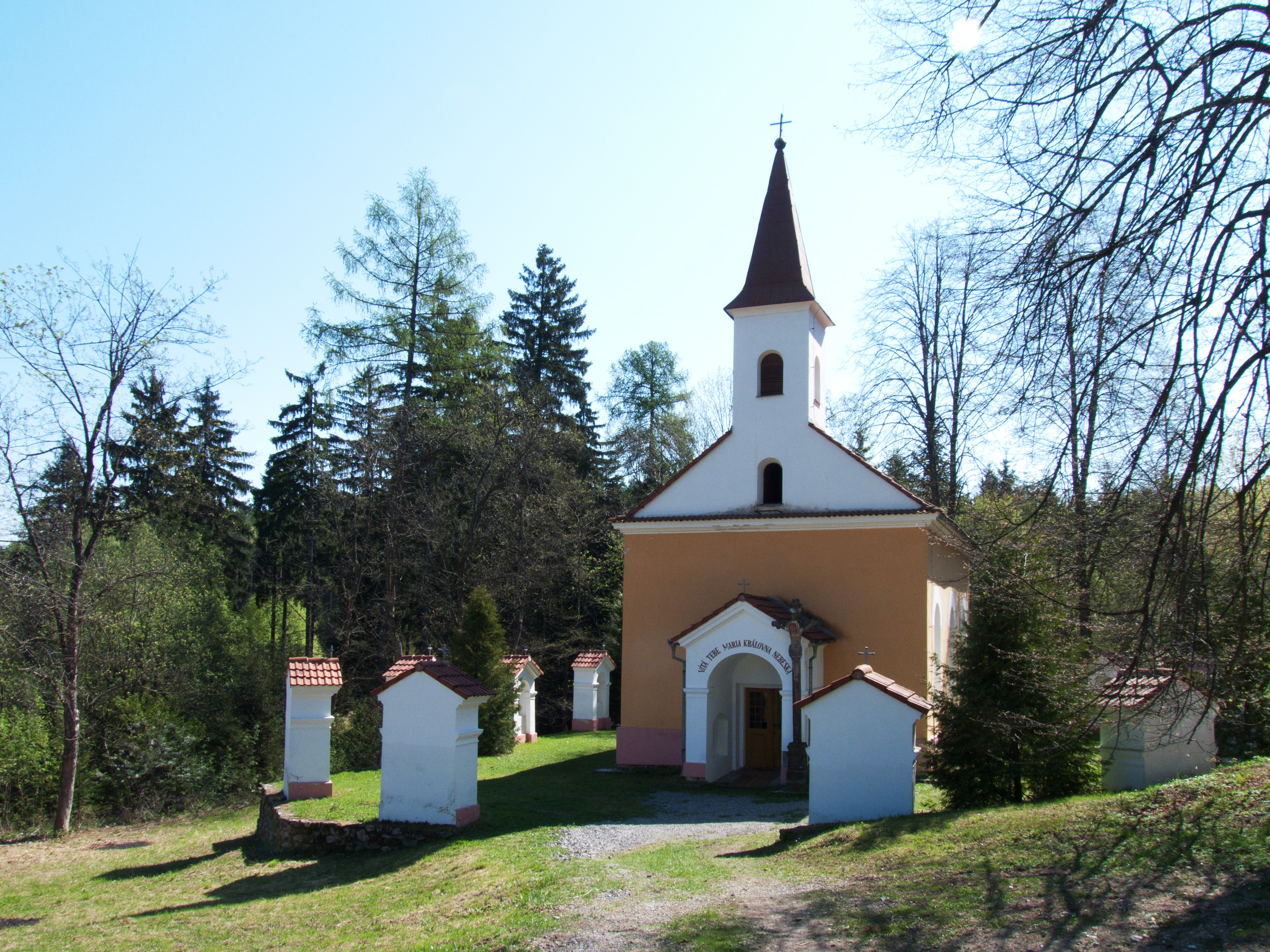
Dobrá voda pilgrimage site

In the centre of Milejovice is a chapel.

In the eastern part of the municipal territory is Dobrá voda, a pilgrimage site with the Chapel of the Most Blessed Virgin Mary and the Stations of the Cross. The chapel was built in 1889–1891 next to a well with a supposedly healing spring.
