= Kájov =

- Municipality
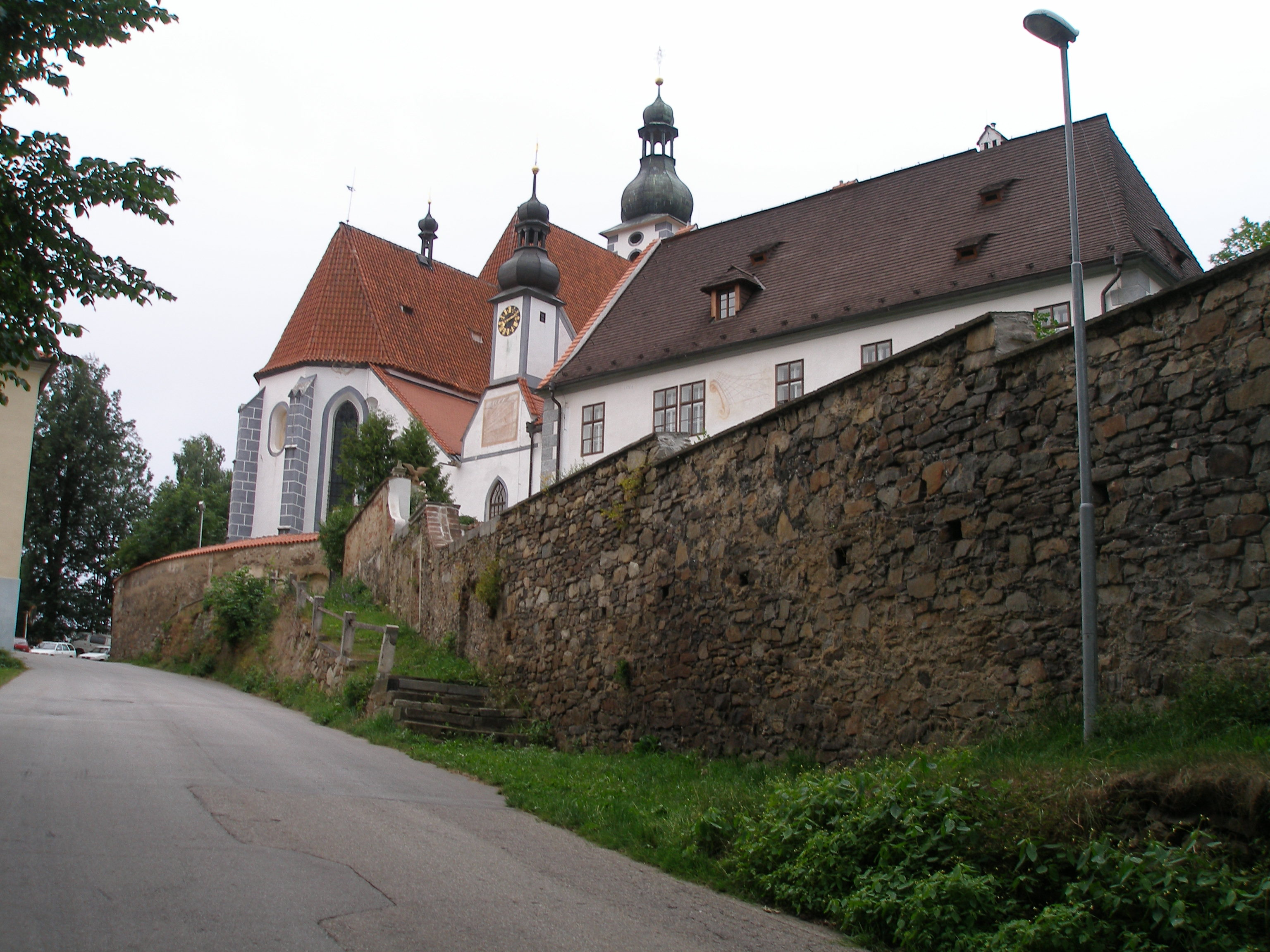
- Church of the Assumption of the Virgin Mary

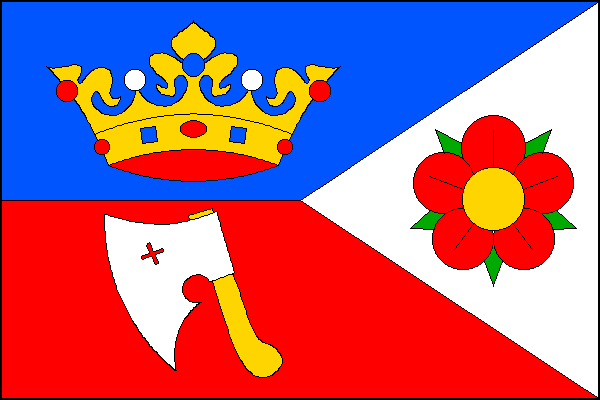
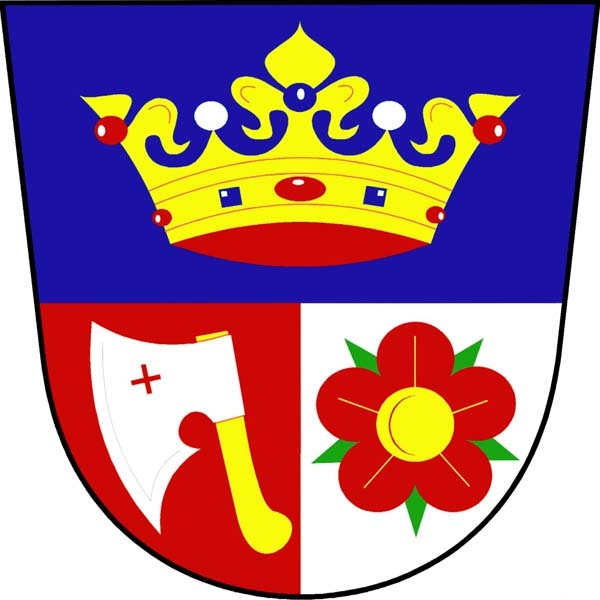
- Flag Coat of arms

- Location in the Czech Republic
- Coordinates: 48°48′39″N 14°15′31″E
- Country: Czech Republic
- Region: South Bohemian
- District: Český Krumlov
- First mentioned: 1263

Area
  - Total: 49.92 km^{2} (19.27 sq mi)
- Elevation: 540 m (1,770 ft)

Population (2026-01-01)
  - Total: 1,971
  - Density: 39.48/km^{2} (102.3/sq mi)
- Time zone: UTC+1 (CET)
  - Summer (DST): UTC+2 (CEST)
- Postal code: 382 21
- Website: www.kajov.eu

Kájov (German: Gojau) is a municipality and village in Český Krumlov District in the South Bohemian Region of the Czech Republic. It has about 2,000 inhabitants.

== Administrative division ==
Kájov consists of ten municipal parts (in brackets population according to the 2021 census):

- Kájov (1,062)
- Boletice (77)
- Kladenské Rovné (55)
- Kladné (136)
- Křenov (153)
- Lazec (22)
- Mezipotočí (63)
- Novosedly (121)
- Přelštice (26)
- Staré Dobrkovice (193)

== Etymology ==
The name Kájov is derived from the personal name Kája (a pet form of Karel), meaning "Kája's (court)".

== Geography ==
Kájov is located about 4 kilometres (2 mi) west of Český Krumlov and 24 km (15 mi) southwest of České Budějovice. It lies in the Bohemian Forest Foothills. The highest point is near the top of the mountain Kleť at 1,074 m (3,524 ft) above sea level. The Polečnice Stream flows across the municipality. The village of Kájov is situated at its the confluence with the stream Chvalšinský potok. The northern part of the municipal territory lies within the Blanský les Protected Landscape Area.

== History ==
The first written mention of Kájov, Kladné and Křenov is from 1263, when King Ottokar II donated them to the newly established monastery in Zlatá Koruna. Other villages of the municipality were first documented between 1300 and 1470. Kájov was a property of the monastery until 1785, when the monastery was abolished. From 1785, it belonged to the Český Krumlov estate.

== Demographics ==
Historical population

Year	Pop.	±%
1869	1,657	—
1880	1,669	+0.7%
1890	1,829	+9.6%
1900	1,852	+1.3%
1910	2,010	+8.5%

Year	Pop.	±%
1921	2,045	+1.7%
1930	2,366	+15.7%
1950	1,493	−36.9%
1961	1,126	−24.6%
1970	1,122	−0.4%

Year	Pop.	±%
1980	1,184	+5.5%
1991	1,166	−1.5%
2001	1,298	+11.3%
2011	1,753	+35.1%
2021	1,908	+8.8%

Source: Censuses

== Transport ==
The I/39 road (the section from Český Krumlov to Volary) runs through the municipality.

Kájov is located on the railway line České Budějovice–Nové Údolí.

== Culture ==
Kájov is known for the tradition of Marian pilgrimages, which began here in the second half of the 17th century. During the first half of the 18th century, 40,000 people took part in the pilgrimage. The tradition of the pilgrimage continues to this day and is held every year in October.

== Sights ==
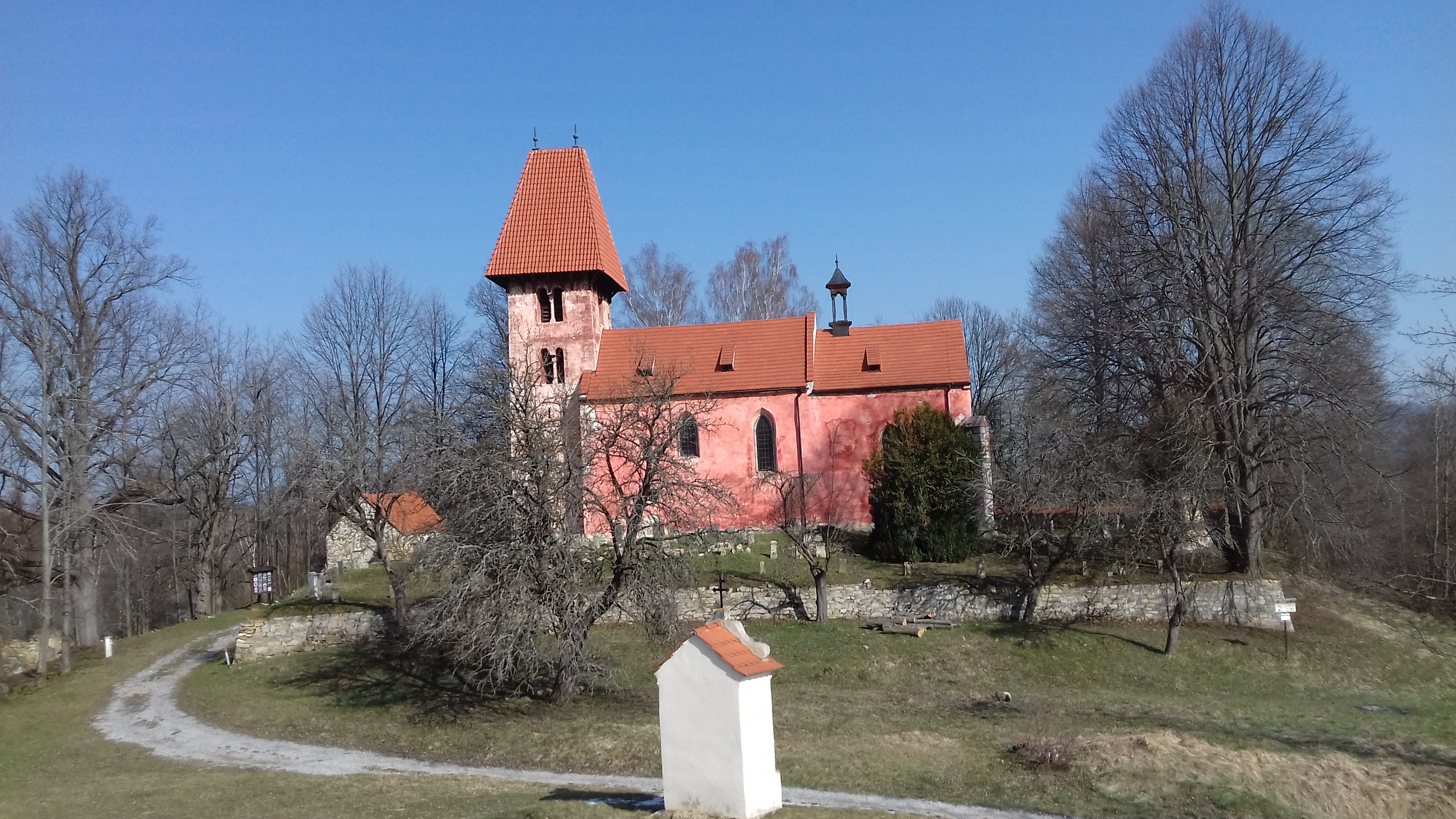
Church of Saint Nicholas

The main landmark of Kájov and one of the most important historical monuments in the region is the Church of the Assumption of the Virgin Mary. It is a significant example of medieval sacral architecture. The church and rectory were founded between 1263 and 1340. In 1474–1485, the building of the church was replaced by the current one, built in the late Gothic style. Various modifications and extensions were made in the 17th century. The church stands out for its high artistic quality and stylistic purity. For its value, the complex of the church with the rectory is protected as a national cultural monument.

The Church of Saint Nicholas is located in Boletice. It is originally a Romanesque church from the second half of the 12th century. Later it was rebuil in the Gothic and Renaissance styles, but Romanesque tower and perimeter walls of the nave were preserved to this day.
