= Křemže =

- Market town
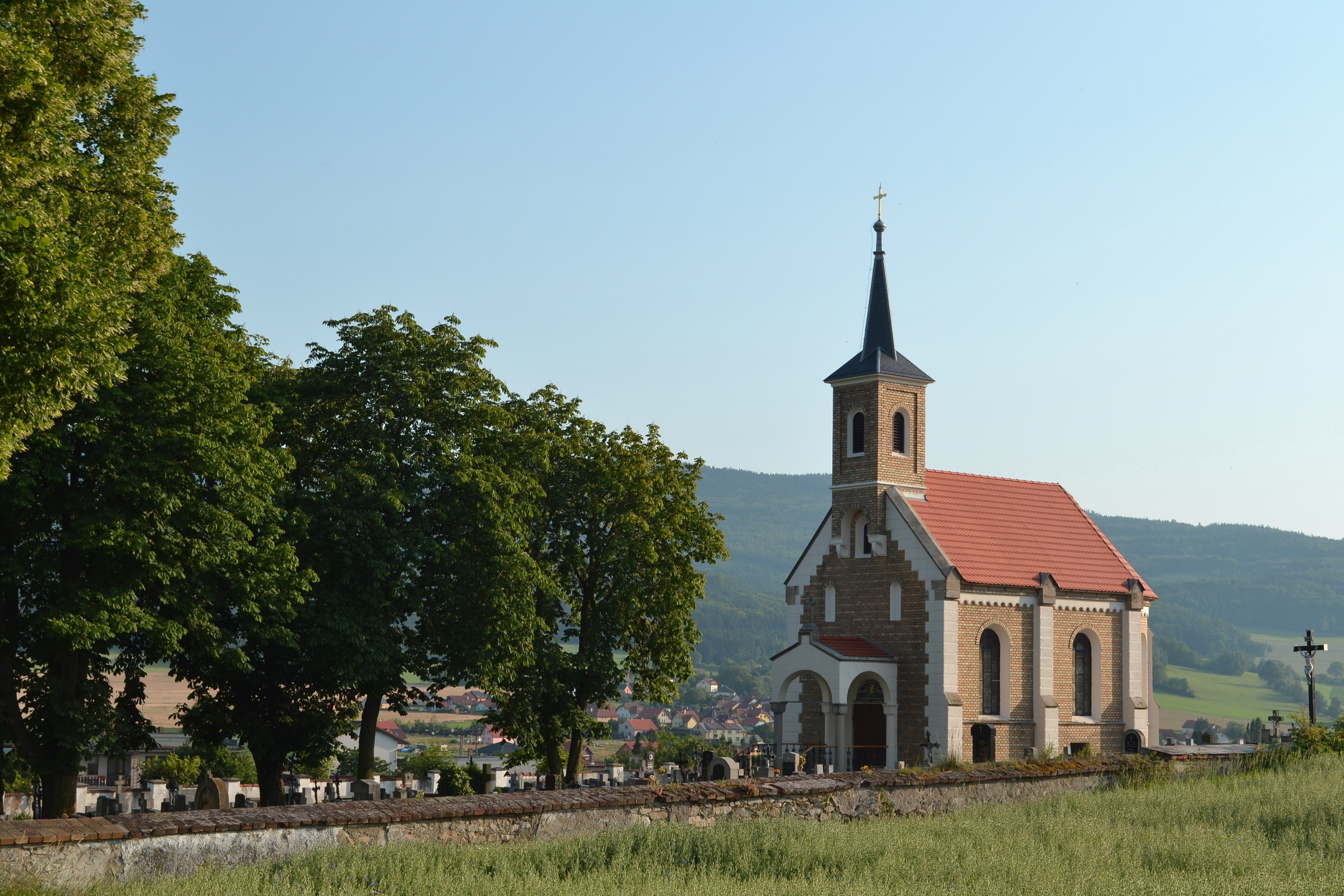
- Chapel of Saint Ursula

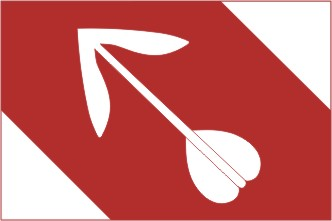
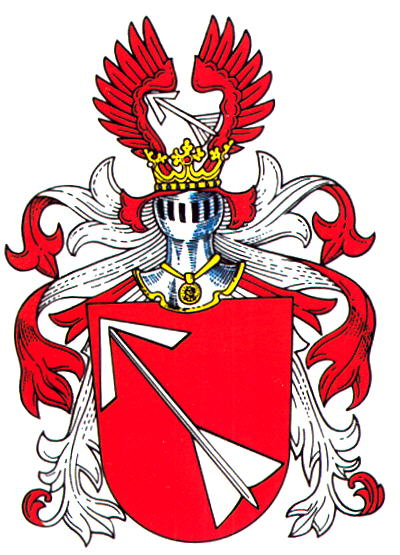
- Flag Coat of arms

- Location in the Czech Republic
- Coordinates: 48°54′18″N 14°18′20″E
- Country: Czech Republic
- Region: South Bohemian
- District: Český Krumlov
- First mentioned: 1263

Area
  - Total: 38.12 km^{2} (14.72 sq mi)
- Elevation: 521 m (1,709 ft)

Population (2026-01-01)
  - Total: 3,012
  - Density: 79.01/km^{2} (204.6/sq mi)
- Time zone: UTC+1 (CET)
  - Summer (DST): UTC+2 (CEST)
- Postal code: 382 03
- Website: www.kremze.cz

Křemže (Czech pronunciation: [ˈkr̝̊ɛmʒɛ]; German: Krems) is a market town in Český Krumlov District in the South Bohemian Region of the Czech Republic. It has about 3,000 inhabitants.

== Administrative division ==
Křemže consists of ten municipal parts (in brackets population according to the 2021 census):

- Křemže (1,328)
- Bohouškovice (43)
- Chlum (817)
- Chlumeček (43)
- Chmelná (170)
- Lhotka (81)
- Loučej (95)
- Mříč (256)
- Stupná (115)
- Vinná (11)

== Etymology ==
Křemže was initially a name of a local watercourse, and this name was transferred to the settlement. The origin of the name is unknown. There is a theory that the name is of Celtic origin and is connected to the word crem ('garlic'). This would mean that the name referred to the vegetation through which the watercourse flowed. Other theories say that the name is of Slavic origin and comes from the root krem (and is connected with the modern Czech word křemen, i.e 'quartz').

== Geography ==
Křemže is located about 10 kilometres (6 mi) north of Český Krumlov and 13 km (8 mi) southwest of České Budějovice. It lies in the Bohemian Forest Foothills. The highest point is the mountain Kleť at 1,087 m (3,566 ft) above sea level, located on the southern border of Křemže. The stream Křemžský potok flows through the market town. There are several fishponds in the municipal territory. The entire territory of Křemže lies within the Blanský les Protected Landscape Area.

== History ==
The first written mention of Křemže is from 1263. Until 1444, the village was owned by the Dubenský of Chlum family, then it was acquired by Oldřich II of Rosenberg. He sold it back to the Dubenský of Chlum family in 1451. In 1547, Křemže was inherited by the Častolár family. From 1678, the village was property of the monastery in Zlatá Koruna, which lasted until the abolishment of the monastery is 1785. Then it was merged with the Český Krumlov estate. In 1863, Křemže was promoted to a town.

== Demographics ==
Historical population

Year	Pop.	±%
1869	2,434	—
1880	2,637	+8.3%
1890	2,784	+5.6%
1900	2,880	+3.4%
1910	3,046	+5.8%

Year	Pop.	±%
1921	2,695	−11.5%
1930	2,798	+3.8%
1950	2,104	−24.8%
1961	2,258	+7.3%
1970	2,352	+4.2%

Year	Pop.	±%
1980	2,436	+3.6%
1991	2,403	−1.4%
2001	2,488	+3.5%
2011	2,717	+9.2%
2021	2,959	+8.9%

Source: Censuses

== Transport ==
Křemže is located on the railway line České Budějovice–Volary.

== Sights ==
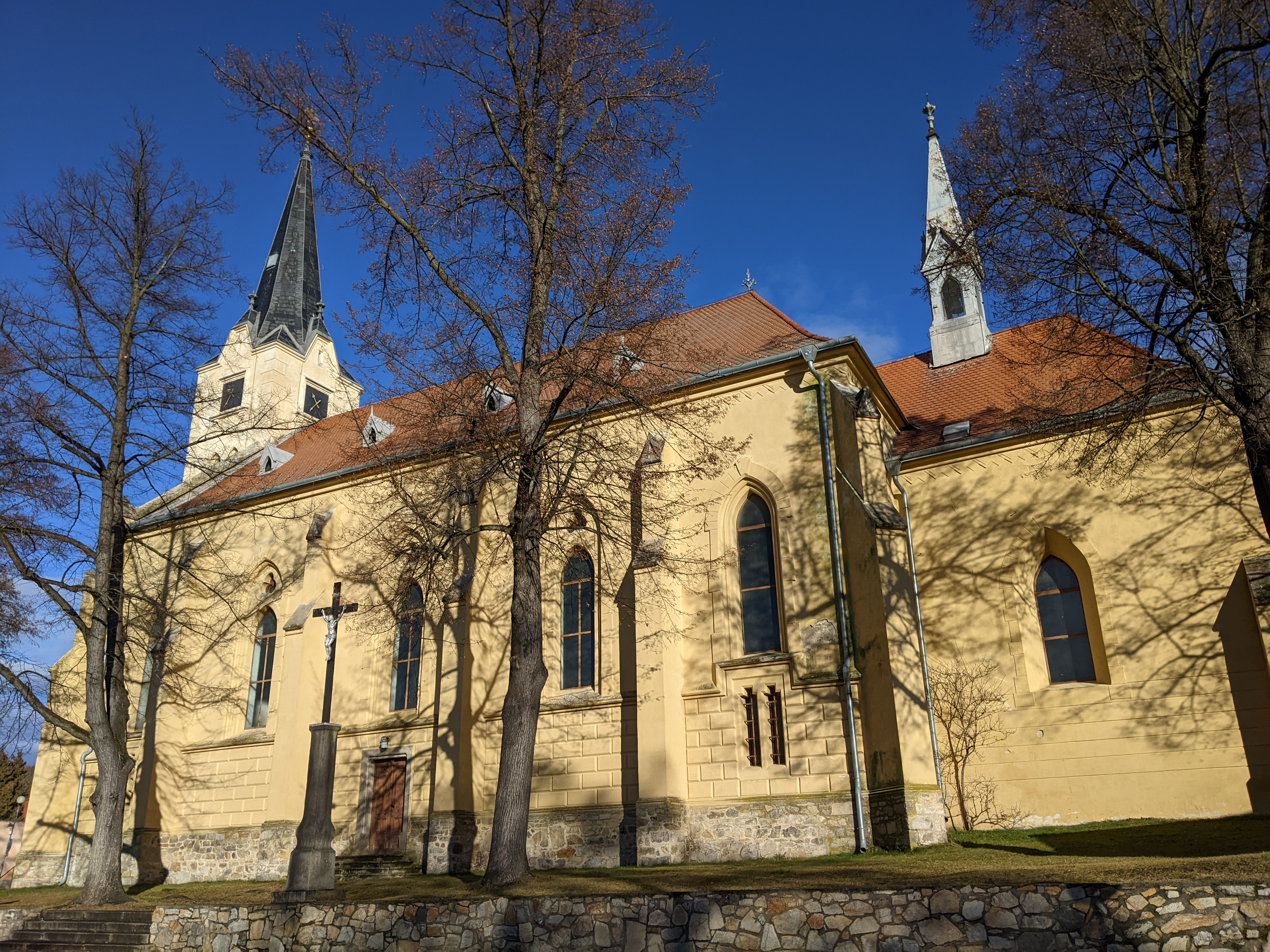
Church of St. Michael the Archangel

The main landmark of Křemže is the Church of Saint Michael the Archangel. It was probably built at the end of the 13th century. Pseudo-Gothic reconstruction took place in 1885–1887. The rectory next to the church dates from 1840 and was built after the old rectory was destroyed by fire.

The oldest stone observation tower in the Czech Republic was built on Kleť in 1825. It was built by Count Josef Schwarzenberg. The tower was built in the neo-Gothic style and is 18 metres (59 ft) high. It used to be a trigonometric point for cartographic works. In 1925, a mountain hut was built on Kleť for tourists. It contains a sundial, the highest in the Czech Republic.
