= Holubov =

- Municipality
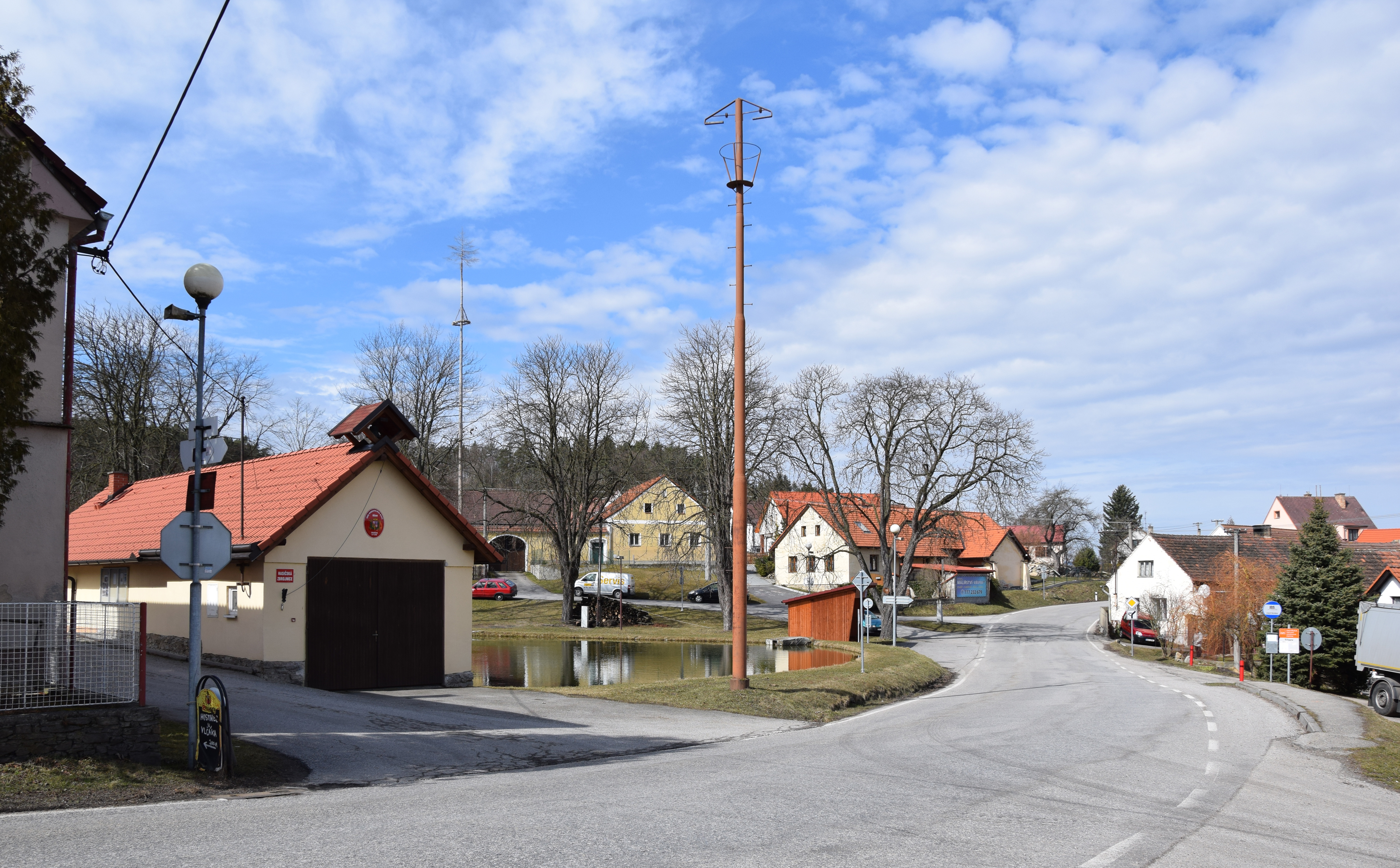
- Třísov, a part of Holubov

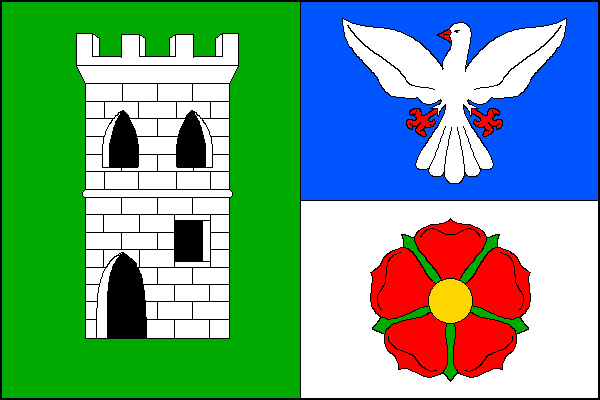
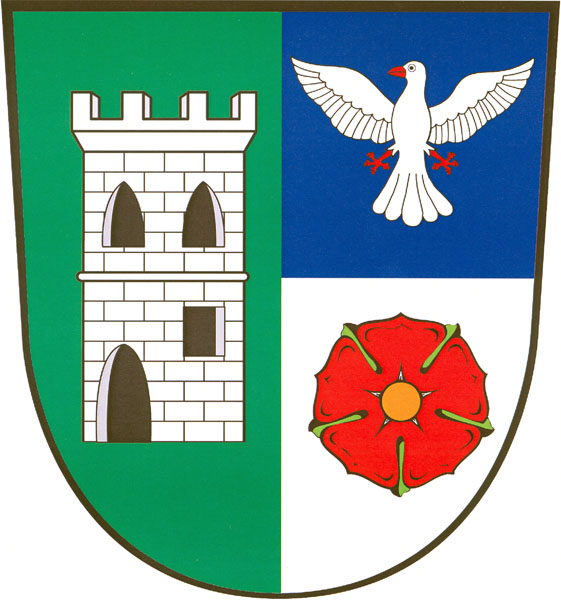
- Flag Coat of arms

- Location in the Czech Republic
- Coordinates: 48°53′24″N 14°19′16″E
- Country: Czech Republic
- Region: South Bohemian
- District: Český Krumlov
- First mentioned: 1379

Area
  - Total: 15.56 km^{2} (6.01 sq mi)
- Elevation: 512 m (1,680 ft)

Population (2026-01-01)
  - Total: 1,100
  - Density: 71/km^{2} (180/sq mi)
- Time zone: UTC+1 (CET)
  - Summer (DST): UTC+2 (CEST)
- Postal code: 382 03
- Website: www.holubov.cz

Holubov (German: Holubau) is a municipality and village in Český Krumlov District in the South Bohemian Region of the Czech Republic. It has about 1,100 inhabitants.

== Administrative division ==
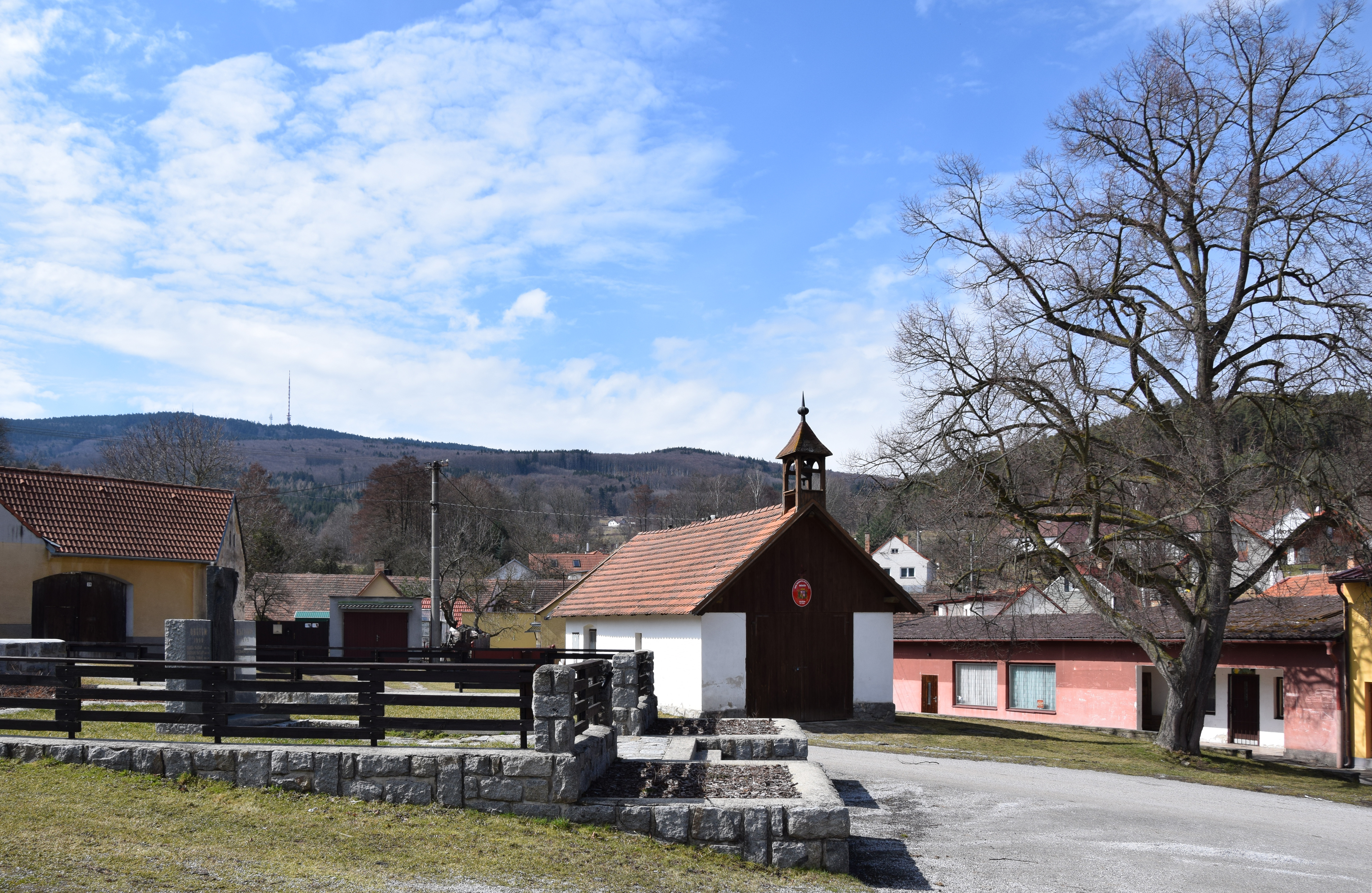
Centre of Krasetín

Holubov consists of three municipal parts (in brackets population according to the 2021 census):

- Holubov (690)
- Krasetín (177)
- Třísov (211)

== Etymology ==
The name Holubov is derived from the personal name Holub, meaning "Holub's (court)".

== Geography ==
Holubov is located about 8 kilometres (5 mi) north of Český Krumlov and 14 km (9 mi) southwest of České Budějovice. It lies in the Bohemian Forest Foothills. The highest point is on the slopes of the mountain Kleť at 922 m (3,025 ft) above sea level.

The eastern border of the municipal territory is formed by the Vltava River. In the centre of Holubov is the pond Holubovský rybník, used for leisure activities. The whole municipality lies in the Blanský les Protected Landscape Area.

== History ==
The Celts lived in the area from about 200–400 BC, and in about 60 BC they founded an oppidum in Třísov. they left the place in around 60 BC being pushed out from here by migrating Marcomanni tribe. Between 4th and 7th centuries, the Slavic tribes settled here.

The first written mentions of Holubov and Třísov are from 1379, the first mention of Krasetín is from 1372. The area was owned by Vítkovci and then by the Rosenberg family as a part of the Dívčí kámen Castle estate. In 1383, a manor house called Holubův is documented here, and it probably gave the name to the village.

In the 19th century started industrialisation of Holubov. From 1841 to 1874, an iron-producing factory was here. In 1891, the railway to České Budějovice and Volary was built.

== Demographics ==
Historical population

Year	Pop.	±%
1869	769	—
1880	882	+14.7%
1890	974	+10.4%
1900	1,076	+10.5%
1910	1,173	+9.0%

Year	Pop.	±%
1921	1,161	−1.0%
1930	1,138	−2.0%
1950	945	−17.0%
1961	998	+5.6%
1970	957	−4.1%

Year	Pop.	±%
1980	895	−6.5%
1991	867	−3.1%
2001	943	+8.8%
2011	1,020	+8.2%
2021	1,078	+5.7%

Source: Censuses

== Economy ==
Industry in Holubov is represented by the Grafobal Bohemia company, which makes paper products (boxes). The municipality is otherwise dependent on agriculture and tourism.

== Transport ==
Holubov is located on the railway line České Budějovice–Stožec-Nové Údolí.

== Sights ==
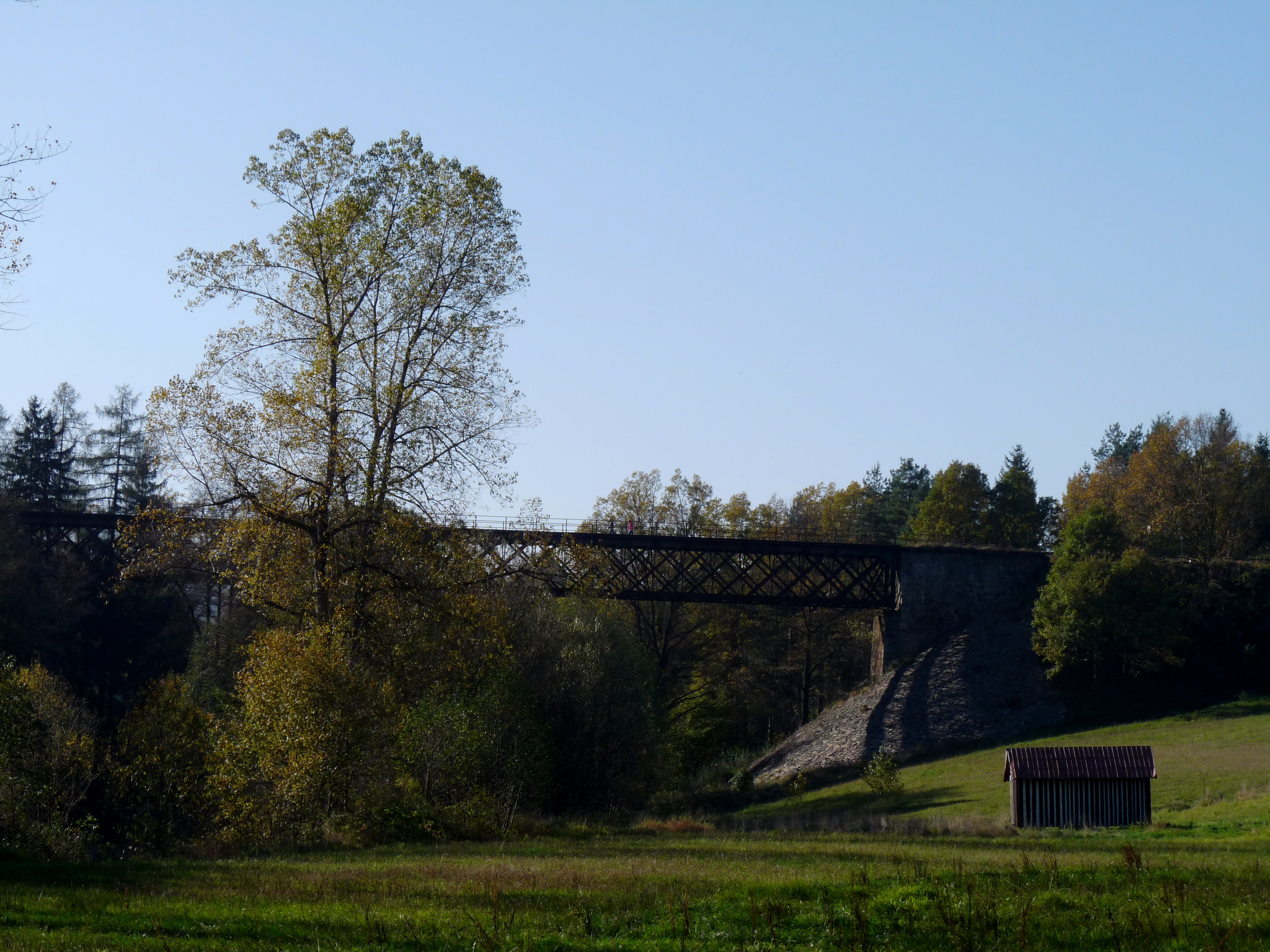
Iron railway bridge

Fragments of the Třísov oppidum have been partly preserved until today.

The iron railway bridge in Holubov is a 100 metres (328 ft) long and 30 metres (98 ft) high viaduct. It is a technical monument. The original construction from 1891 was replaced in 2015.

There is a chair lift which goes from Krasetín to the top of the mountain Kleť, outside the municipal territory. It is 1,792 metres (5,879 ft) long and the difference of altitudes between the lowest and highest point of the lift is 383 metres (1,257 ft).

== Honours ==
The 4277 Holubov and 4287 Třísov minor planets were named after these villages.
