= Libětice =

- Municipality
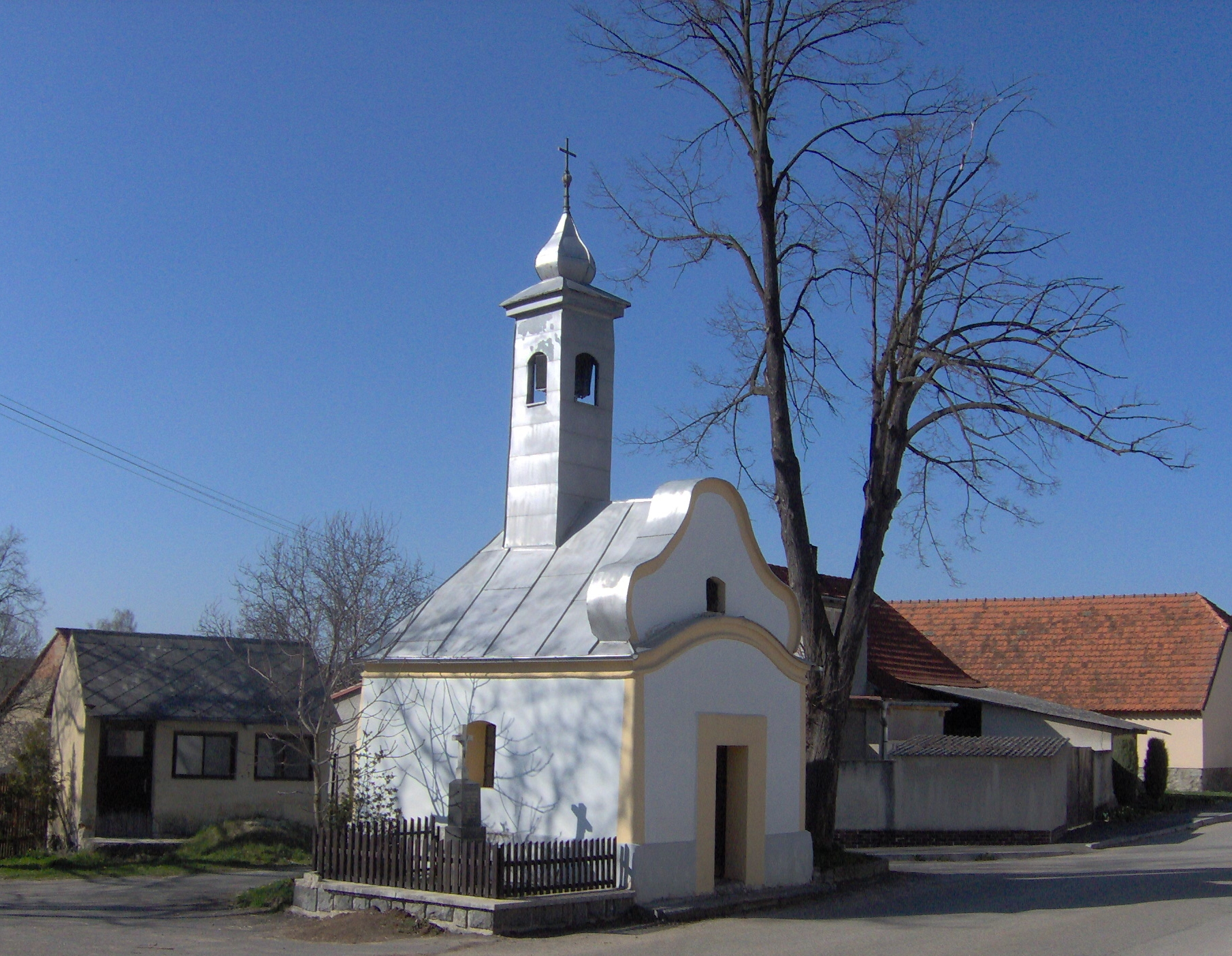
- Chapel

- Location in the Czech Republic
- Coordinates: 49°13′9″N 13°51′46″E
- Country: Czech Republic
- Region: South Bohemian
- District: Strakonice
- First mentioned: 1243

Area
  - Total: 4.51 km^{2} (1.74 sq mi)
- Elevation: 503 m (1,650 ft)

Population (2026-01-01)
  - Total: 87
  - Density: 19/km^{2} (50/sq mi)
- Time zone: UTC+1 (CET)
  - Summer (DST): UTC+2 (CEST)
- Postal code: 386 01
- Website: www.libetice.info

Libětice is a municipality and village in Strakonice District in the South Bohemian Region of the Czech Republic. It has about 90 inhabitants.

== Geography ==
Libětice is located about 5 kilometres (3 mi) southwest of Strakonice and 50 km (31 mi) northwest of České Budějovice. It lies in the Bohemian Forest Foothills. The highest point is the hill Hradiště at 604 m (1,982 ft) above sea level.

== Demographics ==
Historical population
Year	Pop.	±%
1869	211	—
1880	193	−8.5%
1890	185	−4.1%
1900	151	−18.4%
1910	152	+0.7%
1921	155	+2.0%
1930	151	−2.6%
1950	144	−4.6%
1961	140	−2.8%
1970	126	−10.0%
1980	102	−19.0%
1991	95	−6.9%
2001	77	−18.9%
2011	85	+10.4%
2021	85	+0.0%
Source: Censuses
