= Svatá Maří =

- Municipality
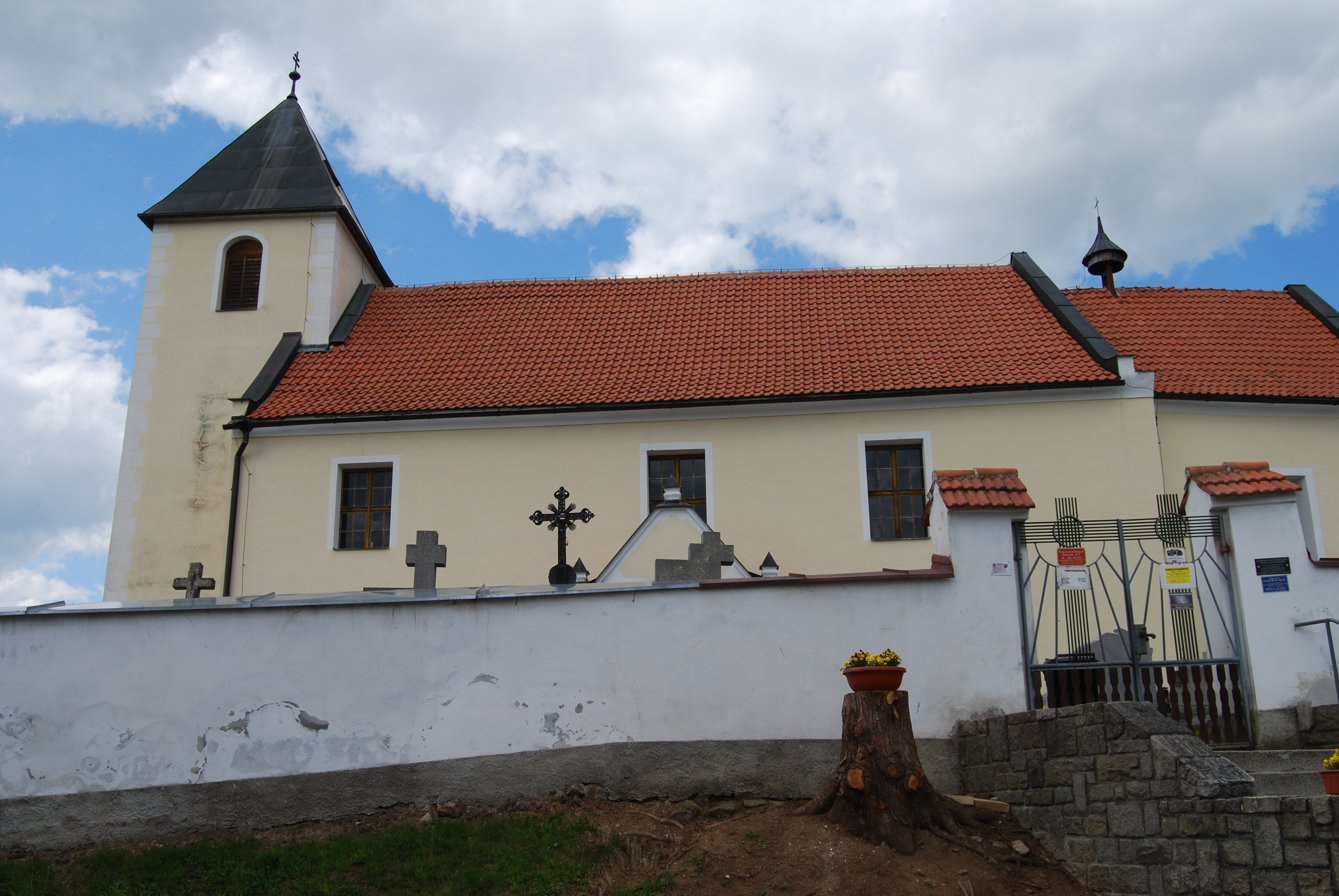
- Church of Saint Mary Magdalene

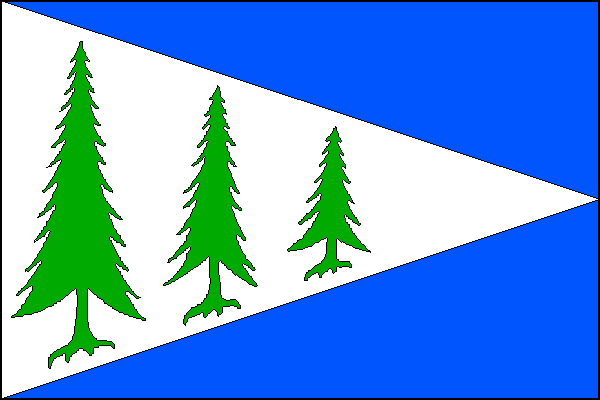
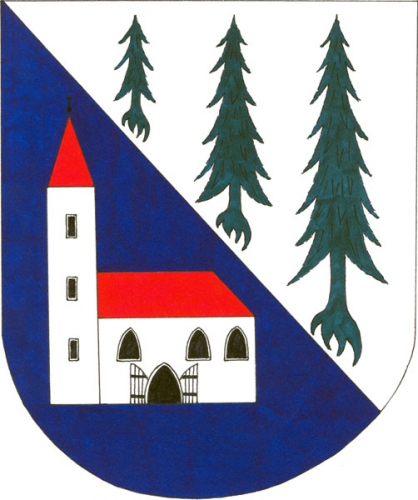
- Flag Coat of arms

- Location in the Czech Republic
- Coordinates: 49°3′53″N 13°49′53″E
- Country: Czech Republic
- Region: South Bohemian
- District: Prachatice
- First mentioned: 1352

Area
  - Total: 12.71 km^{2} (4.91 sq mi)
- Elevation: 765 m (2,510 ft)

Population (2026-01-01)
  - Total: 630
  - Density: 50/km^{2} (130/sq mi)
- Time zone: UTC+1 (CET)
  - Summer (DST): UTC+2 (CEST)
- Postal codes: 383 01, 384 81, 385 01
- Website: www.svatamari.cz

Svatá Maří is a municipality and village in Prachatice District in the South Bohemian Region of the Czech Republic. It has about 600 inhabitants.

== Administrative division ==
Svatá Maří consists of six municipal parts (in brackets population according to the 2021 census):

- Svatá Maří (324)
- Brdo (13)
- Smrčná (36)
- Štítkov (104)
- Trhonín (72)
- Vícemily (44)

== Etymology ==
Svatá Maří was named after the church consecrated to Saint Mary Magdalene (in Czech popularly called svatá Maří Magdaléna).

== Geography ==
Svatá Maří is located about 13 kilometres (8 mi) northwest of Prachatice and 47 km (29 mi) west of České Budějovice. It lies in the Bohemian Forest Foothills, the southern tip of the municipal territory extends into the Bohemian Forest. The highest point is a nameless hill with an altitude of 872 metres (2,861 ft).

== History ==
The first written mention of Svatá Maří is from 1352, when the village was called S. Marie in Laz. The name Svatá Maří was first documented in 1543.

== Demographics ==
Historical population

| Year | Pop. | ±% |
|---|---|---|
| 1869 | 1,041 | — |
| 1880 | 1,058 | +1.6% |
| 1890 | 1,015 | −4.1% |
| 1900 | 1,069 | +5.3% |
| 1910 | 1,108 | +3.6% |

| Year | Pop. | ±% |
|---|---|---|
| 1921 | 1,001 | −9.7% |
| 1930 | 932 | −6.9% |
| 1950 | 644 | −30.9% |
| 1961 | 653 | +1.4% |
| 1970 | 553 | −15.3% |

| Year | Pop. | ±% |
|---|---|---|
| 1980 | 460 | −16.8% |
| 1991 | 448 | −2.6% |
| 2001 | 495 | +10.5% |
| 2011 | 546 | +10.3% |
| 2021 | 593 | +8.6% |

Source: Censuses

== Transport ==
There are no railways or major roads passing through the municipality.

== Sights ==
The main landmark of Svatá Maří is the Church of Saint Mary Magdalene. Originally a Gothic building, it was rebuilt in the Baroque style in the 18th century.
