= Chvalšiny =

- Municipality
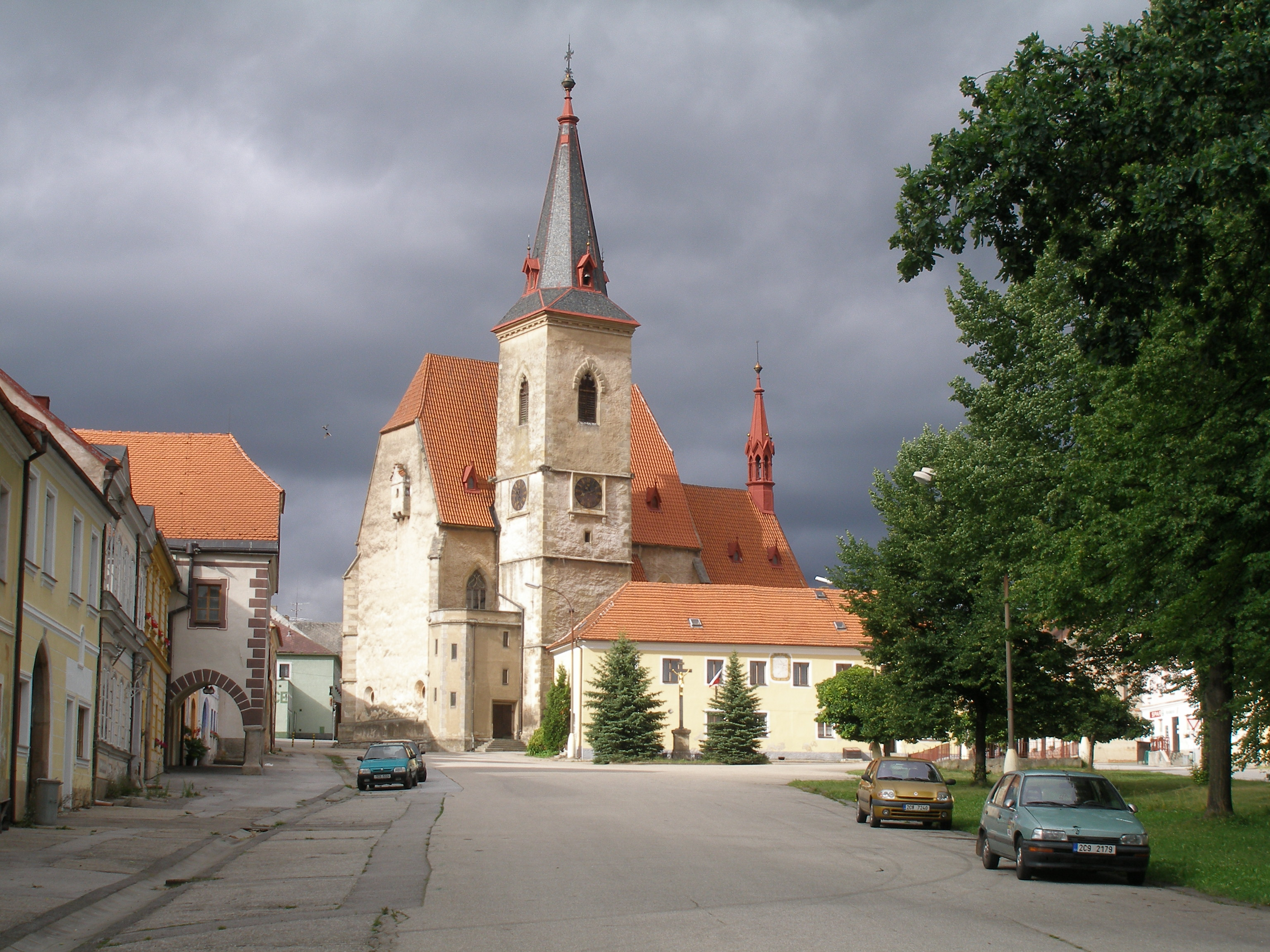
- Church of Saint Mary Magdalene and the square

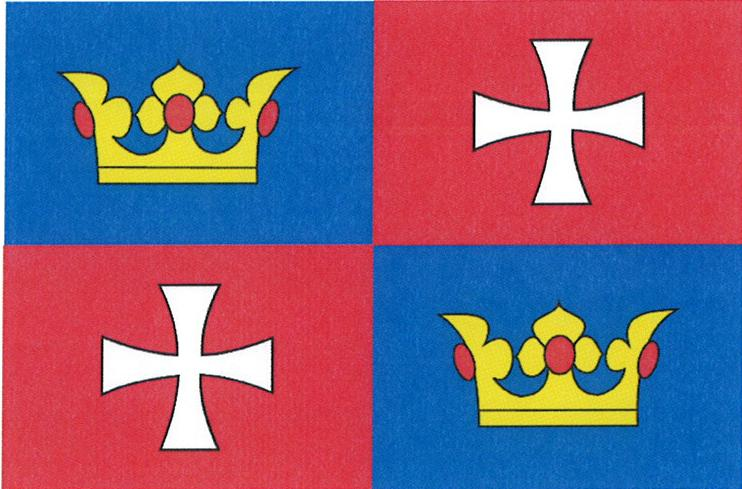
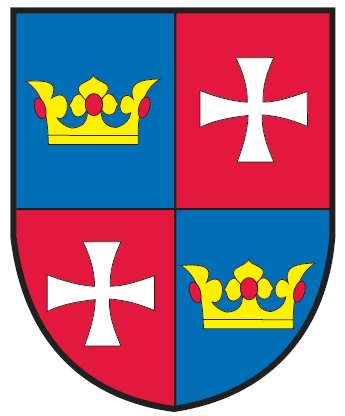
- Flag Coat of arms

- Location in the Czech Republic
- Coordinates: 48°51′15″N 14°12′40″E
- Country: Czech Republic
- Region: South Bohemian
- District: Český Krumlov
- First mentioned: 1281

Area
  - Total: 27.95 km^{2} (10.79 sq mi)
- Elevation: 575 m (1,886 ft)

Population (2026-01-01)
  - Total: 1,211
  - Density: 43.33/km^{2} (112.2/sq mi)
- Time zone: UTC+1 (CET)
  - Summer (DST): UTC+2 (CEST)
- Postal code: 382 08
- Website: www.chvalsiny.cz

Chvalšiny (German: Kalsching) is a municipality and village in Český Krumlov District in the South Bohemian Region of the Czech Republic. It has about 1,200 inhabitants. The historic centre is well preserved and is protected as an urban monument zone.

== Administrative division ==
Chvalšiny consists of four municipal parts (in brackets population according to the 2021 census):

- Chvalšiny (1,024)
- Borová (102)
- Červený Dvůr (90)
- Hejdlov (9)

== Etymology ==
The initial name of Chvalšiny was Chvališín. The name was derived from the personal name Chvališa, meaning "Chvališa's (court)".

== Geography ==
Chvalšiny is located about 9 kilometres (6 mi) northwest of Český Krumlov and 23 km (14 mi) southwest of České Budějovice. Chvalšiny lies in the Bohemian Forest Foothills. The highest point is at 860 m (2,820 ft) above sea level. The stream of Chvalšinský potok flows through the municipality. Most of the municipal territory lies in the Blanský les Protected Landscape Area.

== History ==
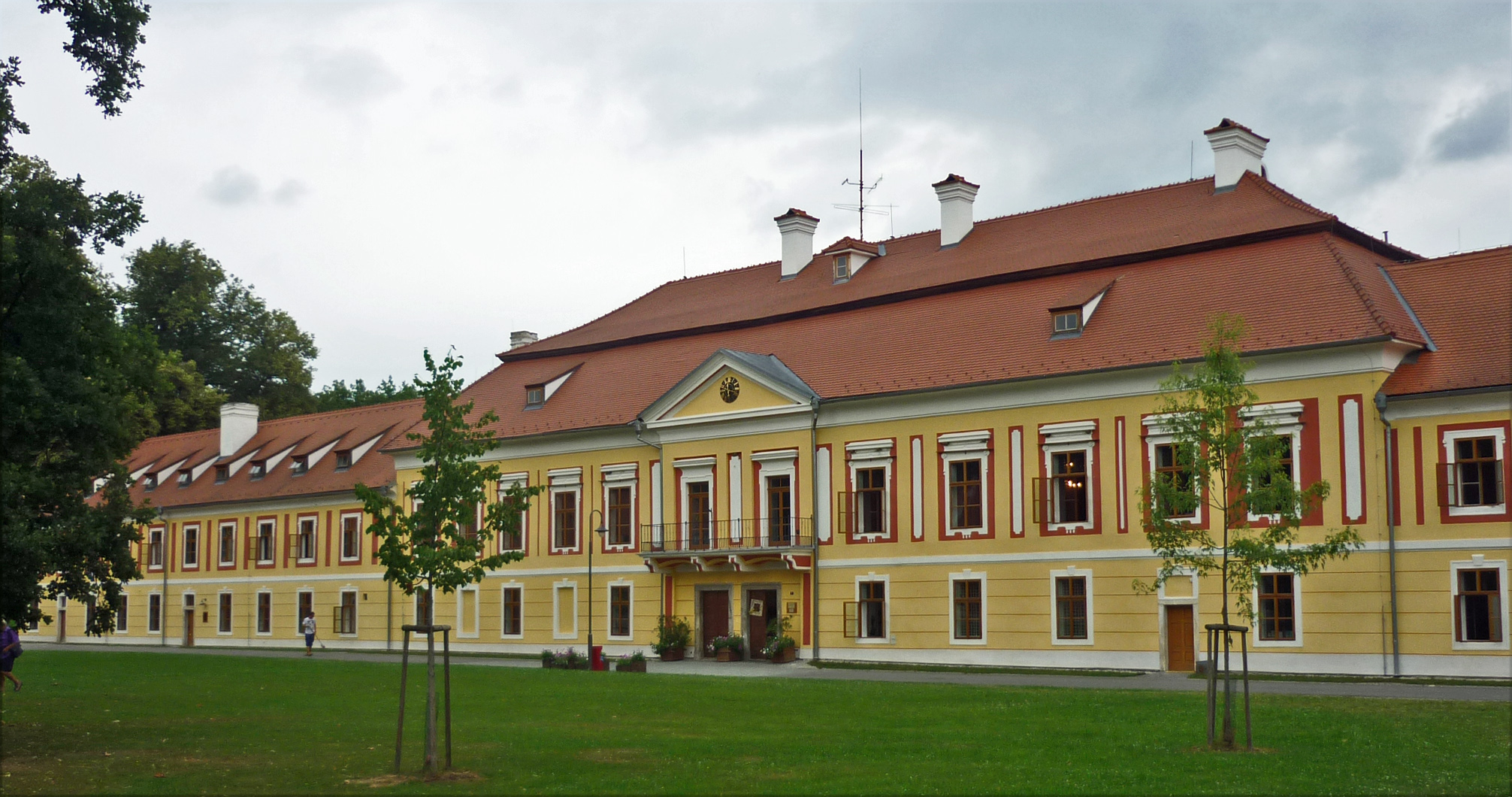
Červený Dvůr Castle

The first written mention of Chvalšiny is from 1281, when it was confirmed as property of Zlatá Koruna Monastery. The settlement rapidly developed and already in 1293, it was referred to as a market town. From 1400 to 1785, the religious administration in Chvalšiny was performed by the monastery. During this period, the German settlers came to the area and slowly formed a majority.

During the Hussite Wars, Oldřich II of Rosenberg acquired most of properties of the monastery, including Chvalšiny. Chvalšiny was owned by the Rosenberg family until 1601, when they sold it to Emperor Rudolf II. From 1622, it was owned by the Eggenberg family, and after their extinction, in 1719 it became property of the House of Schwarzenberg. The Schwarzenbergs held Chvalšiny until the abolition of serfdom in 1848.

In 1938–1945, Chvalšiny was annexed to Nazi Germany. After World War II, the German-speaking population was expelled and the area was resettled by Czech citizens.

== Demographics ==
Historical population

Year	Pop.	±%
1869	1,755	—
1880	1,808	+3.0%
1890	1,749	−3.3%
1900	1,726	−1.3%
1910	1,821	+5.5%

Year	Pop.	±%
1921	1,837	+0.9%
1930	1,885	+2.6%
1950	933	−50.5%
1961	1,053	+12.9%
1970	1,047	−0.6%

Year	Pop.	±%
1980	1,135	+8.4%
1991	1,102	−2.9%
2001	1,111	+0.8%
2011	1,272	+14.5%
2021	1,225	−3.7%

Source: Censuses

== Transport ==
There are no railways or major roads passing through the municipality.

== Sights ==
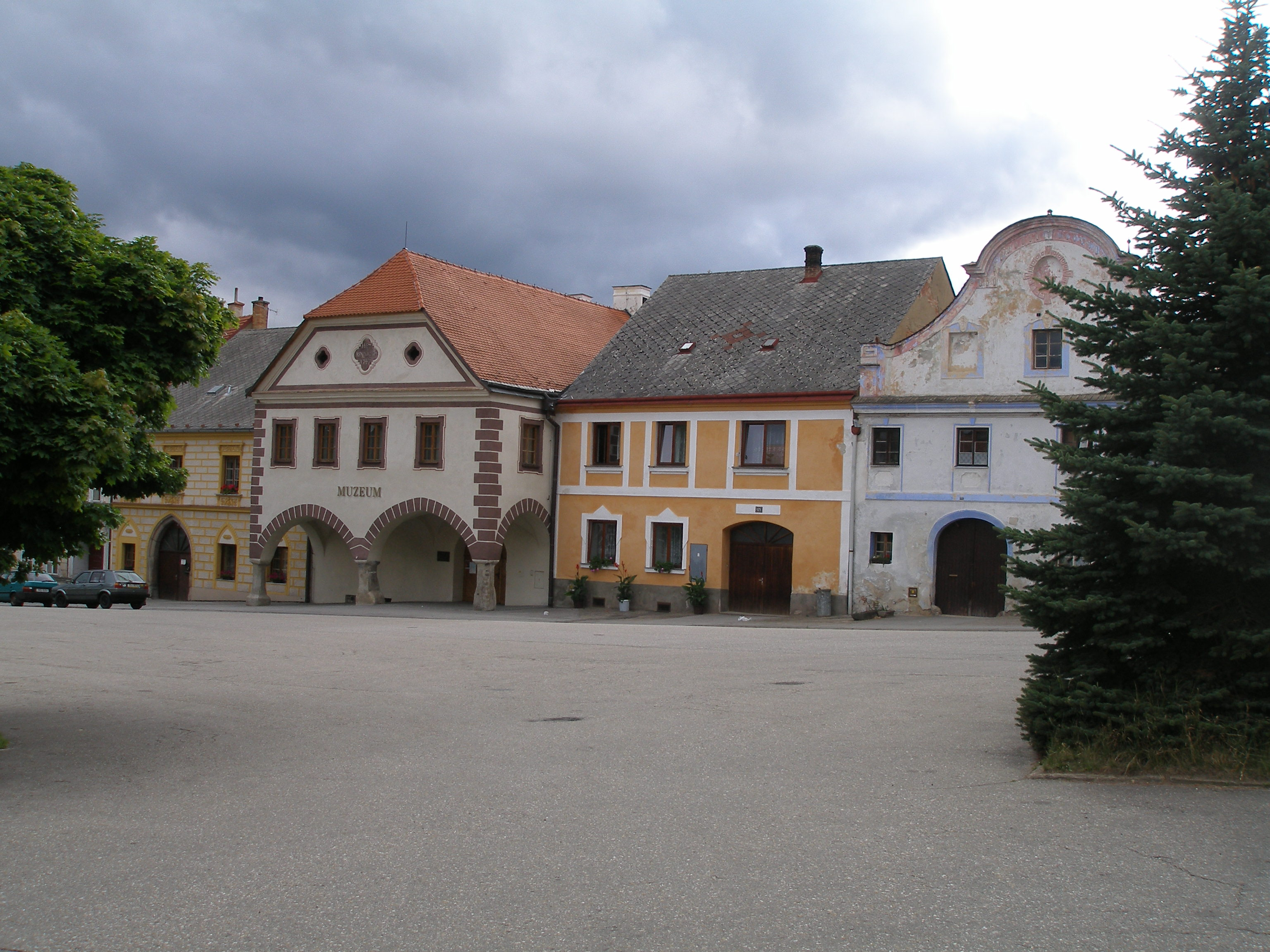
Schwarzenberg Canal Museum on the square

The main landmark of Chvalšiny is the Church of Saint Mary Magdalene. It was built in the late Gothic style in 1487–1507 on the site of an older church.

The former town hall is a Baroque building from 1667. Today it houses the Schwarzenberg Canal Museum, memorialising the canal's architect Josef Rosenauer, who was a native of Chvalšiny.

Červený Dvůr Castle is a Rococo manor house, surrounded by an English park. Today the building houses a psychiatric hospital.
