= Kleť =

Mountain in the Bohemian Forest Foothills, Czech Republic

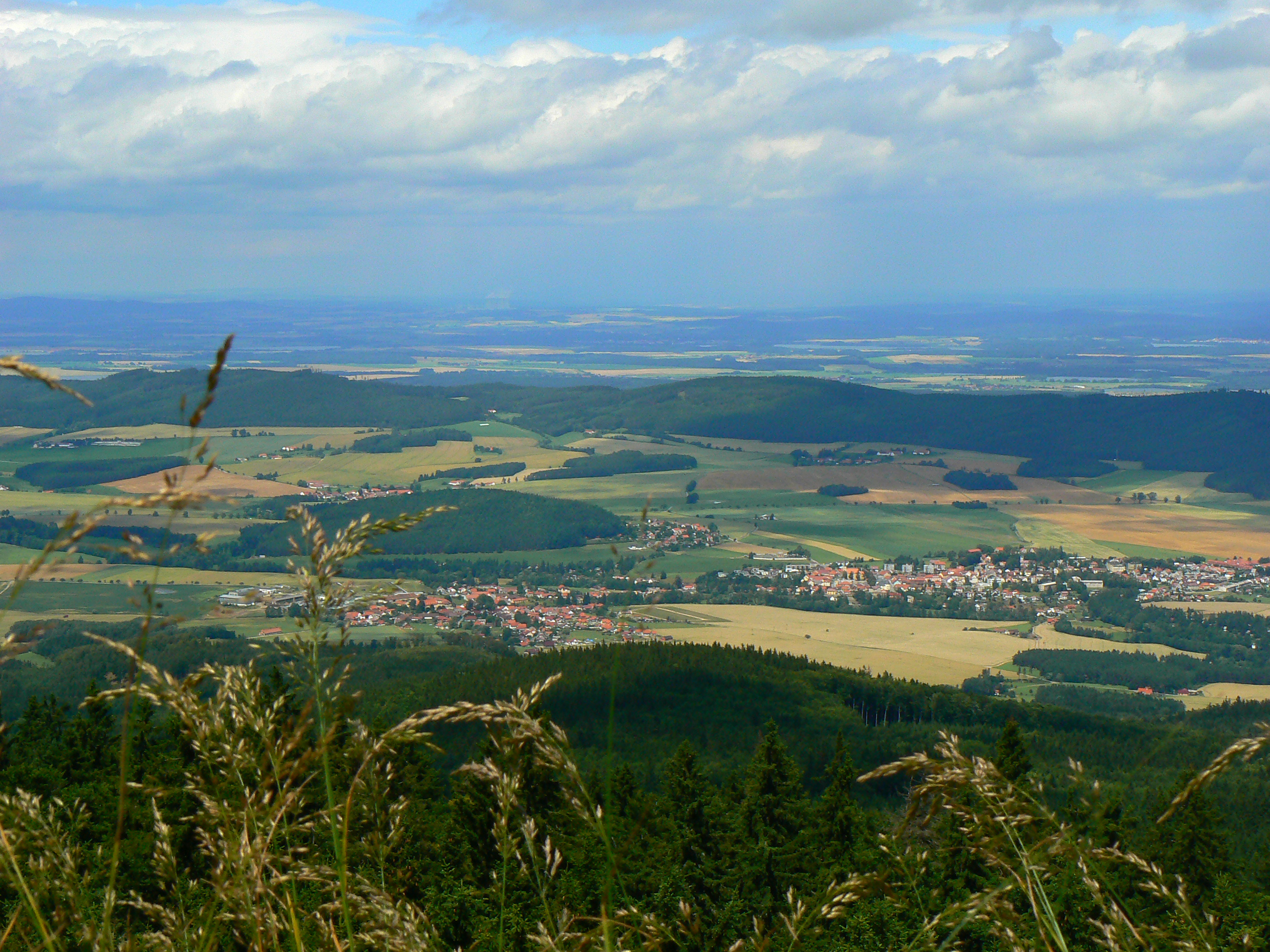
- View from the peak towards the south

Highest point
- Elevation: 1,087 m (3,566 ft)
- Prominence: 432 m (1,417 ft)
- Isolation: 14 km (8.7 mi)
- Coordinates: 48°51′54″N 14°17′2″E

Geography
- Location within Czech Republic
- Location: Křemže, South Bohemian Region, Czech Republic
- Parent range: Bohemian Forest Foothills

Kleť (German: Schöninger) is a mountain in the Bohemian Forest Foothills in the South Bohemian Region of the Czech Republic. It rises 1,087 metres (3,566 ft) above sea level.

== Etymology ==
The name Kleť, also written as Klaď, was first documented in 1263. The origin of the name is unsure. It could be derived from the Old Czech word kleť (meaning 'hut') or from the Old Czech word klaď (meaning 'spike', 'tip'). There is also a romantic theory that the name is derived from the word kletá ('cursed'). The German name Schöninger, Czechized as Šenýgl, was formerly also used for the mountain simultaneously.

== Location ==
Kleť is the second highest mountain in the Bohemian Forest Foothills and the highest mountain of the Blanský les Protected Landscape Area. The peak and northern slopes are situated in the territory of Křemže, while the southern slopes belong to Kájov.

== Geology ==
Kleť is part of the Blanský les massive, which is formed mainly by granulite.

== Buildings ==
Kleť Observatory is located on the southern side of the mountain. It is the highest observatory in the country.

The oldest stone observation tower in the Czech Republic was built on Kleť in 1825. It was built by Count Josef Schwarzenberg and is in the neo-Gothic style. It is 18 m (59 ft) high. It used to be a trigonometric point for cartographic works.

In 1925, a timbered mountain hut called Tereziina chata ("Terezie's hut") was built for tourists. It is a cultural monument. It contains sundial, the highest in the Czech Republic. Inside there is an exhibition about the nature of Blanský les area.

A chairlift from Krasetín with a length of 1,732 m (5,682 ft) and an elevation of 346 m (1,135 ft) was built on Kleť in 1961. Below the peak there is also a television transmitter, which dates from 1977 and is 172 m (564 ft) high.
