= Bohemian Forest Foothills =

Geomorphological region of the Czech Republic

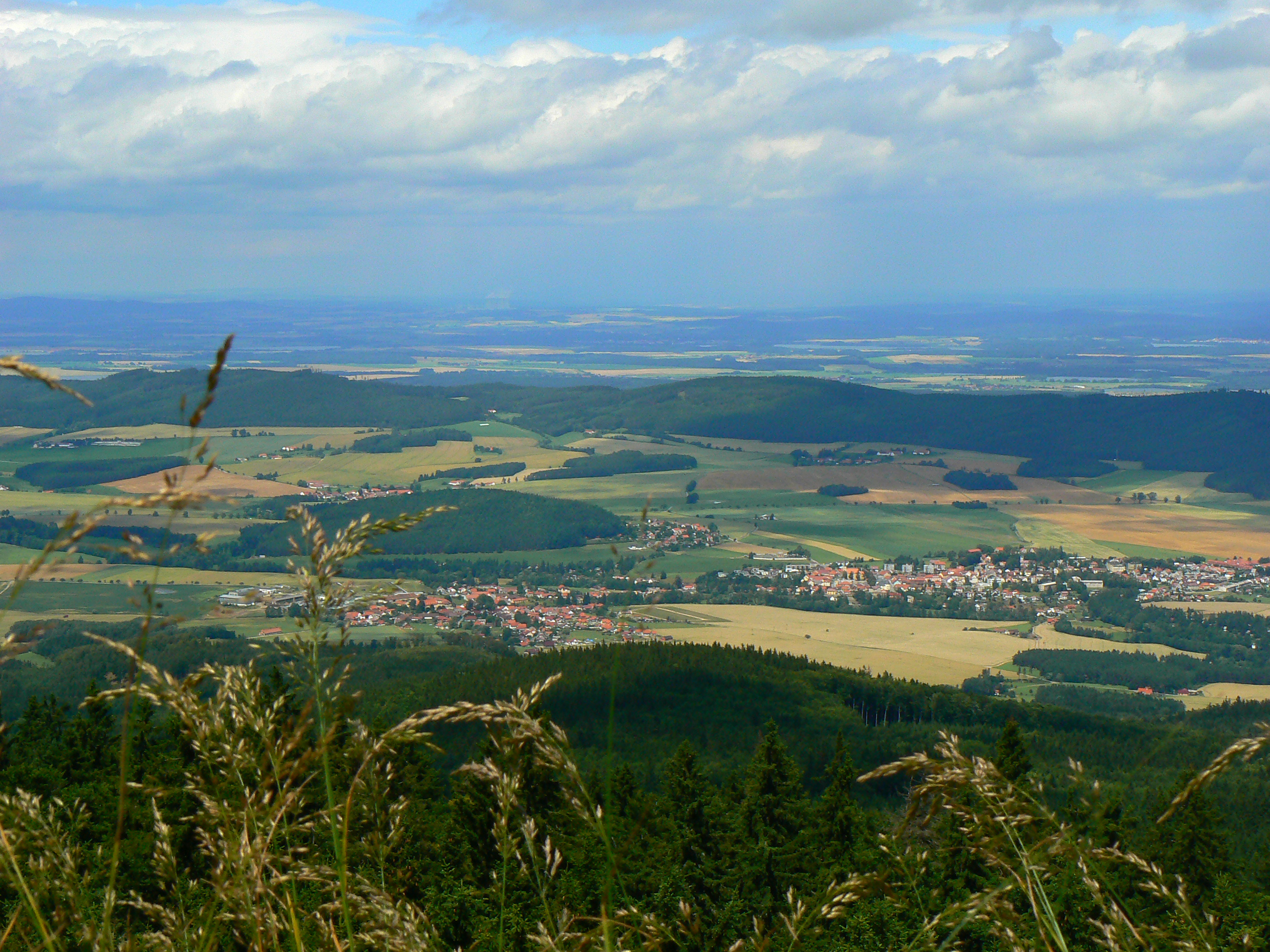
- View from Kleť to the south

Highest point
- Peak: Libín
- Elevation: 1,094 m (3,589 ft)

Dimensions
- Length: 125 km (78 mi)
- Area: 2,407 km^{2} (929 mi^{2})

Geography
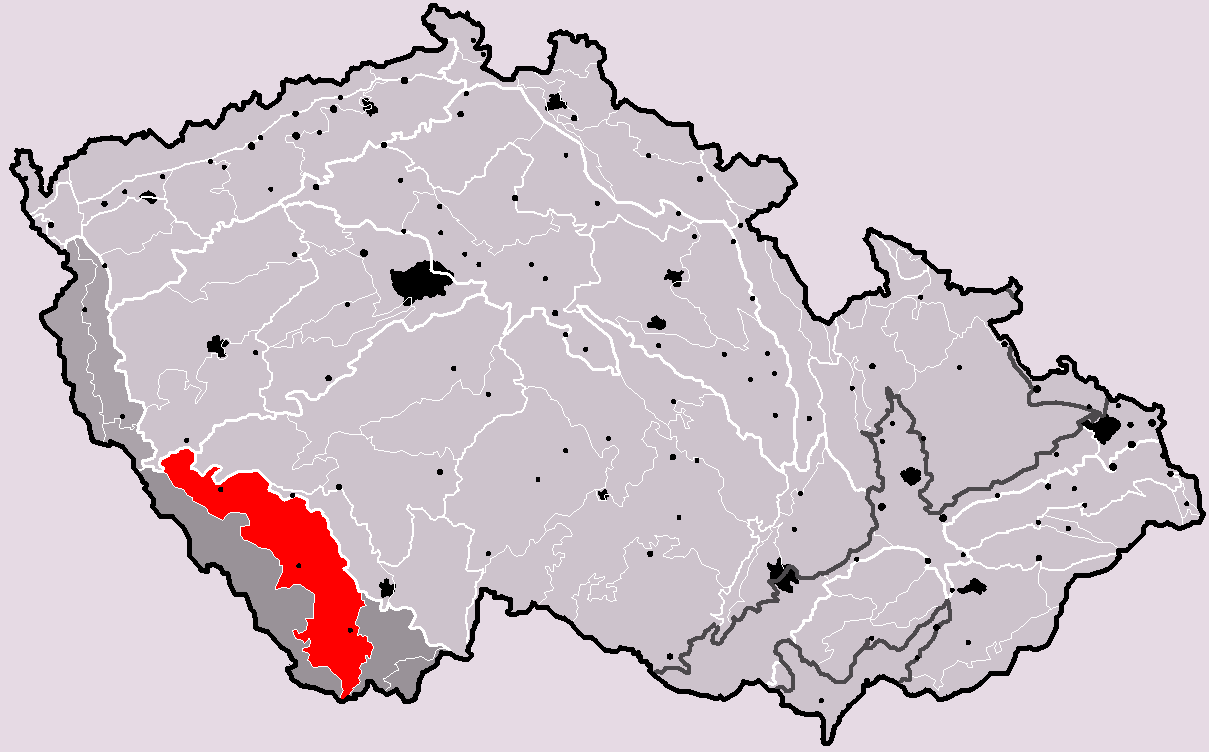
- Bohemian Forest Foothills in the geomorphological system of the Czech Republic
- Country: Czech Republic
- Regions: South Bohemian, Plzeň
- Range coordinates: 49°5′N 13°59′E
- Parent range: Bohemian Forest Highlands

The Bohemian Forest Foothills (Czech: Šumavské podhůří) are foothills of the Bohemian Forest mountain range and a geomorphological mesoregion of the Czech Republic. It is located in the South Bohemian and Plzeň regions.

== Geomorphology ==
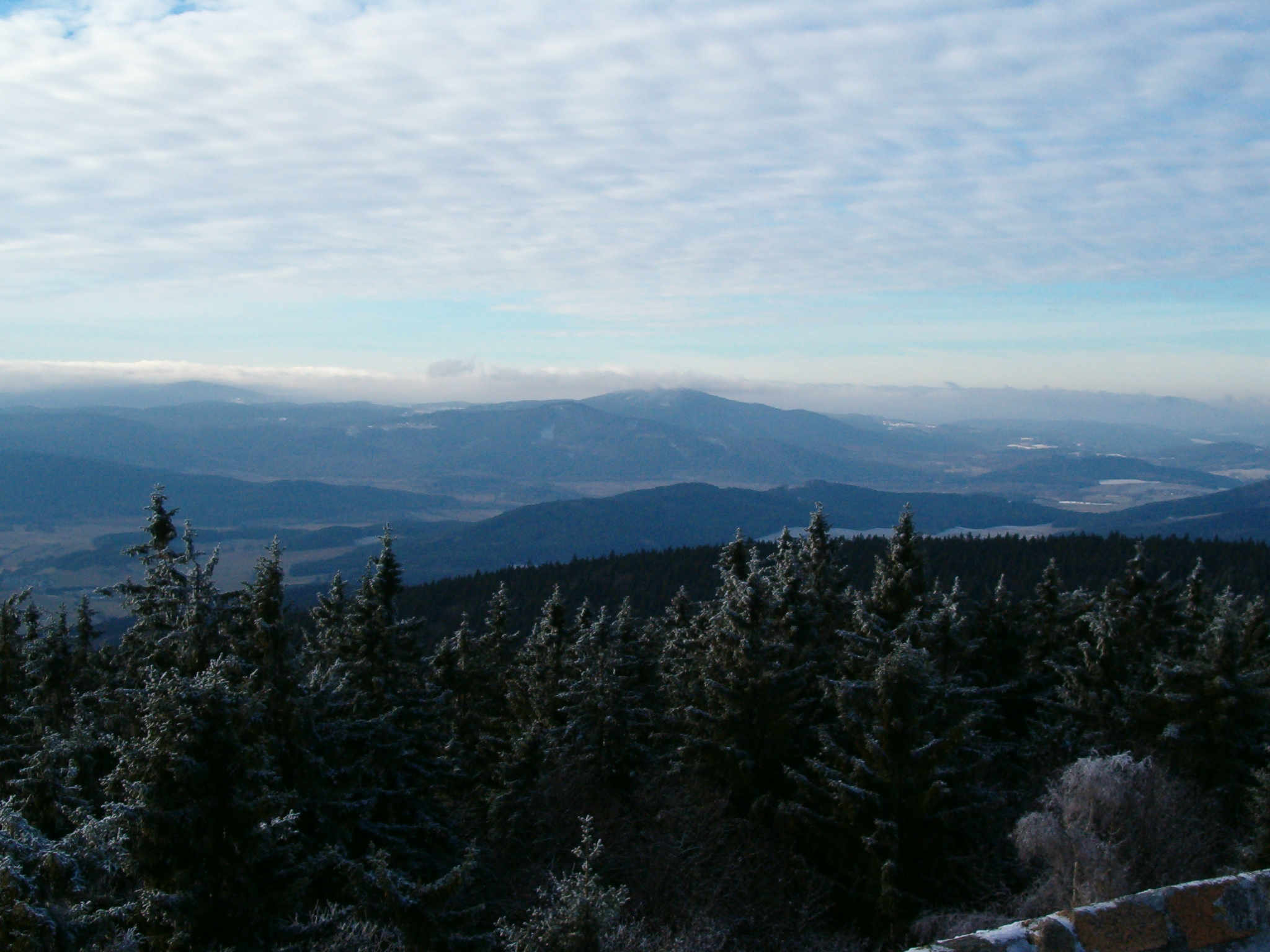
View from Kleť to the northwest, towards Libín

The Bohemian Forest Foothills is a mesoregion of the Bohemian Forest Highlands within the Bohemian Massif. The mesoregion extends along the Bohemian Forest mountains and has a similar relief and geological composition. It differs from the Bohemian Forest in its lower arching and higher degree of denudation. The mesoregion is further subdivided into the microregions of Prachatice Hills, Český Krumlov Highlands, Svatobor Highlands, Vimperk Highlands, Strážov Highlands and Bavorov Highlands.

The highest peaks of the Bohemian Forest Foothills are:

- Libín, 1,094 m (3,589 ft)
- Kleť, 1,087 m (3,566 ft)
- Žebříkový kámen, 1,067 m (3,501 ft)
- Plešný, 1,066 m (3,497 ft)
- Malá Kleť, 1,043 m (3,422 ft)
- Na skalce, 1,032 m (3,386 ft)
- Rohanovský vrch, 1,017 m (3,337 ft)
- Kamenáč, 990 m (3,250 ft)
- Plošina, 972 m (3,189 ft)
- Svinenský vrch, 972 m (3,189 ft)

== Geology ==
The geological bedrock is mainly composed of gneiss, paragneiss, schist and granulite.

== Geography ==
The Bohemian Forest Foothills has an area of 2,407 km^{2} (929 sq mi), making it the fifth largest geomorphological mesoregion in the Czech Republic, and an average elevation of 634 m (2,080 ft). The territory has an elongated shape from the northwest to the southeast, which is about 125 km (78 mi) long and about 20 km (12 mi) wide.

The area is densely interwoven with many watercourses. The Bohemian Forest Foothills is drained by the rivers Otava (north), Volyňka (north-centre), Blanice (south-centre) and Vltava (south). A small part of the Lipno Reservoir extends into the territory, but there are no other significant bodies of water.

The most populated towns in the territory are Český Krumlov, Prachatice, Sušice, Větřní and Volyně. The northern half of Vimperk and the southern part of Strakonice also extend into the Bohemian Forest Foothills.

== Nature ==
In the western part of the Bohemian Forest Foothills is Blanský les, protected as a protected landscape area and as a special area of conservation. It has an area of 220 km^{2} (85 sq mi).

== Gallery ==
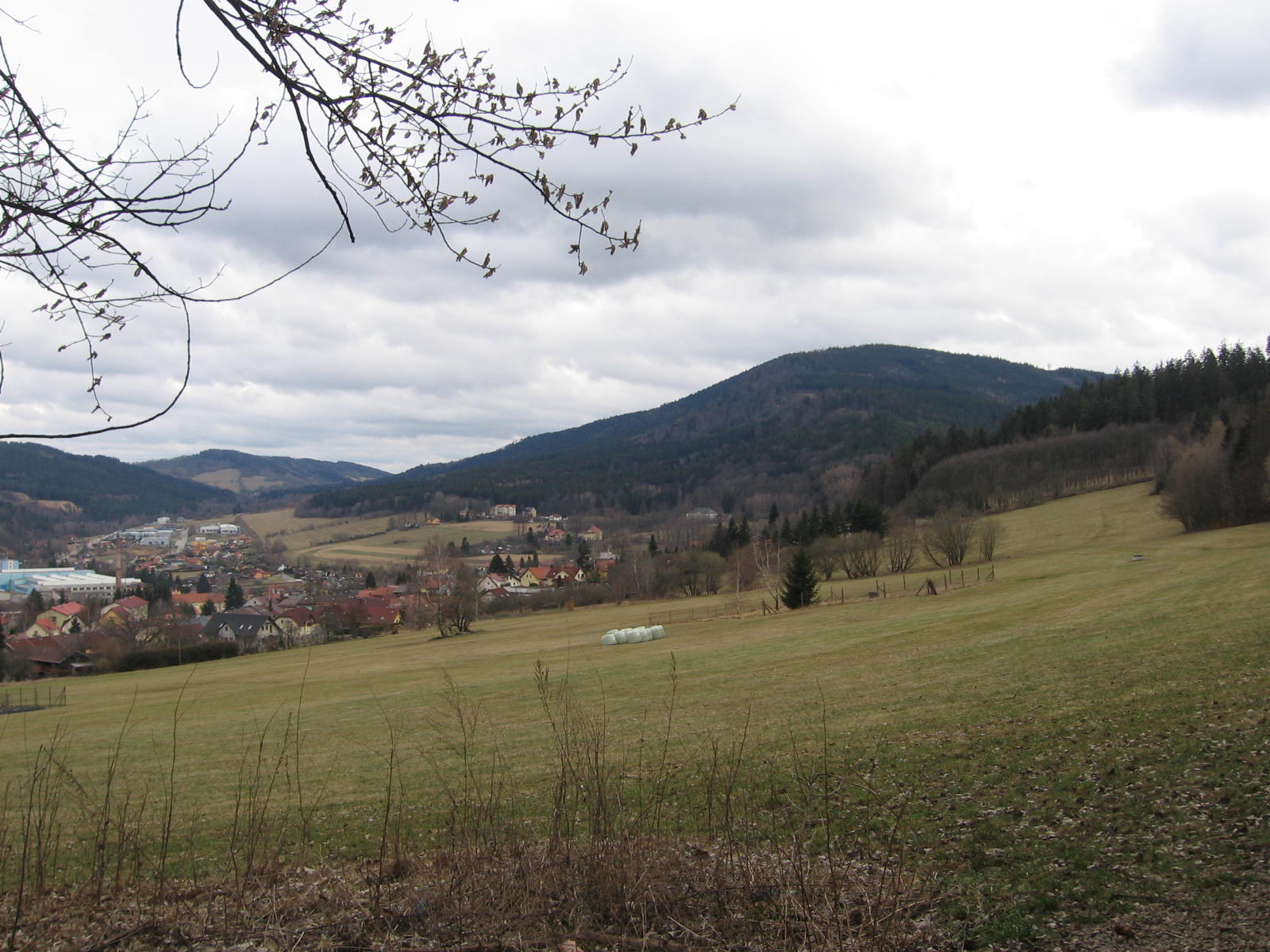
Libín, the highest mountain

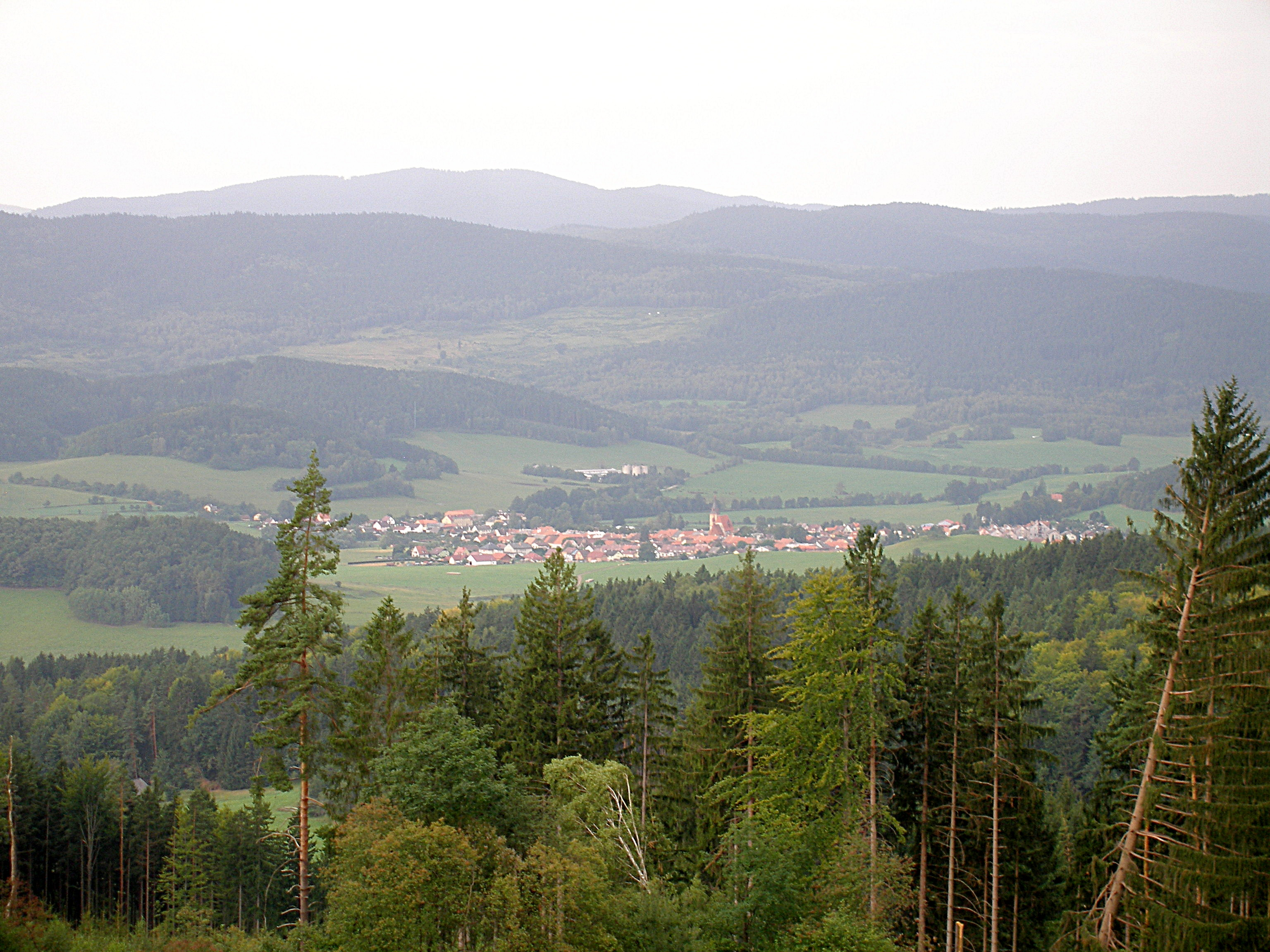
View of Chvalšiny

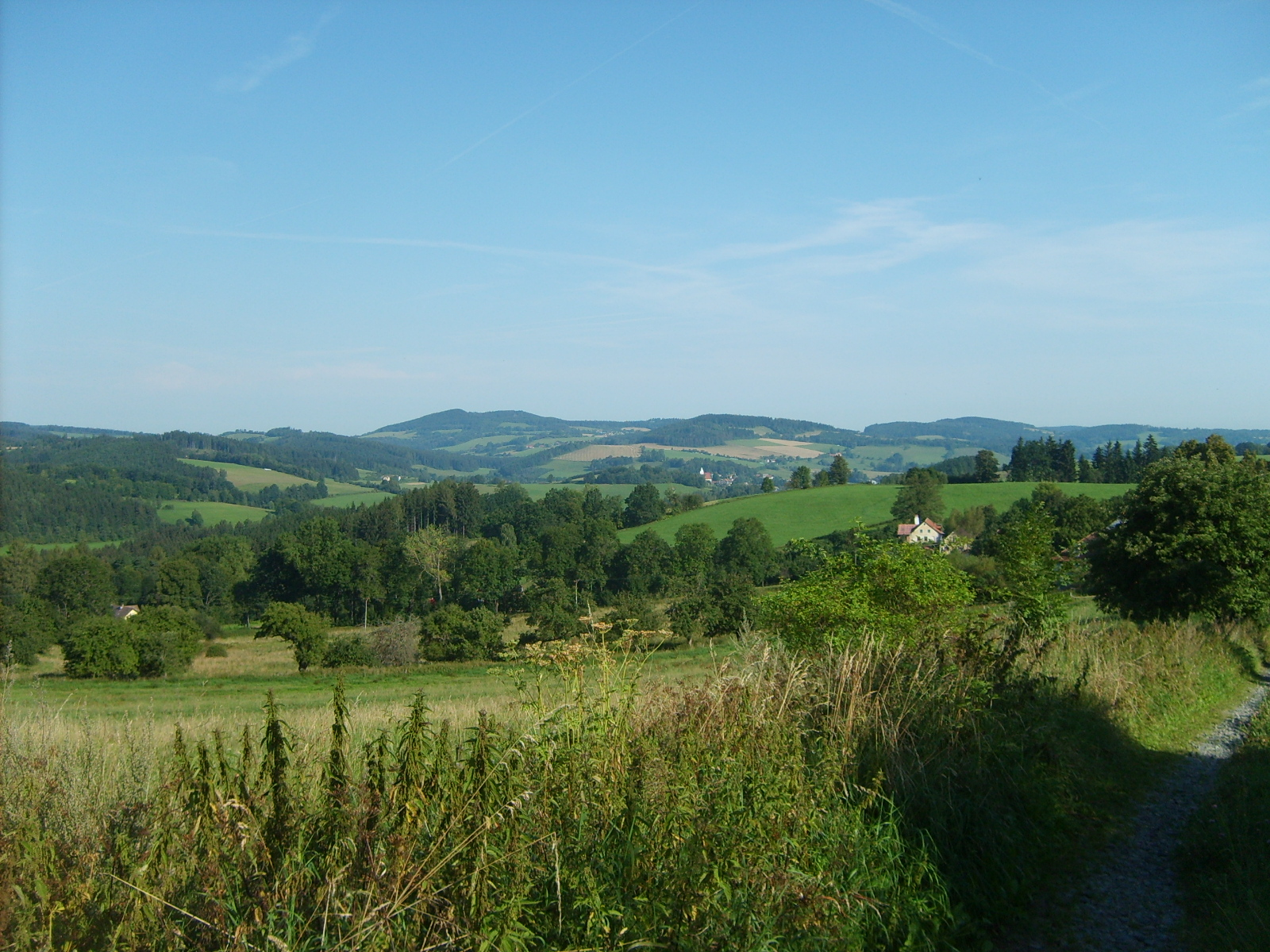
Landscape between Sušice and Hartmanice

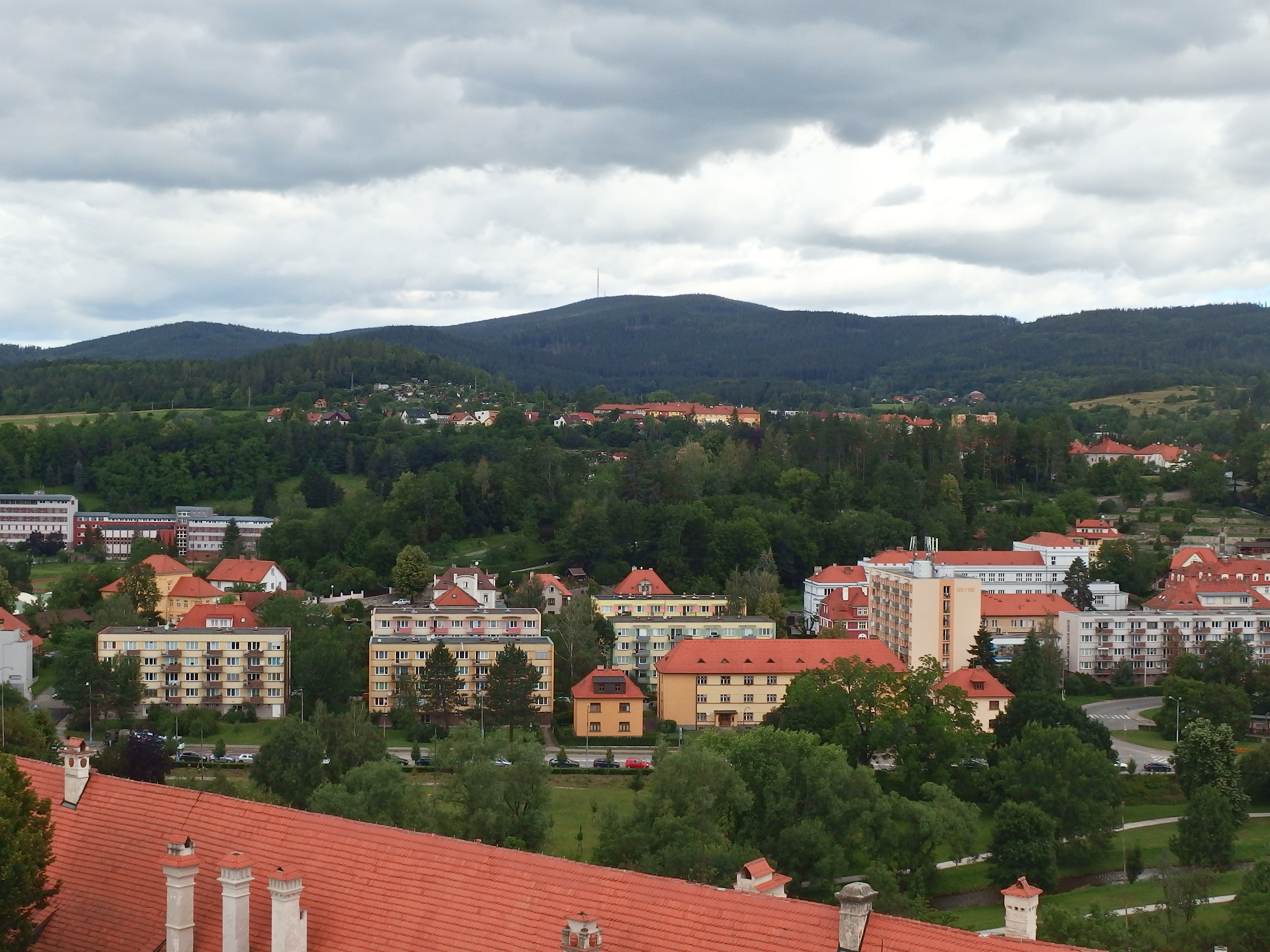
View of Kleť from Český Krumlov

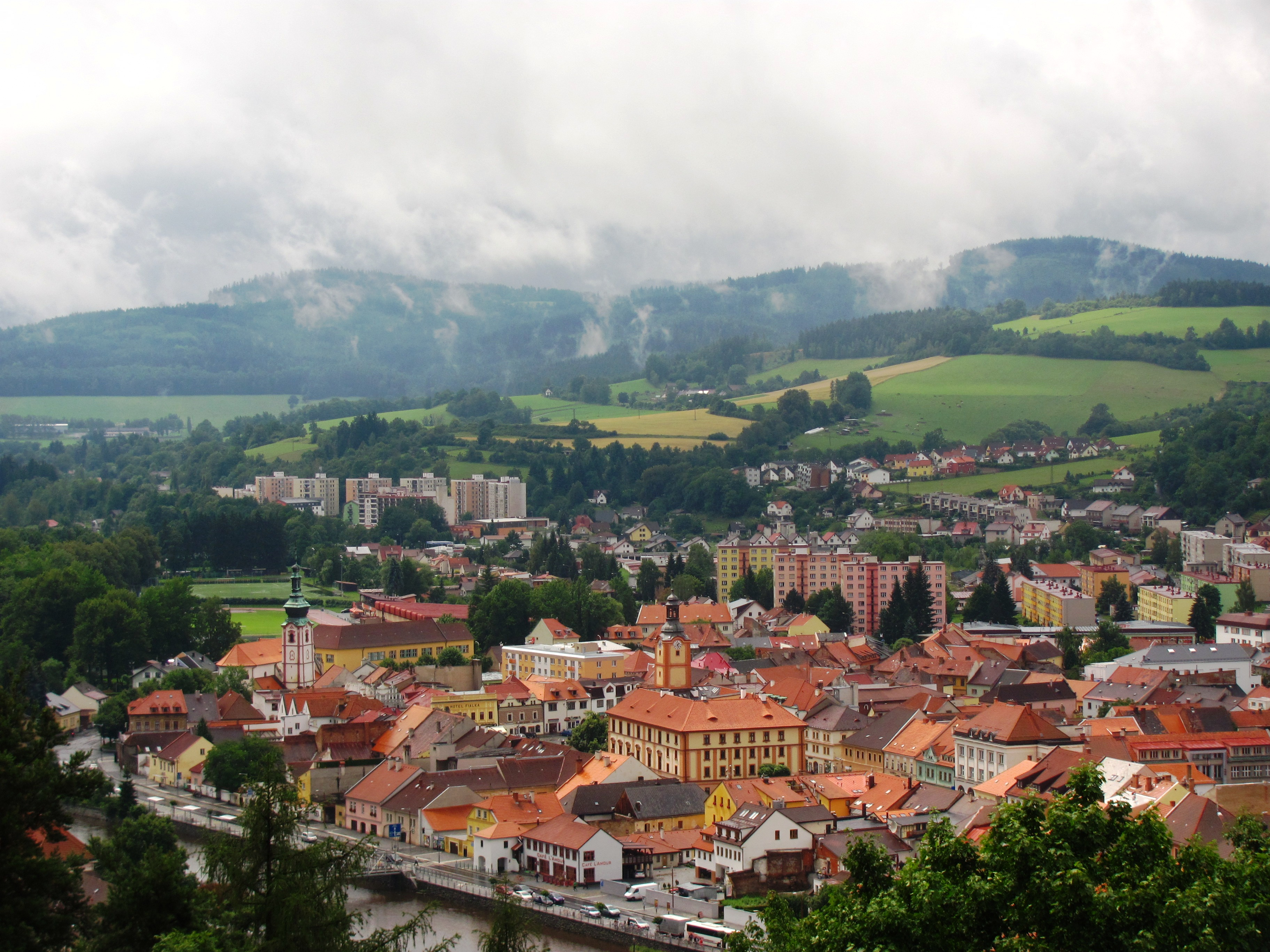
View of Sušice
