= Battle of Austerlitz =

1805 battle of the War of the Third Coalition

- Part of the War of the Third Coalition
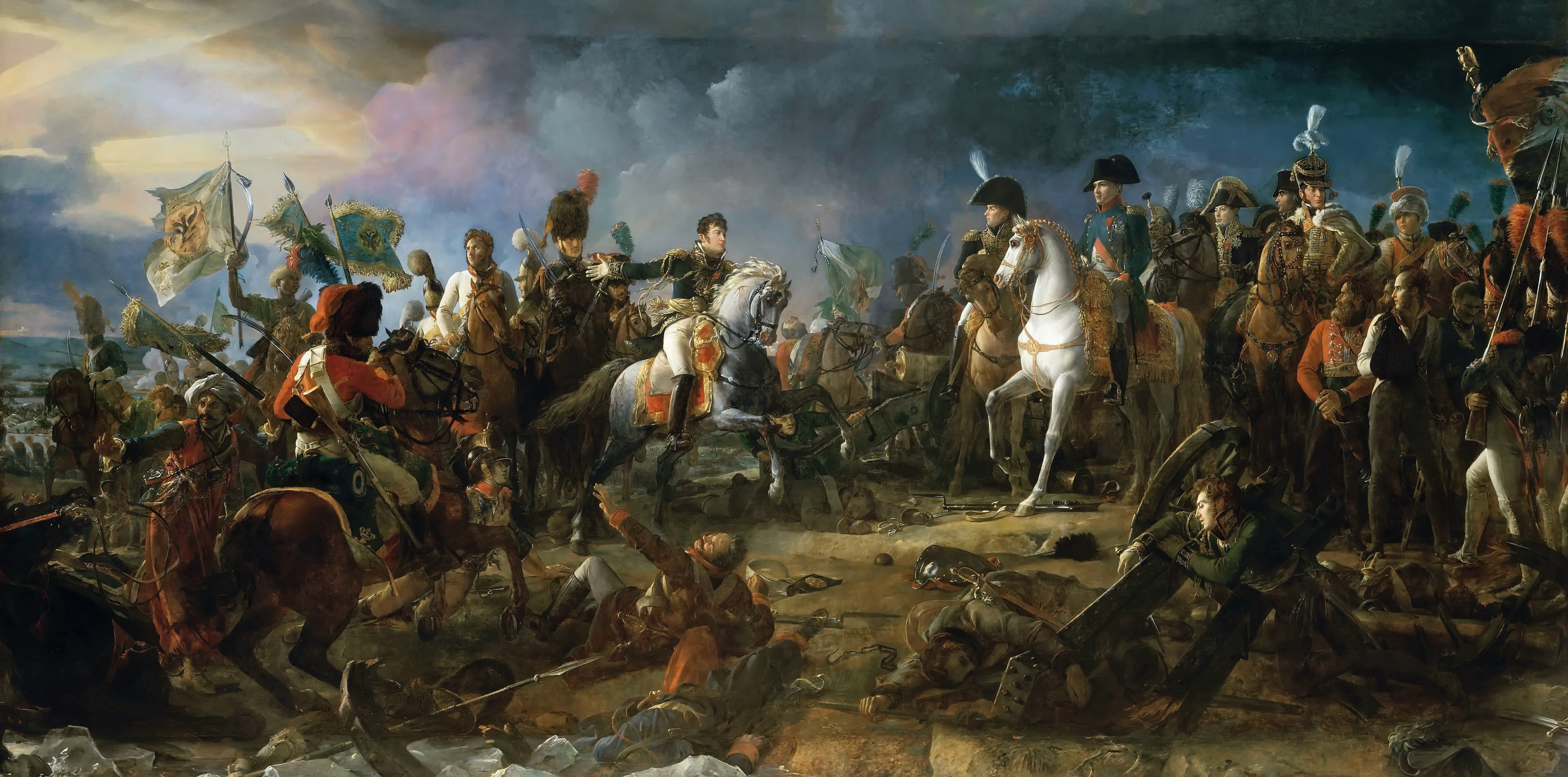
- Battle of Austerlitz, 2 December 1805 (c. 1810)
Date	2 December 1805
Location	Austerlitz, Moravia, Austrian Empire (today Slavkov u Brna, Czech Republic) 49°7′41″N 16°45′45″E
Result	French victory
Territorial changes	Dissolution of the Holy Roman Empire and creation of the Confederation of the Rhine

Belligerents
French Empire: Kingdom of Italy	Russian Empire; Austrian Empire

Commanders and leaders
Napoleon I; Jean-Baptiste Bessières; Jean-Baptiste Bernadotte; Louis-Nicolas Davout; Jean-de-Dieu Soult; Jean Lannes; Géraud Duroc; Joachim Murat; Louis-Vincent-Joseph Le Blond de Saint-Hilaire; Nicolas Oudinot; Claude Juste Alexandre Legrand; Dominique Vandamme	Alexander I; Mikhail Kutuzov (Note: Nominal overall commander of the Russo-Austrian army. Substantially, he held control only over the 4th Column.); Pyotr Bagration; Konstantin Pavlovich; Friedrich Wilhelm von Buxhoeveden; Mikhail Miloradovich; Dmitry Dokhturov; Louis de Langeron; Ignaty Przybyszewski; Francis I; Franz von Weyrother (Note: Chief of staff. His plan of attack was chosen by Alexander I.); Michael von Kienmayer; Johann Kollowrat; Johann I Joseph

Units involved
Imperial Guard; I Corps; III Corps; IV Corps; V Corps; Grenadier Division; Reserve Cavalry Corps; Royal Guard	Imperial Guard; Advance Guard of the Tsar; Advance Guard of General von Buxhoeveden; First Column; Second Column; Third Column; Fourth Column; Fifth Cavalry Column

Strength
65,000–75,000 (Note: French numbers at the battle vary depending on the account; 65,000–75,000 are figures often present in the literature. The discrepancy arises because about 7,000 men of Davout's III Corps were not at the battle right when it started. Including or not including these troops is a matter of preference (in this article, they will be included as separate from the 67,000 French soldiers originally on the field). David G. Chandler (1966) gives 67,000 (without Davout's III Corps).)	73,000–89,000 (Note: Allied numbers at the battle vary depending on the account; 73,000, 84,000, or 89,000 are figures often present in the literature. Andrew Uffindell (2003) claims 73,000, while David G. Chandler claims 85,000. Scott Bowden (1997) writes that the traditional number given for the Allies, 85,000, reflects their theoretical strength, not the true numbers on the battlefield.)

Casualties and losses
Total: 8,569–9,288 (Note: In all probability, the latter figure is very close to reality, which can range up to 9,000 or 9,500. "As always and everywhere, however, even the most accurate reports give only an order of magnitude." French researchers Danielle and Bernard Quintin recently conducted massive work that identified 1,537 Frenchmen dead, including those who died from wounds. In addition, the fate of the 400 French troops of Austerlitz is unknown. Alexander Mikhailovsky-Danilevsky (1844) says that the French lost up to 8,000 dead or wounded and 760 missing. He also cites an unverified claim by Marshal Bernadotte, France's future rival, that the French lost "up to" 12,000 men. Based on incomplete French data, Modest Bogdanovich (1869) cites the figure of 8,644 casualties among the French, trying to exalt it by claiming an identical one to Bernadotte's. Andrew Roberts (2014) estimates total losses at 8,279; these are only the dead and wounded.); 1,288–1,537 dead; 6,708–6,991 wounded (Note: Sokolov (2019) cites modern French research showing 1,537 killed in Napoleon's army, including died of wounds. From this figure, subtract the older estimate of 1,305 killed cited by Sokolov (from reports given to Napoleon, as per Sokolov), yielding 232. The older figure for wounded cited by Sokolov is 6,940 (from reports given to Napoleon, as per Sokolov), and 6,940 – 232 is 6,708.); 573–760 captured or missing	Total: 27,000–36,000 (Note: Alexander Mikhailovsky-Danilevsky's book has a statement that the 21,000 Russian casualties are incomplete, as it excludes those who "dispersed," or, in other words, went missing in action.); 15,000–16,000 killed or wounded; 12,000–20,000 captured; ~21,000 or ≥28,000; ≥6,000 (Note: Russian and Austrian authorities put the Austrian loss, including casualties and "other losses" (as per Bodart), at 6,000 men.); Material losses; 186 cannon; 400 ammunition wagons; 45 standards
- Location within Europe

War of the Third Coalition:
Austria
current battle
Napoleon in command
Napoleon not in command

The Battle of Austerlitz was fought on Monday 2 December 1805, near Austerlitz (then in the Austrian Empire, now in the Czech Republic), being the decisive engagement of the War of the Third Coalition. The Grande Armée under the command of Emperor Napoleon I defeated a combined Russo-Austrian army. One force was an imperial Russian army under the command of Tsar Alexander I and General Mikhail Kutuzov, while the other comprised an imperial Austrian army under the command of Emperor Francis II. The battle was known contemporaneously as the Battle of the Three Emperors (after the three monarchs present on the field).

The battle is often cited by military historians as one of Napoleon's tactical masterpieces, in the same league as other historic engagements like Hannibal's Cannae (216 BC) or Alexander the Great's Gaugamela (331 BC). (Note: Farwell (2001) writes "Austerlitz is generally regarded as one of Napoleon's tactical masterpieces and has been ranked as the equal of Arbela, Cannae, and Leuthen.") (Note: Dupuy (1990) was not afraid of expressing an opinion, and he classified some of his subjects as Great Captains, such as Napoleon.) The military victory of Napoleon's Grande Armée at Austerlitz brought the War of the Third Coalition to an end, with the Peace of Pressburg signed by the French and Austrians later in the month. These achievements did not establish a lasting peace on the continent. Austerlitz had driven neither Russia nor Britain, whose armies protected Sicily from a French invasion, to settle.

After eliminating an Austrian army during the Ulm campaign, French forces seized Vienna in November 1805. The Austrians avoided further conflict until the arrival of the Russians, who helped increase the allied numbers. Napoleon sent his army north in pursuit of the Allies, but then ordered his forces to retreat so he could feign a grave weakness to lure the Allies into thinking that they were facing a weak army, while it was in fact formidable. Napoleon gave every indication in the days preceding the engagement that the French army was in a pitiful state, even abandoning the dominant Pratzen Heights near Austerlitz. He deployed the French army below the Pratzen Heights and weakened his right flank, enticing the Allies to launch an assault there to roll up the French line. The French Emperor meanwhile hid the main army in dead ground (ground obscured from a particular vantage point). Napoleon's plan was based on the hope that Marshal Davout and his III Corps would arrive soon on their way from Vienna. A forced march by Davout plugged the gap left by Napoleon just in time. Davout's men stubbornly held their defensive positions under the onslaught of superior opponents. These positions represented both a natural and a fortified-structural barrier. The Allied deployment against the French right weakened the Allied centre on the Pratzen Heights, which was attacked by the IV Corps of Marshal Soult. Napoleon also exploited the weather: noticing the weakened Allied centre, he sent this corps just as the early morning mist – which contributed to the concealment of both Soult's corps and the Allied centre – was clearing. The mist at that moment had not cleared low enough to uncover Soult's advance. With the centre demolished, the French swept through both flanks and routed the Allies, which enabled the French to capture thousands of prisoners.

Remarkably, the pleiad of Russian military commanders nurtured by the great general Alexander Suvorov (1730–1800) – including Mikhail Kutuzov, Pyotr Bagration, Mikhail Miloradovich, Nikolay Kamensky, Sergei Kamensky, Peter Wittgenstein and Friedrich (Fyodor) von Buxhoeveden – was decisively defeated at Austerlitz. (Note: Kutuzov commanded a column in Suvorov's assault on Izmail. Bagration took one of the leading roles in Suvorov's Italian and Swiss expedition of 1799, as did Miloradovich and N. Kamensky. Officers Wittgenstein and S. Kamensky took part in the assault on Praga, in which Buxhoeveden commanded one of the columns. At Austerlitz, Bagration commanded the right allied flank, Kutuzov (actually) commanded the central section, Buxhoeveden led the left allied flank, Miloradovich commanded the column, while N. Kamensky, S. Kamensky, and Wittgenstein led the brigades (see Battle of Austerlitz order of battle).) The blame for the Allied disaster initially lies with the supreme commander Emperor Alexander I of Russia, who, together with his Austrian chief of staff Franz von Weyrother, fell into Napoleon's "trap" at Austerlitz by accepting an encounter on a battlefield chosen by the French Emperor, then being encircled in the direction of the left Allied flank. (Note: Battle of Austerlitz order of battle § Army of the Third Coalition) The Allied disaster significantly shook the will of Emperor Francis to further resist Napoleon. France and Austria agreed to an armistice immediately, and the Treaty of Pressburg followed shortly after, on 26 December. Pressburg took Austria out of both the war and the Coalition while reinforcing the earlier treaties of Campo Formio and of Lunéville between the two powers. The treaty confirmed the Austrian loss of lands in Italy and Bavaria to France, and in Germany to Napoleon's German allies. It also imposed an indemnity of 40 million francs, equivalent to €106 million in 2025, on the Habsburgs and allowed the fleeing Russian troops free passage through hostile territories and back to their home soil. Critically, victory at Austerlitz permitted the creation of the Confederation of the Rhine, a collection of German states intended as a buffer zone between France and the eastern powers, Austria, Prussia, and Russia. The Confederation rendered the Holy Roman Empire virtually useless, so Francis dissolved the Holy Roman Empire in 1806, but remained as emperor of Austria. Prussian worries about the growing French influence in Central Europe led to the War of the Fourth Coalition in 1806.

== Background ==
Europe had been in turmoil since the start of the French Revolutionary Wars in 1792. In 1797, after five years of war, the French Republic broke up the First Coalition, an alliance of Austria, Prussia, Great Britain, Spain, and various Italian states. A Second Coalition, led by Britain, Austria and Russia, and including the Ottoman Empire, Portugal and the Kingdom of Naples, was formed in 1798, but by 1801, this too had been defeated, leaving the British the only opponent of the new French Consulate. In March 1802, France and Britain agreed to end hostilities under the Treaty of Amiens.

However, many problems persisted between the two sides, and implementing the treaty became increasingly difficult. The British government resented having to return captured colonies to France and the Batavian Republic under the terms of the Treaty of Amiens. Napoleon was angry that the British refused to abandon the island of Malta. The tense situation only worsened when Napoleon sent an expeditionary force to restore French authority in the colony of Saint-Domingue. In May 1803, Britain declared war on France.

=== Third Coalition ===
In December 1804, an Anglo-Swedish agreement led to the creation of the Third Coalition. British Prime Minister William Pitt the Younger spent 1804 and 1805 in a flurry of diplomatic activity geared towards forming a new coalition against France, and by April 1805, Britain and Russia had signed an alliance. (Note: The Baltic Sea was dominated by Russia, something Britain was not comfortable with, as it provided valuable commodities like timber, tar, and hemp which were crucial supplies to the British. Additionally, Britain supported the Ottoman Empire against Russian incursions towards the Mediterranean Sea. Meanwhile, French territorial rearrangements in Germany occurred without Russian consultation, and Napoleon's annexations in the Po valley increasingly strained relations between the two.) Having been defeated twice in recent memory by France and being keen on revenge, Austria joined the Coalition a few months later.

== Forces ==
=== French Imperial army ===
Before the formation of the Third Coalition, Napoleon had assembled an invasion force called the Armée d'Angleterre (Army of England) around six camps at Boulogne in Northern France. He intended to use this force, amounting to 150,000 men, for his planned invasion of Britain; Napoleon was so confident of success that he had commemorative medals struck to celebrate the "conquest" of Britain. Although they never invaded, Napoleon's troops received careful and invaluable training for any possible military operation. Boredom among the troops occasionally set in, but Napoleon paid many visits and conducted lavish parades to boost morale.

The men at Boulogne formed the core of what Napoleon would later call La Grande Armée (The Grand Army). The army was organized into seven corps, which were large field units that contained 36 to 40 cannons each and were capable of independent action until other corps could come to their aid. A single corps (adequately situated in a solid defensive position) could survive at least a day without support. In addition to these forces, Napoleon created a cavalry reserve of 22,000 organized into two cuirassier divisions, four mounted dragoon divisions, one division of dismounted dragoons and one of light cavalry, all supported by 24 artillery pieces. By 1805, the Grande Armée had grown to a force of 350,000 men, who were well equipped, well trained, and led by competent officers.

=== Russian Imperial army ===
The Russian army in 1805 had many characteristics of Ancien Régime organization. There was no permanent formation above the regimental level, senior officers mostly belonged to aristocratic circles, and lower-ranking officers were often undertrained. A Russian soldier was considered steadfast though, backed by fine artillery crewed by tough gunners. From Peter the Great until the war with Napoleonic France in 1805, Russia almost always achieved success in military affairs. During the Italian and Swiss expedition of 1799 the Russians drove the French out of Italy, but they failed in Switzerland.

=== Austrian Imperial army ===
Archduke Charles, brother of the Austrian Emperor, had started to reform the Austrian army in 1801 by taking away power from the Hofkriegsrat, the military-political council responsible for the armed forces. Charles was Austria's most able field commander, but he was unpopular at court and lost much influence when, against his advice, Austria decided to go to war with France. Karl Mack became the new main commander in Austria's army, instituting reforms on the eve of the war that called for a regiment to be composed of four battalions of four companies, rather than three battalions of six companies. The multinationality and -lingualism was a standard Austrian problem. The fighting qualities of the Austrian cavalry were high in 1805, but they were often outnumbered by French horsemen due to Napoleon's new cavalry tactics "en masse". The artillery of 1805 was the best among the entire continental Coalition, but no better than the French.

== Preliminary moves ==
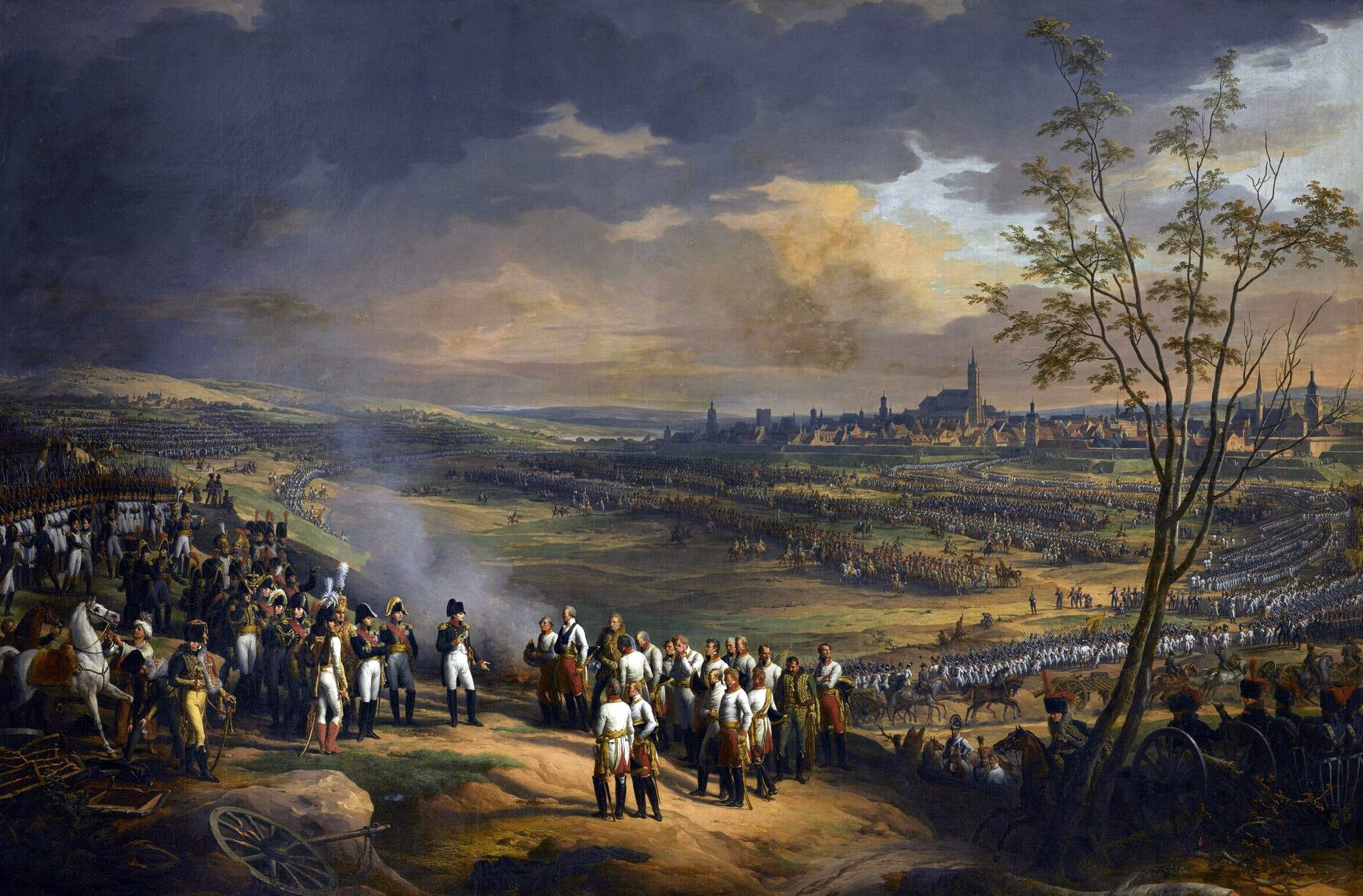
Napoleon accepts the surrender of General Mack and the Austrian army at Ulm. Painting by Charles Thévenin

In August 1805, Napoleon, Emperor of the French since December of the previous year, turned his sights from the English Channel to the Rhine to deal with the new Austrian and Russian threats. On 25 September after a feverish march in great secrecy, 200,000 French troops began to cross the Rhine on a front of 260 km (160 mi). Mack had gathered the greater part of the Austrian army at the fortress of Ulm in Swabia.

Napoleon swung his forces southward in a wheeling movement that put the French at the Austrian rear while launching cavalry attacks through the Black Forest, which kept the Austrians at bay. The Ulm Maneuver was well-executed, and on 20 October, 23,000 Austrian troops surrendered at Ulm, bringing the number of Austrian prisoners of the campaign to 60,000. Although this spectacular victory was soured by the defeat of a Franco-Spanish fleet at Trafalgar the following day, French success on land continued as Vienna fell in November. The French gained 100,000 muskets, 500 cannons, and intact bridges across the Danube.

Delays prevented the Russians from saving the Austrian armies; they withdrew to the northeast to await reinforcements and link up with surviving Austrian units. Tsar Alexander I appointed General Mikhail Illarionovich Kutuzov commander-in-chief of the combined Russo-Austrian force. On 9 September 1805, Kutuzov arrived at the battlefield, quickly contacting Francis I of Austria and his courtiers to discuss strategy and logistics. Under pressure from Kutuzov, the Austrians agreed to supply munitions and weapons promptly. Kutuzov also spotted shortcomings in the Austrian defense plan, which he called "very dogmatic". He objected to the Austrian annexation of the land recently under Napoleon's control because this would make the local people distrust the allied force.

The French followed after Kutuzov but soon found themselves in a difficult position. Prussian intentions were unknown and could be hostile; the Russian and Austrian armies had converged, and French lines of communication were extremely long, requiring strong garrisons to keep them open. Napoleon realized that to capitalize on the success at Ulm, he had to force the Allies to battle and then defeat them.

On the Russian side, Kutuzov also realized Napoleon needed to do battle, so instead of clinging to the "suicidal" Austrian defense plan, Kutuzov decided to retreat. He ordered Pyotr Bagration to contain the French at Vienna with 600 soldiers. He instructed Bagration to accept Murat's ceasefire proposal so the Allied Army could have more time to retreat. It was later discovered that the proposal was false and had been used to launch a surprise attack on Vienna. Nonetheless, Bagration held off the French assault for a time by negotiating an armistice with Murat, thereby giving Kutuzov time to position the Russian rearguard near Hollabrunn.

Murat initially refrained from an attack, believing the entire Russian army stood before him. Napoleon soon realized Murat's mistake and ordered him to pursue quickly, but the allied army had already retreated to Olmütz. According to Kutuzov's plan, the Allies would retreat further to the Carpathian region and "at Galicia, I will bury the French."

Napoleon decided to set a psychological trap to lure the Allies out. Days before any fighting, Napoleon had been giving the impression that his army was weak and desired a negotiated peace. About 53,000 French troops—including Soult, Lannes, and Murat's forces—were assigned to take Austerlitz and the Olmütz road, occupying the enemy's attention. The Allied forces, numbering about 89,000, seemed far superior and would be tempted to attack the outnumbered French army. However, the Allies did not know that Bernadotte, Mortier and Davout were already within supporting distance and could be called in by forced marches—Bernadotte from Iglau, and Mortier and Davout from Vienna—which would raise the French numbers to 75,000 troops.

Napoleon's lure did not stop at that. On 25 November, General Savary was sent to the Allied headquarters at Olmütz to deliver Napoleon's message expressing his desire to avoid a battle, while secretly examining the Allied forces' situation. As expected, the overture was seen as a sign of weakness. When Francis I offered an armistice on the 27th, Napoleon accepted enthusiastically. On the same day, Napoleon ordered Soult to abandon both Austerlitz and the Pratzen Heights and, while doing so, to create an impression of chaos during the retreat that would induce the enemy to occupy the Heights.

The next day (28 November), the French Emperor requested a personal interview with Alexander I. He received a visit from the Tsar's most impetuous aide, Prince Peter Dolgorukov. The meeting was another part of the trap, as Napoleon intentionally expressed anxiety and hesitation to his opponents. Dolgorukov reported an additional indication of French weakness to the Tsar.

The plan was successful. Many Allied officers, including the Tsar's aides and the Austrian Chief of Staff Franz von Weyrother, strongly supported an immediate attack and appeared to sway Tsar Alexander. Kutuzov's plan to retreat further to the Carpathian region was rejected, and the Allied forces soon fell into Napoleon's trap.

== Battle ==
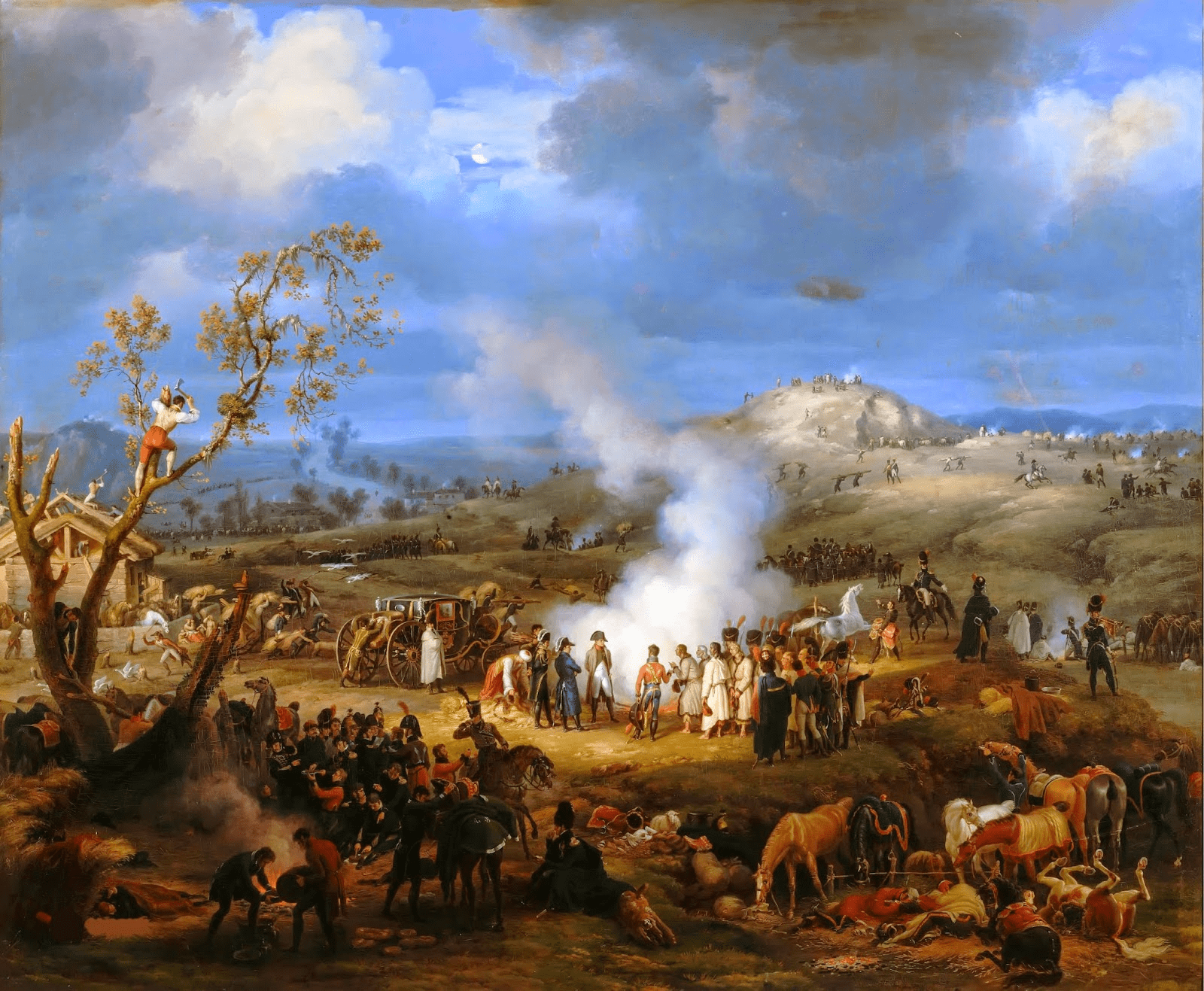
Napoleon with his troops on the eve of battle. Painting by Louis-François, Baron Lejeune

The battle began with the French army outnumbered. Napoleon had some 72,000 men and 157 guns for the impending battle, with about 7,000 troops under Davout still far to the south in the direction of Vienna. The Allies had about 85,000 soldiers, seventy percent of them Russian, and 318 guns.

At first, Napoleon was not confident of victory. In a letter, he requested that Minister of Foreign Affairs Talleyrand not tell anyone about the upcoming battle because he did not want to disturb Empress Joséphine. According to Frederick C. Schneid, the French Emperor's chief worry was how he could explain to Joséphine a French defeat.

=== Battlefield ===
The battle took place about six miles (ten kilometres) southeast of the city of Brno, between that city and Austerlitz (Czech: Slavkov u Brna) in what is now the Czech Republic. The northern part of the battlefield was dominated by the 700-foot (210-metre) Santon Hill and the 880-foot (270-meter) Žuráň Hill, both overlooking the vital Olomouc/Brno road, which was on an east–west axis. To the west of these two hills was the village of Bellowitz (Bedřichovice), and between them, the Bosenitz (Roketnice) stream went south to link up with the Goldbach (Říčka) stream, the latter flowing by the villages of Kobelnitz (Kobylnice), Sokolnitz (Sokolnice), and Telnitz (Telnice).

The centrepiece of the entire area was the Pratzen (Prace) Heights, a gently sloping hill. An aide noted that Napoleon repeatedly told his marshals, "Gentlemen, examine this ground carefully, it is going to be a battlefield; you will have a part to play upon it."

=== Allied plans and dispositions ===
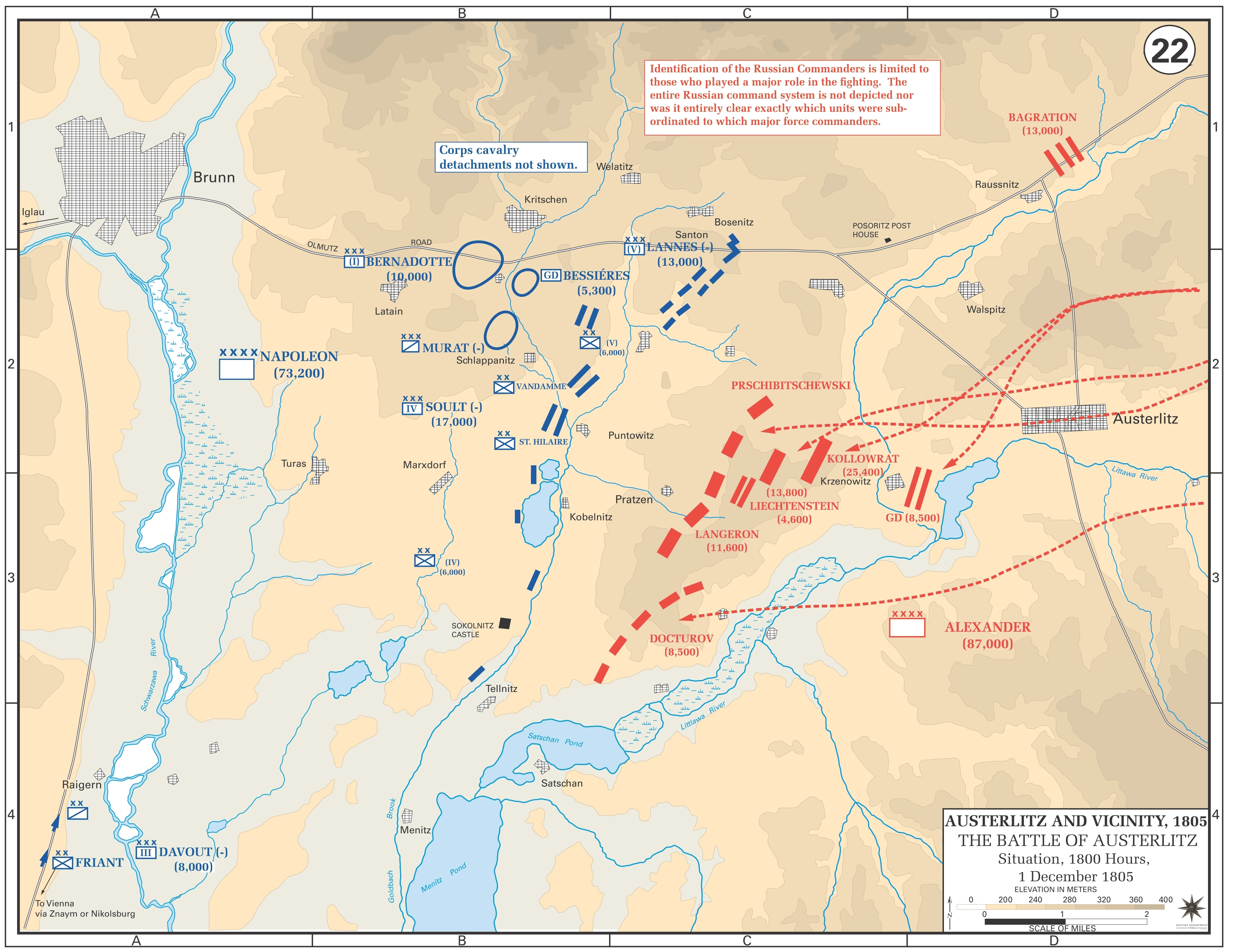
Allied (red) and French (blue) deployments at 1800 hours on 1 December 1805

The Allied council met on 1 December to discuss proposals for the battle. Most Allied strategists had two fundamental ideas: contacting the enemy and securing the southern flank that held the communication line to Vienna. Although the Tsar and his immediate entourage pushed hard for a battle, Emperor Francis of Austria was more cautious, and he was seconded by Kutuzov, the Commander-in-Chief of the Russians and the Allied troops. The pressure to fight from the Russian nobles and the Austrian commanders, however, was too strong, and the Allies adopted the plan of the Austrian Chief-of-Staff, Franz von Weyrother. This called for a main drive against the French right flank, which the Allies noticed was lightly guarded, and diversionary attacks against the French left. The Allies deployed most of their troops into four columns that would attack the French right. The Russian Imperial Guard was held in reserve while Russian troops under Bagration guarded the Allied right. The Russian Tsar stripped Kutuzov of his authority as Commander-in-Chief and gave it to Franz von Weyrother. In the battle, Kutuzov could (mainly) command the IV Corps/Column of the Allied army, although he was still the nominal commander because the Tsar was afraid to take over if his favoured plan failed.

=== French plans and dispositions ===
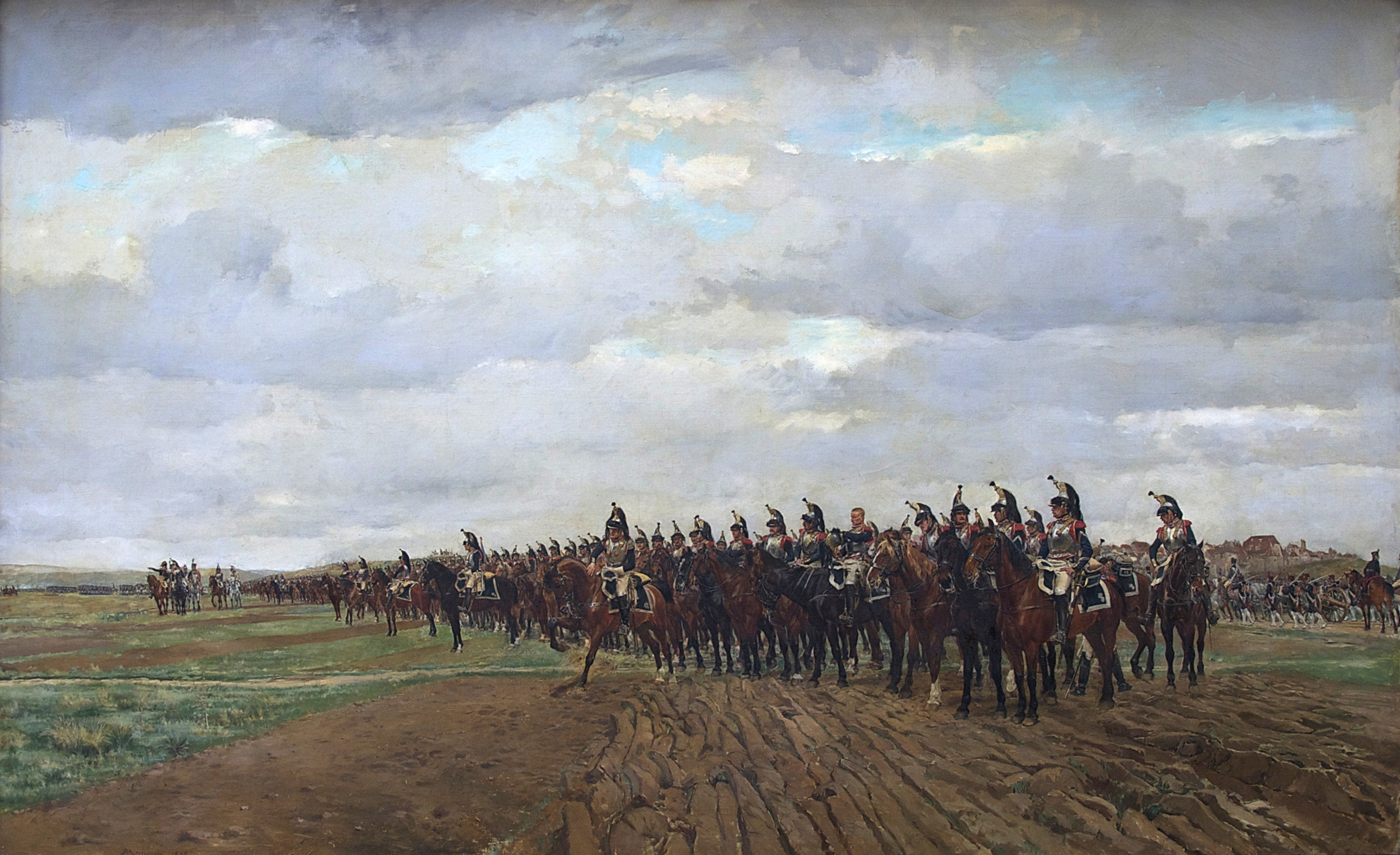
French cuirassiers taking position

Napoleon hoped that the Allied forces would attack, and to encourage them, he deliberately weakened his right flank. On 28 November, Napoleon met with his marshals at Imperial Headquarters, who informed him of their qualms about the forthcoming battle. He shrugged off their suggestion of retreat.

Napoleon's plan envisaged that the Allies would throw many troops to envelop his right flank to cut the French communication line from Vienna. As a result, the Allies' center and left flank would be exposed and become vulnerable. To encourage them to do so, Napoleon abandoned the strategic position on the Pratzen Heights, faking the weakness of his forces and his caution. Meanwhile, Napoleon's main force was to be concealed in a dead ground opposite the Heights. On 1 December Napoleon was finally convinced of the intended outflanking by his opponents, while their camps clearly indicated the extended front of their army. He secretly, during the same day, moved all his troops, except the right flank, to the left bank of the Bosenitz stream, an area of dead ground located between Puntowitz (now Ponětovice) and Girzikowitz (now Jiříkovice). To secure his left flank, from which the retreat to Iglau branched off, he ordered a steep hill on the main Olmütz road to be fortified and armed with 18 cannon; this point (Santon) was occupied by an infantry regiment, which was ordered to defend it to the last extremity. On the afternoon of 1 December, Napoleon gathered his corps commanders and, after outlining the general situation, explained his assumptions and the role he intended for each of them. These verbal orders were communicated to the troops in the form of a written disposition, however, only on the morning of 2 December. In accordance with these instructions, Davout was ordered to defend the Goldbach from Telnitz to Sokolnitz Castle inclusive, meaning he was to hold out first with 5,000, then with 12,500, against Buxhoeveden's 43,000. Buxhoeveden (Buxhöwden) was the commander of the Allied left and the man responsible for leading the attack. For the decisive blow on the center, Napoleon assigned approx. 2/3 of his forces and concentrated them along a front of about 3 kilometres (1.9 mi). The marshals were ordered to appear before Napoleon on 2 December at 7:30 AM to receive new orders depending on the movements that the enemy would make during the night. According to the plan, the French troops would attack and recapture the Pratzen Heights, then from the Heights, they would launch a decisive assault on the center of the Allied army, cripple them, and encircle them from the rear.

If the Russian force leaves the Pratzen Heights in order to go to the right side, they will certainly be defeated.

— Napoleon

The massive thrust through the Allied centre was conducted by 16,000 troops of Soult's IV Corps. IV Corps' position was cloaked by dense mist during the early stage of the battle; in fact, how long the mist lasted was vital to Napoleon's plan: Soult's troops would become uncovered if the mist dissipated too soon, but if it lingered too long, Napoleon would be unable to determine when the Allied troops had evacuated Pratzen Heights, preventing him from timing his attack properly.

Meanwhile, to support his weak right flank, Napoleon ordered Davout's III Corps to force march from Vienna and join General Legrand's men, who held the extreme southern flank that would bear the heaviest part of the Allied attack. Davout's soldiers had 48 hours to march 110 km (68 mi). Their arrival was crucial in determining the success of the French plan. Indeed, the arrangement of Napoleon on the right flank was precarious as the French had only minimal troops garrisoning there. However, Napoleon was able to use such a risky plan because Davout—the commander of III Corps—was one of Napoleon's best marshals, because the right flank's position was protected by a complicated system of streams and lakes, and because the French had already settled upon a secondary line of retreat through Brunn. The Imperial Guard and Bernadotte's I Corps were held in reserve while the V Corps under Lannes guarded the northern sector of the battlefield, where the new communication line was located.

By 1 December 1805, the French troops had been shifted in accordance with the Allied movement southward, as Napoleon expected.

=== Battle begins ===
The battle began at about 8 a.m., with the first allied lines attacking the village of Telnitz, which the 3rd Line Regiment defended. This battlefield sector witnessed heavy fighting in this early action as several ferocious Allied charges evicted the French from the town and forced them onto the other side of the Goldbach. The first men of Davout's corps arrived at this time and threw the Allies out of Telnitz before they, too, were attacked by hussars and re-abandoned the town. Additional Allied attacks out of Telnitz were checked by French artillery.

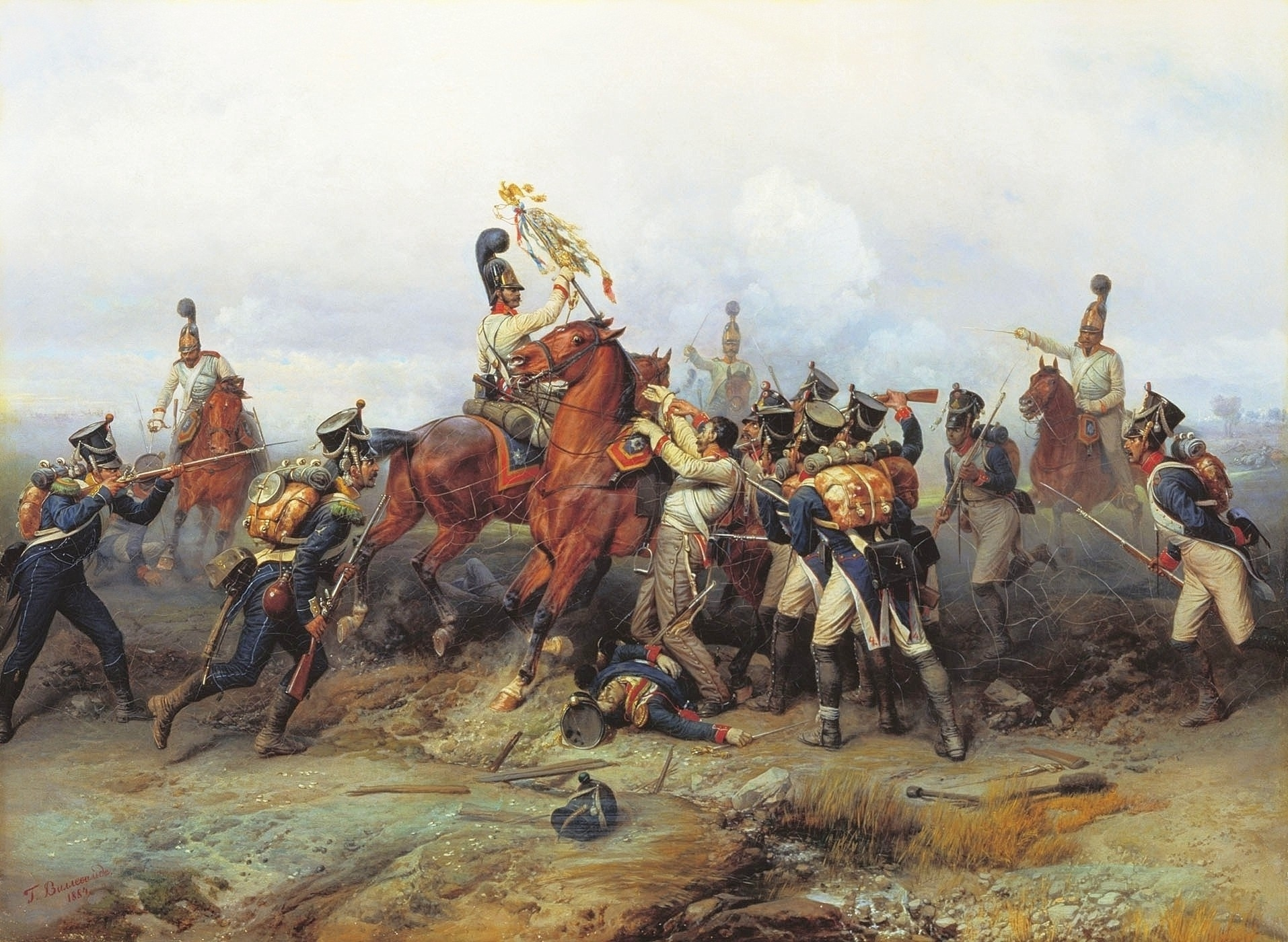
Capture of a French regiment's eagle by the cavalry of the Russian guard, by Bogdan Willewalde (1884)

Allied columns started pouring against the French right, but not at the desired speed, so the French successfully curbed the attacks. The Allied deployments were mistaken and poorly timed: cavalry detachments under Liechtenstein on the Allied left flank had to be placed on the right flank, and in the process, they ran into and slowed down part of the second column of infantry that was advancing towards the French right. At the time, the planners thought this slowing was disastrous, but later on, it helped the Allies. Meanwhile, the leading elements of the second column were attacking the village of Sokolnitz, which was defended by the 26th Light Regiment and the Tirailleurs, French skirmishers. Initial Allied assaults proved unsuccessful, and General Langeron ordered the bombardment of the village. This deadly barrage forced the French out, and at about the same time, the third column under the command of General Przybyszewski (Przhibyshevsky) attacked the castle of Sokolnitz. The French, however, counterattacked and regained the village, only to be thrown out again. Conflict in this area ended temporarily when Friant's division (part of III Corps) retook the village. Sokolnitz was perhaps the most contested area on the battlefield and would change hands several times as the day progressed.

While the Allied troops attacked the French right flank, Kutuzov's IV Corps stopped at the Pratzen Heights and stayed still. Just like Napoleon, Kutuzov realized the importance of Pratzen and decided to protect the position. But the young Tsar did not, so he ordered the IV Corps to withdraw from the Heights. This act quickly pushed the Allied army into its grave.

=== "One sharp blow and the war is over" ===
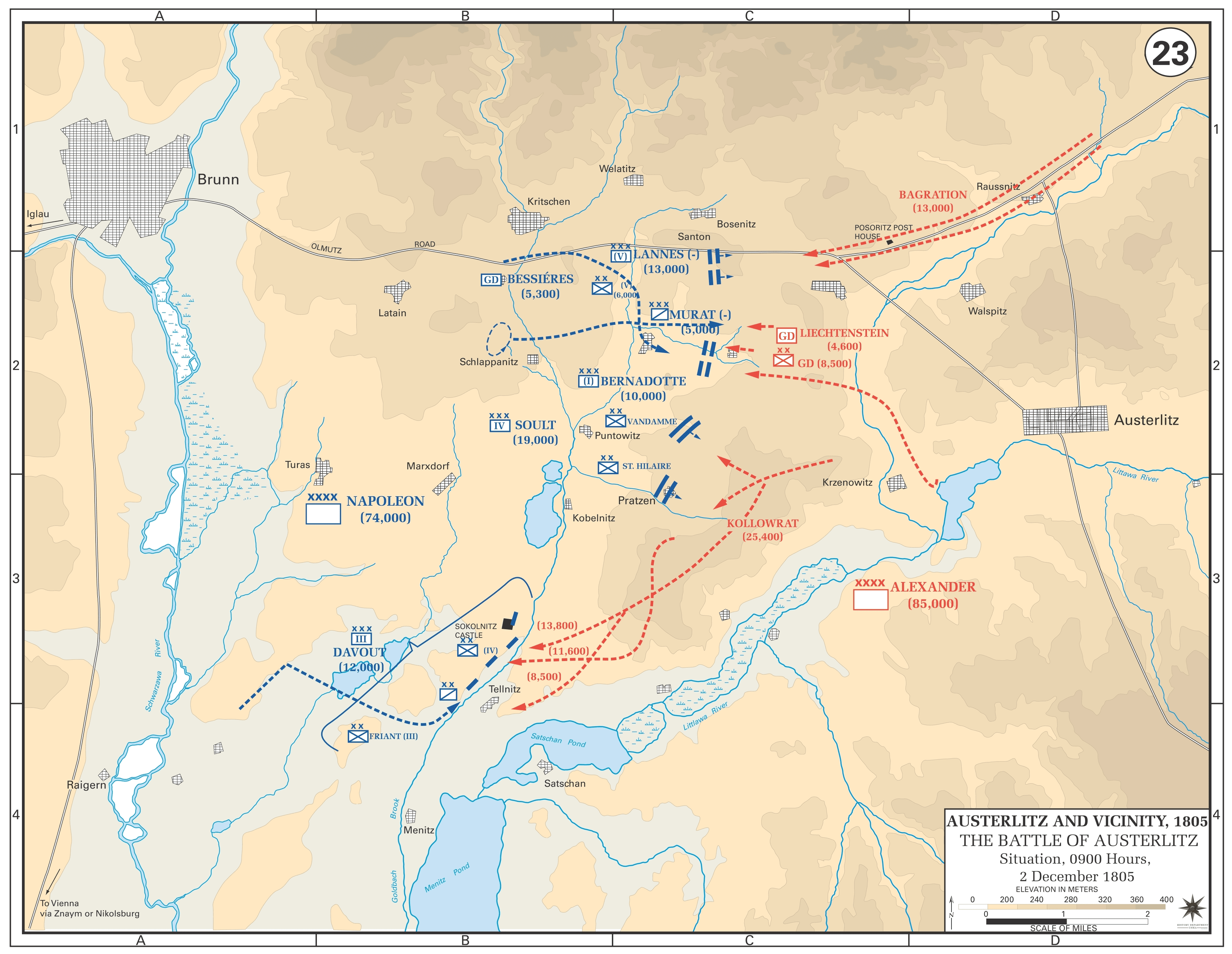
The decisive attacks on the Allied center by St. Hilaire and Vandamme split the Allied army in two and left the French in a golden tactical position to win the battle.

At about 8:45 a.m., the mist was already clearing and Napoleon got a good look at the picture; satisfied at the weakness in the enemy center, Napoleon asked Soult how long it would take for his men to reach the Pratzen Heights, to which the Marshal replied, "Less than twenty minutes, sire." About 15 minutes later, Napoleon ordered the attack, adding, "One sharp blow and the war is over."

A dense fog helped to cloud the advance of St. Hilaire's French division, but as they ascended the slope, the legendary 'Sun of Austerlitz' ripped the mist apart and encouraged them forward. Russian soldiers and commanders on top of the heights were stunned to see so many French troops coming towards them. Allied commanders moved some of the delayed detachments of the fourth column into this bitter struggle. Over an hour of fighting destroyed much of this unit. Mikhail Kutuzov commanded the battle at the location of this column. The other men from the second column, primarily inexperienced Austrians, also participated in the struggle and swung the numbers against one of the best fighting forces in the French army, eventually forcing them to withdraw down the slopes. However, gripped by desperation, St. Hilaire's men struck hard again and bayoneted the Allies out of the heights. To the north, General Vandamme's division attacked an area called Staré Vinohrady ("Old Vineyards") and, through talented skirmishing and deadly volleys, broke several Allied battalions.

The battle had firmly turned in France's favor, but it was far from over. Napoleon ordered Bernadotte's I Corps to support Vandamme's left and moved his command center from Žuráň Hill to St. Anthony's Chapel on the Pratzen Heights. The problematic position of the Allies was confirmed by the decision to send in the Russian Imperial Guard; Grand Duke Constantine, Tsar Alexander's brother, commanded the Guard and counterattacked in Vandamme's section of the field, forcing a bloody effort and the only loss of a French standard in the battle (a battalion of the 4th Line Regiment was defeated). Sensing trouble, Napoleon ordered his own heavy Guard cavalry forward. These men pulverized their Russian counterparts, but with both sides pouring in large masses of cavalry, no victory was clear.

The Russians had a numerical advantage; however, the tide soon swung as Drouet's Division, the 2nd of Bernadotte's I Corps, deployed on the flank of the action and allowed French cavalry to seek refuge behind their lines. The horse artillery of the Guard also inflicted heavy casualties on the Russian cavalry and fusiliers. The Russians broke, and many died as they were pursued by the reinvigorated French cavalry for about a quarter of a mile. Kutuzov was severely wounded, and his son-in-law, Ferdinand von Tiesenhausen, was killed.

=== Endgame ===
I was ... under fierce and continuous canister fire ... Many soldiers, now incessantly engaged in battle from 7 a.m. to 4 p.m., had no cartridges left. I could do nothing but retreat ...

— Lieutenant General Przybyszewski

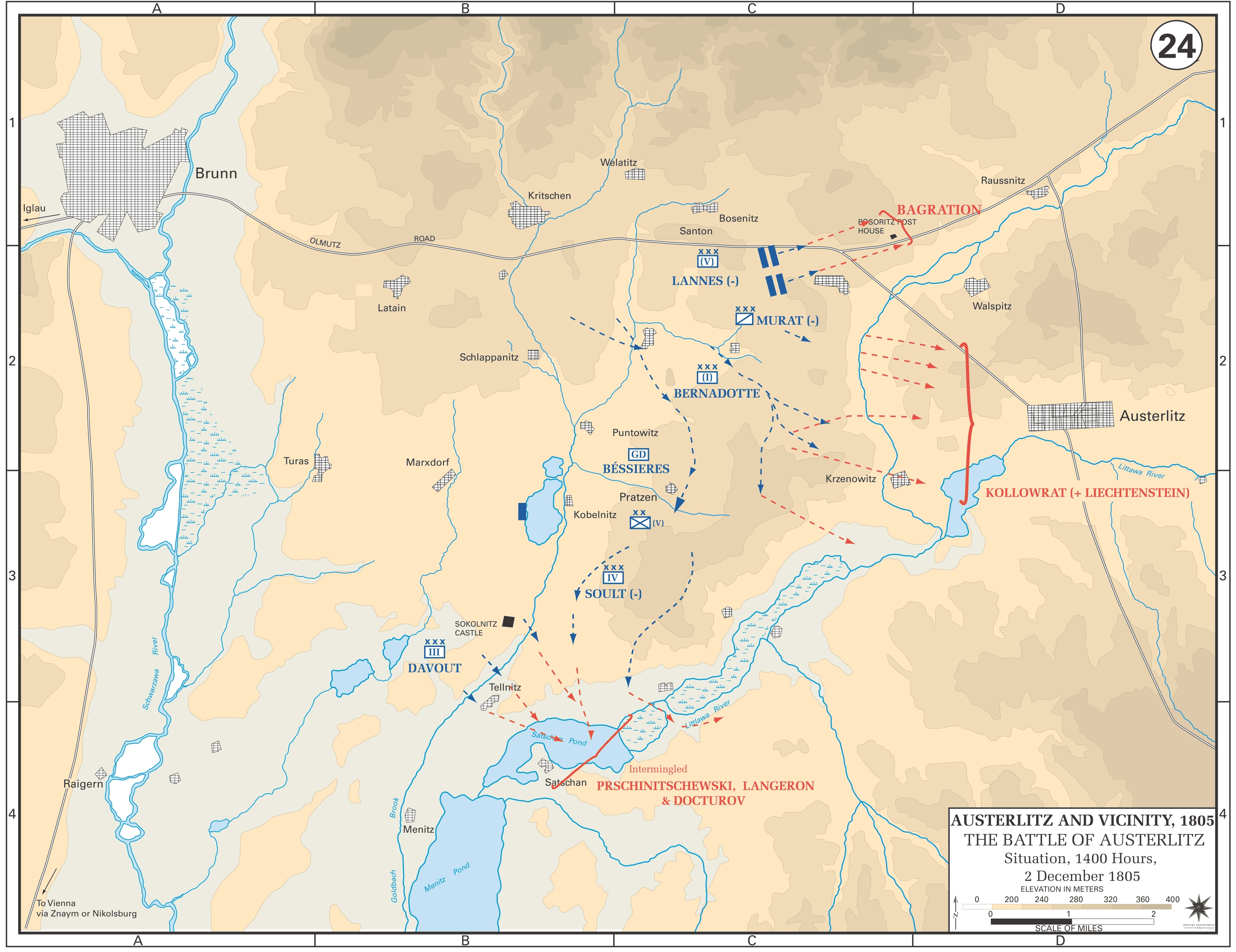
By 1400 hours, the Allied army had been dangerously separated. Napoleon now had the option to strike at one of the wings, and he chose the Allied left since other enemy sectors had already been cleared or were conducting fighting retreats.

Meanwhile, the northernmost part of the battlefield also witnessed heavy fighting. The Prince of Liechtenstein's heavy cavalry began to assault Kellermann's lighter cavalry forces after eventually arriving at the correct position in the field. The fighting initially went well for the French, but Kellerman's forces took cover behind General Caffarelli's infantry division once it became clear that Russian numbers were too great. Caffarelli's men halted the Russian assaults and permitted Murat to send two cuirassier divisions (one commanded by d'Hautpoul and the other one by Nansouty) into the fray to finish off the Russian cavalry for good. The ensuing mêlée was bitter and long, but the French ultimately prevailed. On Napoleon's orders, Lannes then led his V Corps against Bagration's men and, after hard fighting, drove the skilled Russian commander off the field. He wanted to pursue, but Murat, who was in control of this sector on the battlefield, was against the idea; Napoleon ultimately called off the attack.

Napoleon's focus shifted towards the southern end of the battlefield, where the French and the Allies were still fighting over Sokolnitz and Telnitz. In an effective double-pronged assault, St. Hilaire's division and part of Davout's III Corps smashed through the enemy at Sokolnitz, which persuaded the commanders of the first two columns, Generals Kienmayer and Langeron, to flee as fast as they could. Buxhoeveden was completely drunk and fled as well. Kienmayer covered his withdrawal with the O'Reilly light cavalry, who managed to defeat five of six French cavalry regiments before they had to retreat.

General panic seized the Allied army, and it abandoned the field in all possible directions. A famous, albeit disputed, episode occurred during this retreat: defeated Russian forces withdrew south towards Vienna via the frozen Satschan ponds. Napoleon deployed cannons on the heights of Augezd (now Újezd), which decimated the troops now under Dmitry Dokhturov, Buxhoeveden's replacement. French artillery pounded towards the men, and the ice was broken by the bombardment. The fleeing men drowned in the cold ponds, dozens of Russian artillery pieces going down with them. Estimates of how many guns were captured differ: there may have been as few as 38 or more than 100. Sources also differ about casualties, with figures ranging between 200 and 2,000 dead. Thanks to Dokhturov's coolness and resourcefulness, the troops were assembled near Neudorf (now Nová Ves) by nightfall, but with "heavy" losses, as the Russian data confirms without clarifying a specific number. Many drowning Russians were saved by their victorious foes. However, local evidence later made public suggests that Napoleon's account of the catastrophe was exaggerated; on his instructions, the lakes were drained a few days after the battle, and the corpses of only two or three men, with some 150 horses, were found. Tsar Alexander I attested to the incident after the wars.

== Military and political results ==
Allied casualties stood at about 36,000 out of an army of 89,000, representing about 38% of their effective forces. The French were not unscathed in the battle, losing around 9,000 out of an army of 66,000, or about 13% of their forces. The Allies also lost 186 guns and 45 standards. The victory was met by sheer amazement and delirium in Paris, where the nation had been teetering on the brink of financial collapse just days earlier. Napoleon wrote to Josephine, "I have beaten the Austro-Russian army commanded by the two emperors. I am a little weary. ... I embrace you." Napoleon's comments in this letter led to the battle's other famous designation, "Battle of the Three Emperors". However, Napoleon was mistaken as Emperor Francis of Austria was not present on the battlefield. Tsar Alexander perhaps best summed up the harsh times for the Allies by stating, "We are babies in the hands of a giant." After hearing the news of Austerlitz, Pitt said of a map of Europe, "Roll up that map; it will not be wanted these ten years."

France and Austria signed a truce on 4 December, and the Treaty of Pressburg, 22 days later, took the latter out of the war. Austria agreed to recognize French territory captured by the treaties of Campo Formio (1797) and Lunéville (1801), cede land to Bavaria, Württemberg and Baden, which were Napoleon's German allies, pay 40 million francs in war indemnities and cede Venice to the Kingdom of Italy. It was a harsh end for Austria, but certainly not a catastrophic peace. The Russian army was allowed to withdraw to its home territory, and the French ensconced themselves in Southern Germany. The Holy Roman Empire was extinguished, 1806 being seen as its final year. Napoleon created the Confederation of the Rhine, a string of German states meant to serve as a buffer between France and Prussia. Prussia saw these and other moves as an affront to its status as the main power of Central Europe, and it went to war with France in 1806.

== Rewards ==
A few hours after the battle, Napoleon wrote a proclamation with his customary rhetoric:

Even at this hour, before this great day shall pass away and be lost in the ocean of eternity, your Emperor must address you, and express how much he is satisfied with the conduct of all those who have had the good fortune to combat in this memorable battle. Soldiers! you are the first warriors in the world! The recollection of this exploit and of your deeds, will be eternal! thousands of ages hereafter, so long as the events of the universe continue to be related, will record, that a Russian army, of seventy-six thousand men, hired by the gold of England, was annihilated by you on the plains of Olmutz.

The Emperor provided two million golden francs to the higher officers and 200 francs to each soldier, with large pensions for the widows of the fallen, also providing 6,000 francs for the widows of fallen generals. Orphaned children were adopted by Napoleon personally and were allowed to add "Napoleon" to their baptismal and family names. He could afford this, and much else besides, thanks to the return of financial confidence that swept the country as government bonds leaped from 45% to 66% of their face value on the news of victory.

This battle is one of four for which Napoleon never awarded a victory title, the others being Marengo, Jena, and Friedland.

== In popular culture ==
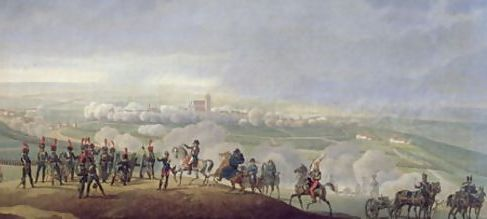
The Battle of Austerlitz, 2 December 1805 by Joseph Swebach-Desfontaines

Artists and musicians on the side of France and her conquests expressed their sentiments in the popular and elite art of the time. Prussian music critic E. T. A. Hoffmann, in his famous review of Beethoven's 5th Symphony,

singles out for special abuse a certain Bataille des trois Empereurs, a French battle symphony by Louis Jadin celebrating Napoleon's victory at Austerlitz.

Leo Tolstoy dramatized the battle as the conclusion of Book 3 and Volume 1 of War and Peace, making it a crucial moment in the lives of both Andrei Bolkonsky, who is badly wounded, and of Nikolai Rostov.

Archibald Alison in his History of Europe (1836) offers the first recorded telling of the apocryphal story that when the Allies descended the Pratzen Heights to attack Napoleon's supposedly weak flank,

The marshals who surrounded Napoleon saw the advantage, and eagerly besought him to give the signal for action; but he restrained their ardour ... "when the enemy is making a false movement we must take good care not to interrupt him."

In subsequent accounts, this Napoleonic quote would undergo various changes until it became: "Never interrupt your enemy when he is making a mistake."

== Historical views ==
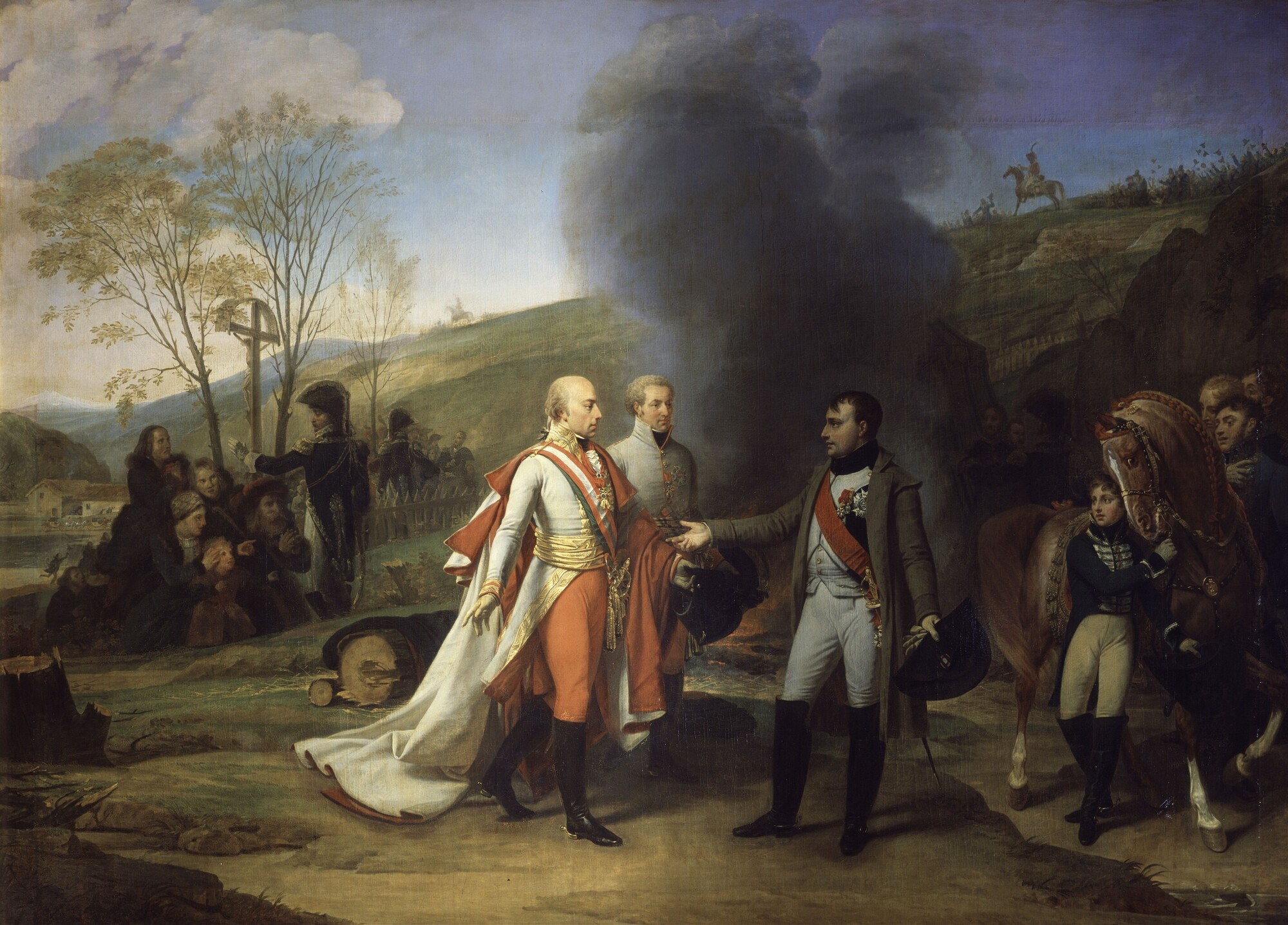
Interview Between Napoleon and Francis II by Antoine-Jean Gros, 1812. Napoleon and Francis I after the Battle of Austerlitz

Napoleon did not succeed in defeating the Allied army as thoroughly as he wanted, but historians and enthusiasts alike recognize that the original plan provided a significant victory, comparable to other great tactical battles such as Cannae. Some historians suggest that Napoleon was so successful at Austerlitz that he lost touch with reality, and what used to be French foreign policy became a "personal Napoleonic one" after the battle. In French history, Austerlitz is acknowledged as an impressive military victory, and in the 19th century, when fascination with the First French Empire was at its height, the battle was revered by French authors such as Victor Hugo, who wrote of the "sound of heavy cannons rolling towards Austerlitz" echoing in the "depths of [his] thoughts". In the 2005 bicentennial, however, controversy erupted when neither French President Jacques Chirac nor Prime Minister Dominique de Villepin attended any functions commemorating the battle. On the other hand, some residents of France's overseas departments protested against what they viewed as the "official commemoration of Napoleon", arguing that Austerlitz should not be celebrated since they believed that Napoleon committed genocide against colonial people.

After the battle, Tsar Alexander I blamed Kutuzov, the Commander-in-Chief of the Allied Army. However, Kutuzov planned to retreat farther to the rear, where the Allied Army had a sharp advantage in logistics. Had the Allied Army retreated further, it might have been reinforced by Archduke Charles's troops from Italy, and the Prussians might have joined the Coalition against Napoleon. A French army at the end of its supply lines, in a place that had no food supplies, might have faced an ending very different from the one it achieved at Austerlitz.

== Monuments and protection of the area ==
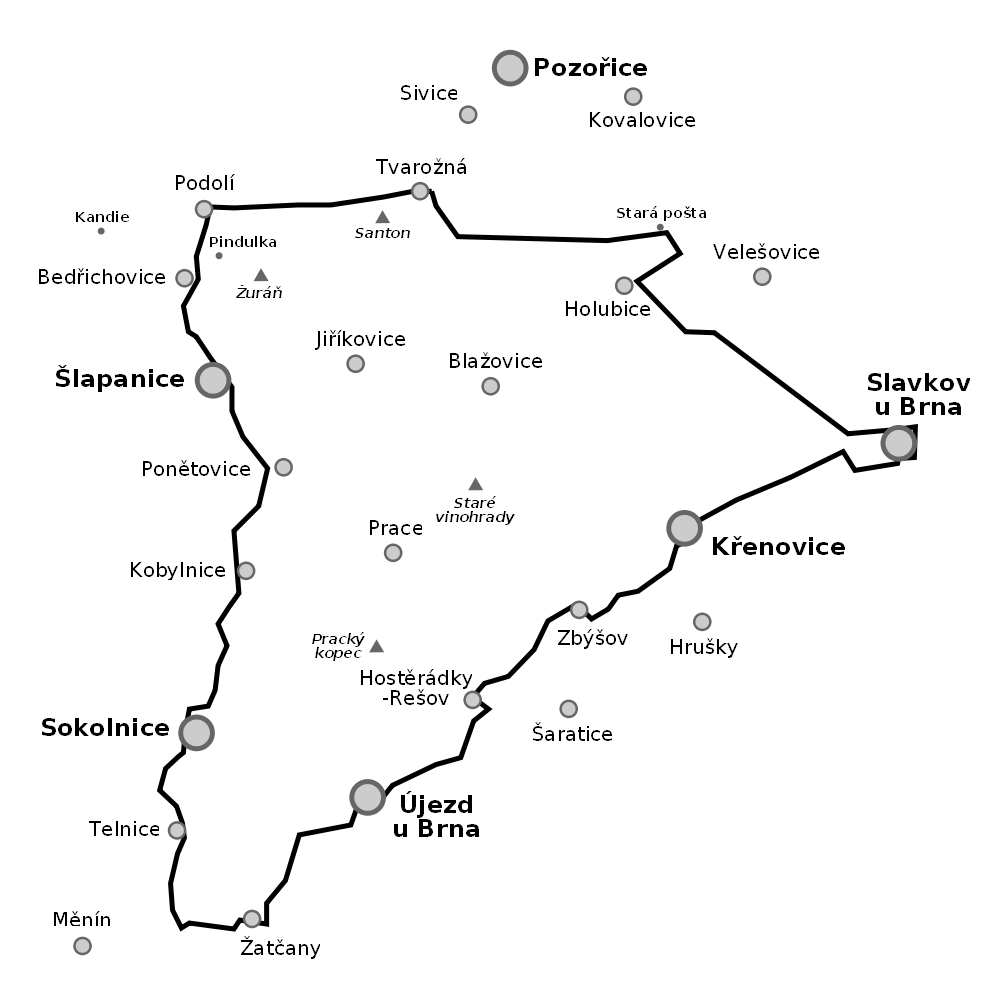
Map of the landscape monument zone

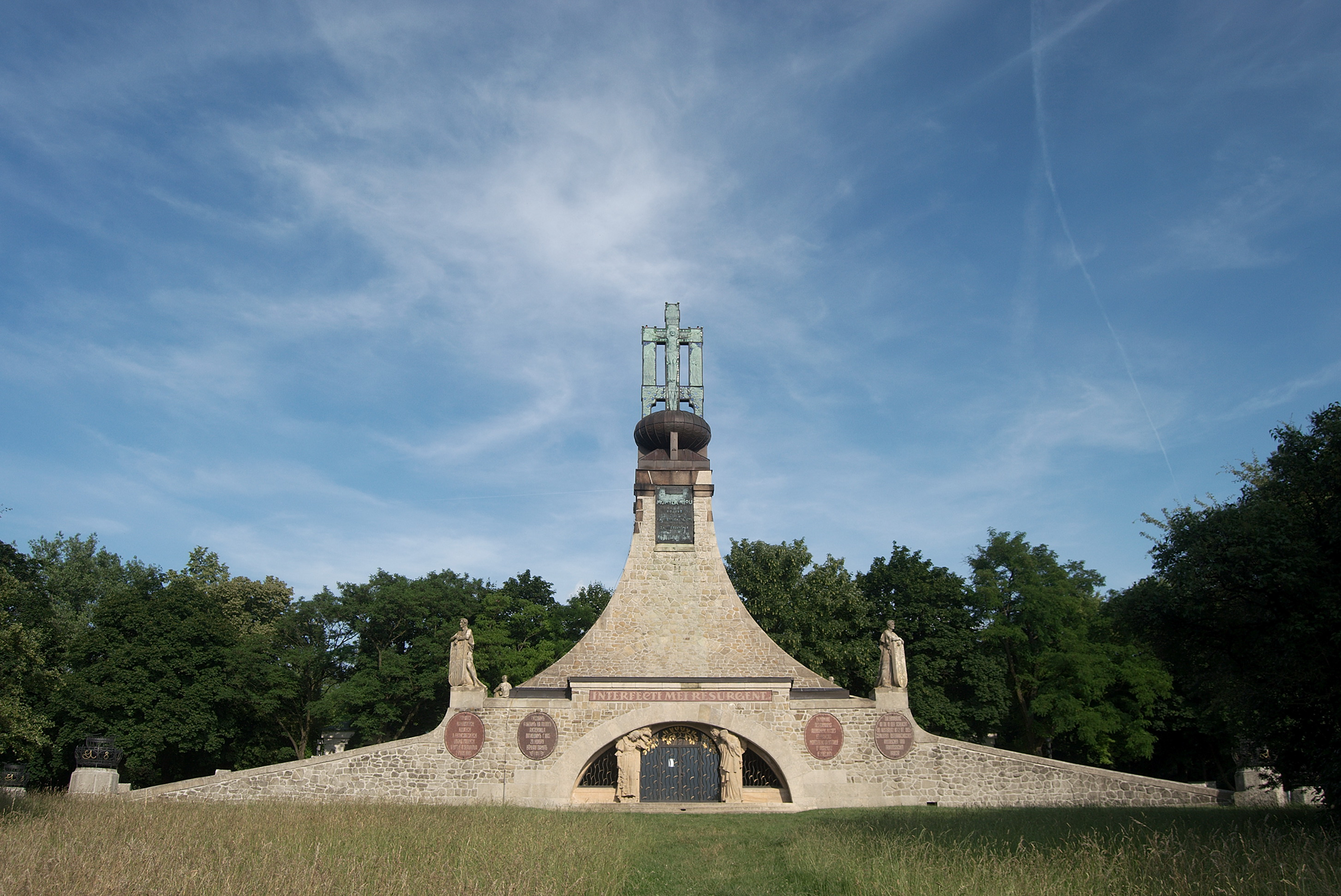
Cairn of Peace Memorial on the battlefield of Austerlitz

In the years following the battle, many memorials were set up around the affected villages to commemorate both the individual episodes of the battle and the thousands of its victims. Since 1992, the area where the Battle of Austerlitz took place has been protected by law as a landscape monument zone. Its value lies in the historical peculiarities of the place, the historical connections of settlements, landscapes, and terrain formations, and the overall landscape image. The area extends to 19 of today's municipalities:

- Blažovice
- Holubice
- Hostěrádky-Rešov
- Jiříkovice
- Kobylnice
- Křenovice
- Podolí
- Ponětovice
- Prace
- Sivice
- Šlapanice
- Slavkov u Brna
- Sokolnice
- Telnice
- Tvarožná
- Újezd u Brna
- Velatice
- Žatčany
- Zbýšov

Near Prace is the Cairn of Peace Memorial, claimed to be the first peace memorial in Europe. It was designed and built in the Art Nouveau style by Josef Fanta in 1910–1912. World War I postponed the monument's dedication until 1923. It is 26 metres (85 ft) high, square, with four female statues symbolizing France, Austria, Russia, and Moravia. Within is a chapel with an ossuary. A nearby small museum commemorates the battle. Every year, the events of the Battle of Austerlitz are commemorated in a ceremony.

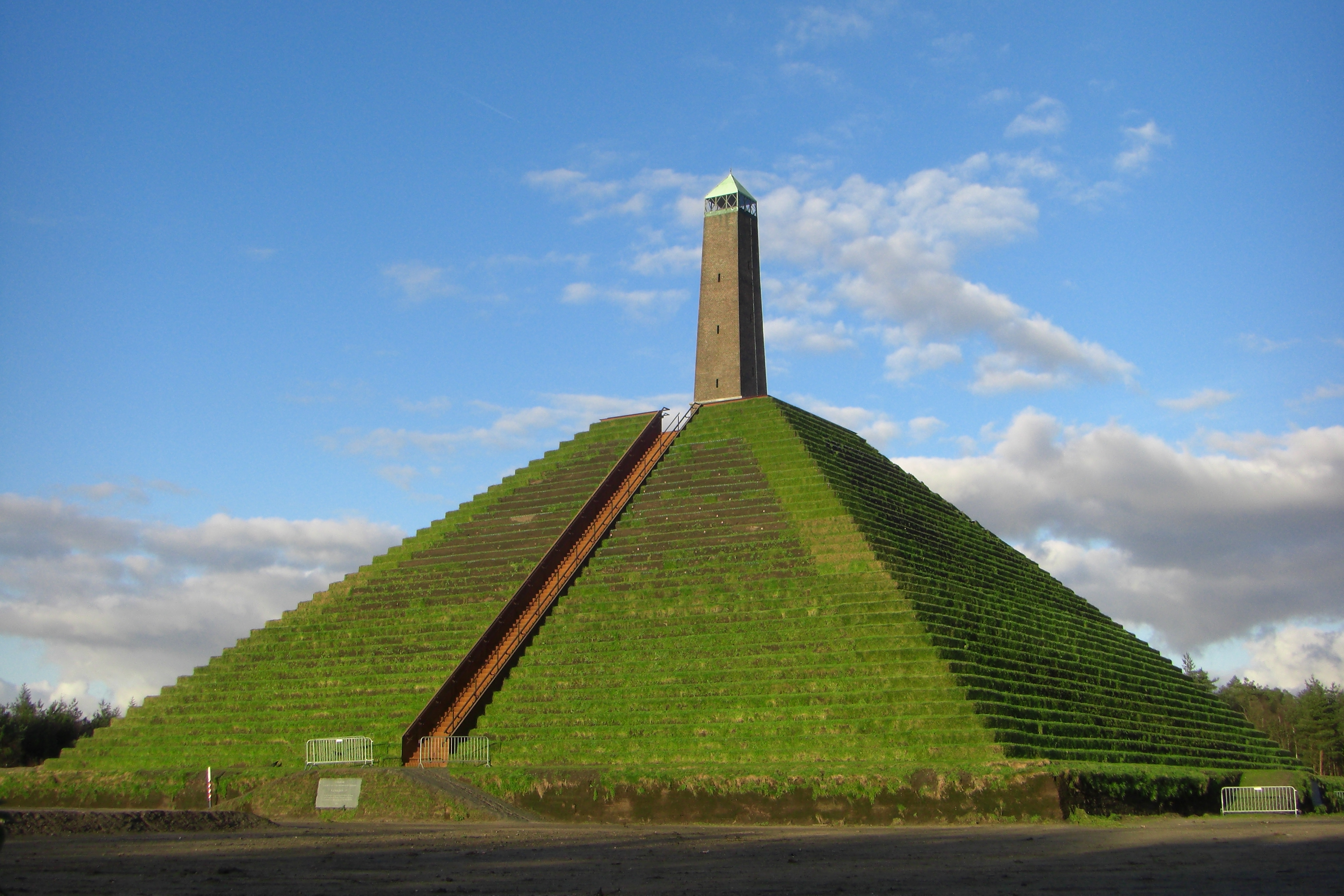
Pyramid of Austerlitz near Utrecht

Other memorials located in the monument zone include, among others:

- The Staré Vinohrady height near Zbýšov saw the bloody collision of the French and Russian guards. In 2005, the Monument to the Three Emperors was erected here.
- Stará Pošta ('old post') in Kovalovice is an original building from 1785, which now serves as a hotel and restaurant. On 28 November 1805, the French cavalry general Murat set up his headquarters here. On the day of the battle, the Russian general Bagration had his headquarters here. After the battle, Napoleon slept in this house and held preliminary negotiations about an armistice. A small museum commemorates these events.
- On Santon Hill in Tvarožná is a small white chapel. The hill was a mainstay of the French position and allowed the French artillery to dominate the northern portion of the battlefield. Below the hill, the yearly historical reenactments take place.
- On Žuráň Hill, where Napoleon was headquartered, a granite monument depicts the battlefield positions.
- Slavkov Castle, where an armistice was signed between Austria and France after the battle on 6 December 1805. There is a small historical museum and a multimedia presentation about the battle.

Several monuments to the battle can be found far beyond the battle area. A notable monument is the Pyramid of Austerlitz, built by French soldiers stationed there to commemorate the 1805 campaign near Utrecht in the Netherlands. In Paris, the 44-metre-high (144 ft) bronze Colonne Vendôme, a celebration of Napoleon, also stands on the Place Vendôme. The monument was initially called the Column of Austerlitz and, according to propaganda, was cast from the melted-down barrels of Allied guns from the Battle of Austerlitz. Several other sites and public buildings commemorate the encounter in Paris, such as Pont d'Austerlitz and nearby Gare d'Austerlitz. A scene from the battle is also depicted on the bas-relief of the eastern pillar of the Arc de Triomphe and Arc de Triomphe du Carrousel.

== See also ==
- Gare d'Austerlitz
- Military career of Napoleon

== General references ==
- Addington, L. F. (1984). The Patterns of War Since the Eighteenth Century. Bloomington: Indiana University Press. ISBN 978-0-25330-132-1.
- Bassett, R. (2015). For God and Kaiser: The Imperial Austrian Army, 1619–1918. New Haven, Connecticut: Yale University Press. ISBN 978-0-30021-310-2.
- Bodart, Gaston (2016) [1916]. Losses of Life in Modern Wars. Oxford: Clarendon Press. ISBN 978-1371465520.
- Bowden, Scott (1997). Napoleon and Austerlitz: An Unprecedentedly Detailed Combat Study of Napoleon's Epic Ulm-Austerlitz Campaigns of 1805. Armies of the Napoleonic Wars Research Series, 'The Glory Years' of 1805–1807. Vol. 1. ISBN 978-0-9626-6557-8. OCLC 37778325. OL 3987035M.
- Brooks, Richard, ed. (2000). Atlas of World Military History. London: HarperCollins. ISBN 0-7607-2025-8.
- Bogdanovich, Modest (1869). История царствования императора Александра I [The History of the Reign of Emperor Alexander I]. Vol. 2. Saint Petersburg: Типография Ф. С. Сущинского.
- Brose, Eric Dorn (2013). German history, 1789–1871: From the Holy Roman Empire to the Bismarckian Reich. New York: Berghahn Books. ISBN 9781782380047.
- Castle, Ian (2002). Austerlitz 1805: The Fate of Empires. Oxford: Osprey Publishing. ISBN 1-84176-136-2.
- Castle, Ian (2005). Austerlitz: Napoleon and the Eagles of Europe. Pen & Sword Books. ISBN 1-84415-171-9.
- Chandler, David G. (1966a). The Campaigns of Napoleon. New York: Simon & Schuster. OCLC 185576578.
- Chandler, David G. (1966b). The Campaigns of Napoleon. New York: Macmillan.
- Chandler, David G. (1995). The Campaigns of Napoleon. New York: Simon & Schuster. ISBN 9781439131039. OCLC 185576578.
- Cook, C.; Paxton, J. (1981). European Political Facts 1789–1848. London: Palgrave Macmillan. ISBN 978-1-34903-308-9.
- de Méneval, Claude-François (1910). de Méneval, Napoléon Joseph Erenst; Collier, Peter Fenelon (eds.). Memoirs of Napoleon Bonaparte: The Court of the First Empire. Vol. II. New York: P.F. Collier & Son Publishers. OCLC 566100622 – via Internet Archive.
- Dupuy, Trevor N. (1990). Understanding Defeat: How to Recover from Loss in Battle to Gain Victory in War. Paragon House. ISBN 1-5577-8099-4.
- Farwell, Byron (2001). The Encyclopedia of Nineteenth-century Land Warfare: An Illustrated World View. New York: W. W. Norton and Company. ISBN 0-393-04770-9.
- Fisher, T.; Fremont-Barnes, G. (2004). The Napoleonic Wars: The Rise and Fall of an Empire. Oxford: Osprey. ISBN 978-1-84176-831-1.
- Gallaher, J. G. (2008). Napoleon's Enfant Terrible: General Dominique Vandamme. Campaigns and Commanders 15. Norman: University of Oklahoma Press. ISBN 978-0-80613-875-6.
- Gerges, M. T. (2016). "Chapter 6: Ulm and Austerlitz". In Leggiere, M. V. (ed.). Napoleon and the Operational Art of War: Essays in Honor of Donald D. Horward. History of Warfare no. 110. Leiden: Brill. pp. 221–248. ISBN 978-90-04310-03-2.
- Goetz, Robert. 1805: Austerlitz: Napoleon and the Destruction of the Third Coalition (Greenhill Books, 2005). ISBN 1-85367-644-6.
- Nicholls, David (2000). Napoleon: a biographical companion. Oxford: ABC-Clio. ISBN 9780874369571.
- Schneid, Frederick C. (2005). Napoleon's conquest of Europe: the War of the Third Coalition. Westport: Praeger. ISBN 9780275980962.
- Fremont-Barnes, Gregory (2010). Napoleon Bonaparte: leadership, strategy, conflict. Oxford: Osprey Publishing. ISBN 978-1-84603-458-9.
- Abbott, John S. C. (1888). Austerlitz. The History of Napoleon Bonaparte. Vol. L. London: Harper & Brothers.
- Rose, J. Holland; Reginald L. Poole, eds. (1902). "The Ice Incident at the Battle of Austerlitz". The English Historical Review. XVII (67). Oxford: Oxford University Press: 537–538. doi:10.1093/ehr/XVII.LXVII.537. ISSN 0013-8266. JSTOR 00138266. LCCN 05040370. OCLC 474766029.
- Stanhope, Philip Henry (1867). Life of the Rt Hon. William Pitt. Vol. iv. London: Murray. OCLC 1243782331.
- Alison, Archibald (1836). History of Europe from the Commencement of the French Revolution in 1789 to the Restoration of the Bourbons in 1815. Vol. 5. London: Thomas Cadell.
- Gilbert, Adrian (2000). The Encyclopedia of Warfare: From Earliest Time to the Present Day. London: Taylor & Francis. ISBN 978-1-57958-216-6.
- Grainger, J.D. (2004). The Amiens Truce: Britain and Bonaparte, 1801–1803. Woodbridge: Boydell Press. ISBN 978-1-84383-041-2.
- Grehan, J.; Mace, M. (2013). British Battles of the Napoleonic Wars 1793–1806: Despatched from the Front. Barnsley: Pen and Sword. ISBN 978-1-78159-332-5.
- Hall, Walter Phelps; Davis, William Sterns (1957). The Course of Europe Since Waterloo (4th ed.). New York: Appleton-Century-Crofts.
- Jorgensen, C. (2004). The Anglo-Swedish Alliance Against Napoleonic France. London: Palgrave Macmillan. ISBN 978-0-23028-774-7.
- Kagan, F. (2006). The End of the Old Order: Napoleon and Europe, 1801–1805. London: Hachette Books. ISBN 978-0-30681-645-1.
- Kobtzeff, O. (2016). "Napoleonic Wars: Art of War, Diplomacy and Imperialism". In GardnerH.KobtzeffO. (ed.). The Ashgate Research Companion to War: Origins and Prevention. London: Routledge. ISBN 978-1-31704-110-8.
- Kopecký, František (2006). 200 let tradic bitvy u Slavkova: vydáno k 40. výročí prvního příjezdu Norberta Brassinna na slavkovské bojiště (in Czech). Brno, Czech Republic: Onufrius. ISBN 80-903432-5-2. OCLC 842394018.
- Kuehn, J. T. (2015). Napoleonic Warfare: The Operational Art of the Great Campaigns. Santa Barbara, California: ABC-CLIO. ISBN 978-1-44083-308-3.
- Lane-Poole, S. (1894). Coins and Medals: Their Place in History and Art (2nd ed.). London: E. Stock. OCLC 1114793772.
- Lê, Phụng Hoàng; Nguyễn, Thị Thư (2001). Lê, Vinh Quốc (ed.). Các nhân vật lịch sử cận đại. Tập II: Nga (in Vietnamese). Nhà xuất bản Giáo dục.
- Lyons, M. (1994). Napoleon Bonaparte and the Legacy of the French Revolution. New York: St. Martin's Press. ISBN 978-0-31212-123-5.
- Marbot, Jean-Baptiste Antoine Marcelin. "The Battle of Austerlitz", Napoleon: Symbol for an Age, A Brief History with Documents, ed. Rafe Blaufarb (New York: Bedford/St Martin's, 2008), 122–123.
- McLynn, Frank (1997). Napoleon: A Biography. New York: Arcade Publishing Inc. ISBN 1-55970-631-7.
- Mikaberidze, Alexander (February 2006). "A Few Notes on the Russian Losses at Austerlitz". The Napoleon Series. The Waterloo Association.
- Mikaberidze, A. (2005). Russian Officer Corps of the Revolutionary and Napoleonic Wars. New York: Savas Beatie. ISBN 978-1-61121-002-6.
- Mikhailovsky-Danilevsky, Alexander (1844). Описание первой войны императора Александра с Наполеоном в 1805 году [Description of the First War between Emperor Alexander and Napoleon in 1805]. Saint Petersburg: Типография Штаба Отдельного Корпуса Внутренней Стражи.
- Novitsky, Vasily (1911). "Аустерлицъ" [Austerlitz]. Военная энциклопедия Сытина (in Russian). Vol. 3: Аральская флотилия – Афонское сражение. Moscow: Типография Т-ва И. Д. Сытина. pp. 258–263.
- Pearson, R. (1994). The Longman Companion to European Nationalism 1789–1920. London: Routledge. ISBN 978-1-31789-777-4.
- Roberts, Andrew (2014). Napoleon, A Life. New York: Penguin Group. ISBN 978-0-670-02532-9.
- Rumph, Stephen (1995). "A Kingdom Not of This World: The Political Context of E. T. A. Hoffmann's Beethoven Criticism". 19th-Century Music. 19 (1): 50–67. doi:10.2307/746719. JSTOR 746719.
- Schroeder, P.W. (1996). The Transformation of European Politics, 1763–1848 (1st pbk ed.). Oxford: Clarendon Press. ISBN 978-0-19820-654-5.
- Sokolov, Oleg (2019). Битва трех императоров. Наполеон, Россия и Европа. 1799–1805 [The Battle of the Three Emperors. Napoleon, Russia and Europe. 1799–1805] (in Russian). Saint Petersburg: Piter. ISBN 978-5-4461-1047-6.
- Tibbetts, J. (2016). 50 Great Military Leaders of All Time. New Delhi: Vij Books. ISBN 978-9-38550-566-9.
- Tolstoy, Leo. War and Peace. London: Penguin Group, 1982. ISBN 0-14-044417-3
- Uffindell, Andrew (2003). Great Generals of the Napoleonic Wars. Kent, UK: Spellmount Ltd. ISBN 1-86227-177-1.
- Wasson, J.N. (2014). Innovator or Imitator: Napoleon's Operational Concepts and the Legacies of Bourcet and Guibert. Pickle Partners. ISBN 978-1-78289-587-9.
- Wood, W.J. (1997). Civil War Generalship: The Art of Command. Westport, CT: Greenwood Publishing Group. ISBN 978-0-27595-054-5.

Preceded by Battle of Schöngrabern	Napoleonic Wars; Battle of Austerlitz	Succeeded by Siege of Gaeta (1806)
