= Kovalovice =

- Municipality
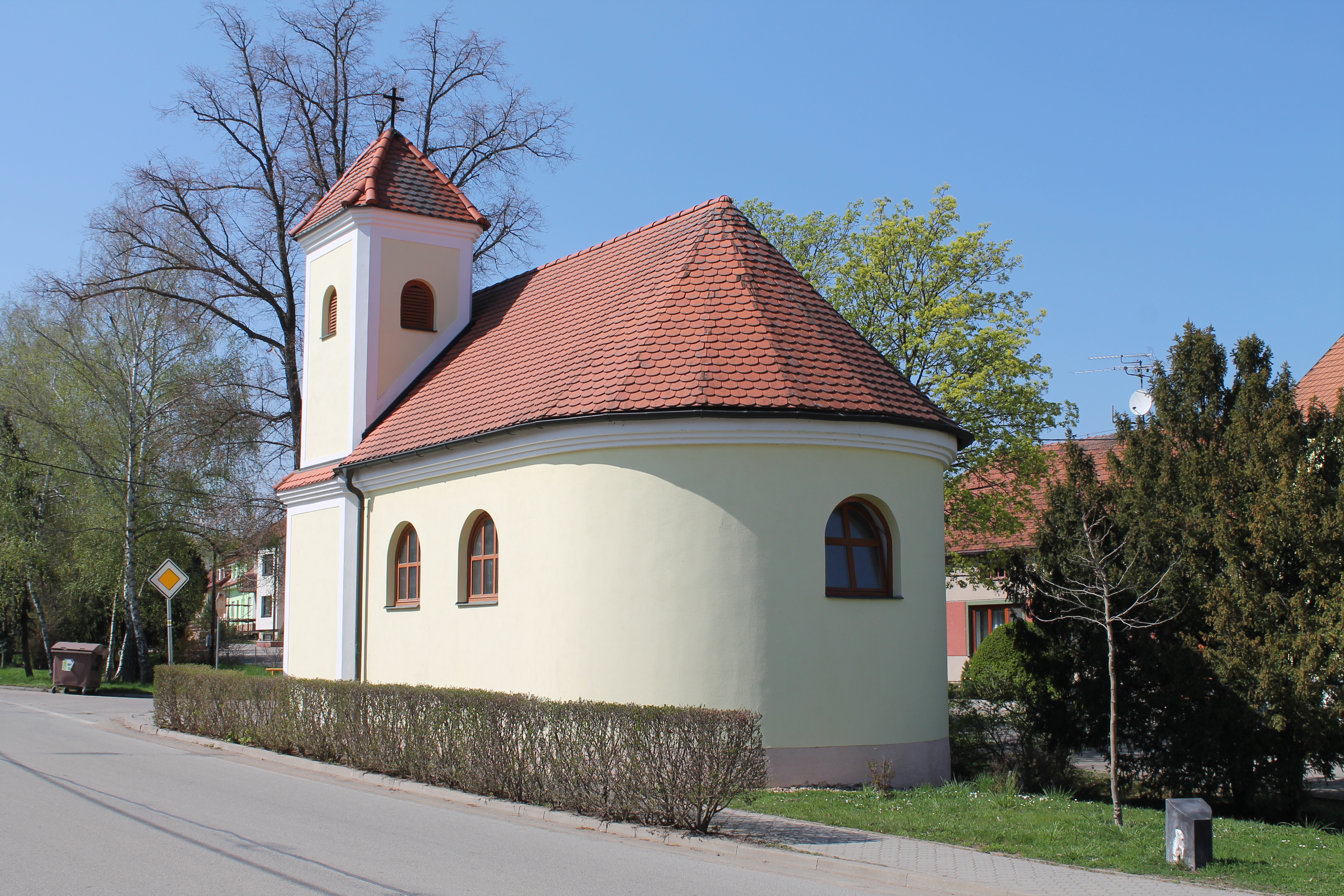
- Chapel of Saints Peter and Paul

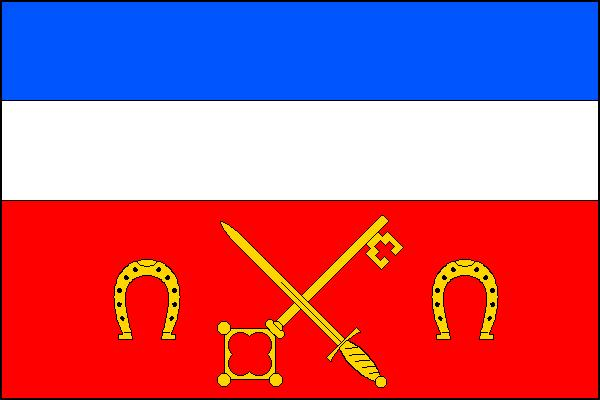
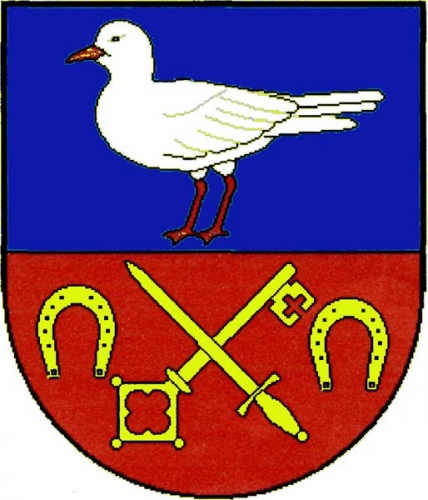
- Flag Coat of arms

- Location in the Czech Republic
- Coordinates: 49°12′17″N 16°49′9″E
- Country: Czech Republic
- Region: South Moravian
- District: Brno-Country
- First mentioned: 1210

Area
  - Total: 4.71 km^{2} (1.82 sq mi)
- Elevation: 256 m (840 ft)

Population (2026-01-01)
  - Total: 679
  - Density: 144/km^{2} (373/sq mi)
- Time zone: UTC+1 (CET)
  - Summer (DST): UTC+2 (CEST)
- Postal code: 664 06
- Website: www.kovalovice.cz

Kovalovice is a municipality and village in Brno-Country District in the South Moravian Region of the Czech Republic. It has about 700 inhabitants.

Kovalovice lies approximately 15 kilometres (9 mi) east of Brno and 199 km (124 mi) south-east of Prague.

== Demographics ==
Historical population
Year	Pop.	±%
1869	648	—
1880	696	+7.4%
1890	732	+5.2%
1900	776	+6.0%
1910	785	+1.2%
1921	705	−10.2%
1930	714	+1.3%
1950	729	+2.1%
1961	721	−1.1%
1970	660	−8.5%
1980	657	−0.5%
1991	553	−15.8%
2001	580	+4.9%
2011	597	+2.9%
2021	666	+11.6%
Source: Censuses
