= Blažovice =

- Municipality
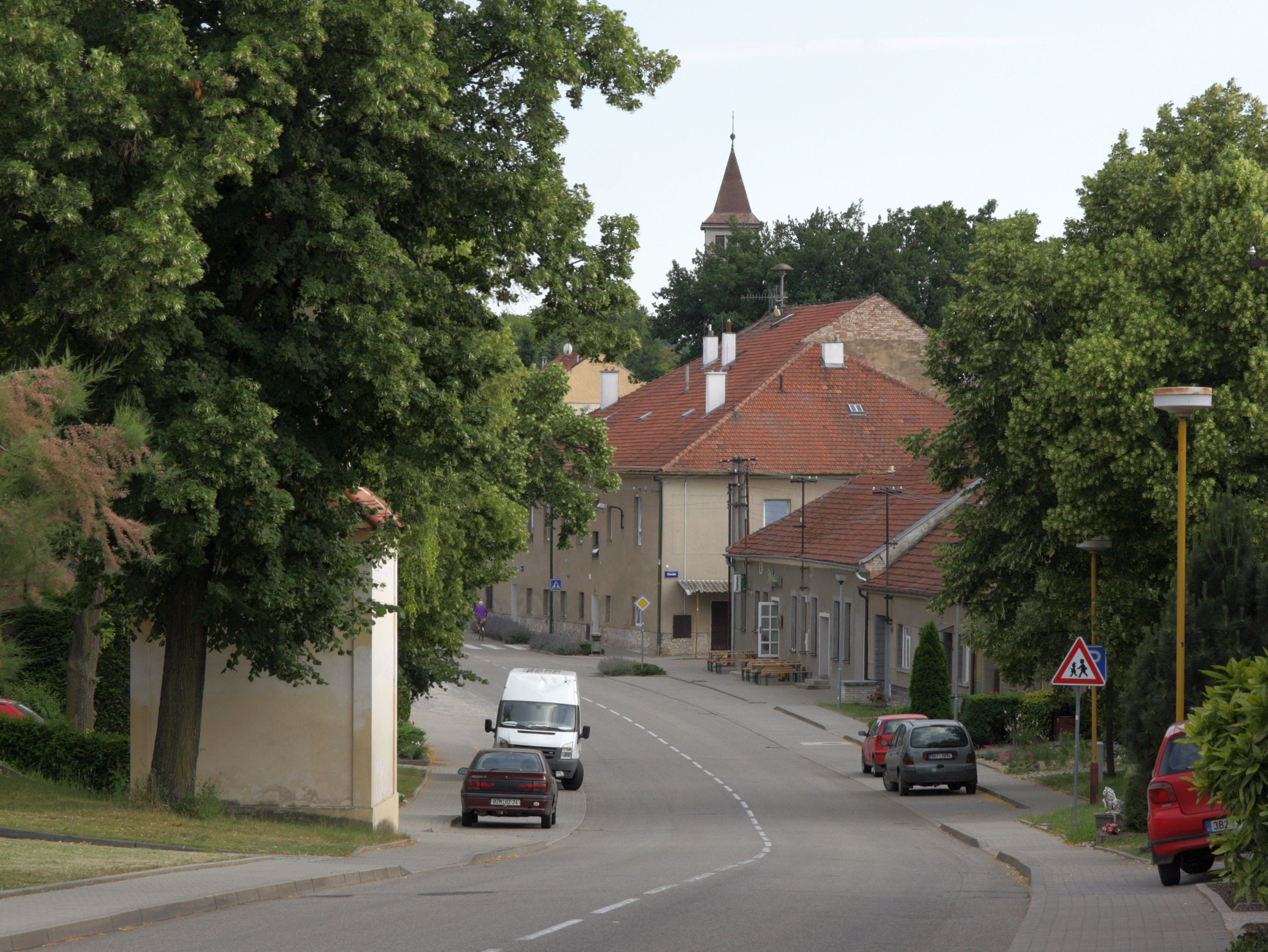
- Centre of Blažovice

- Flag Coat of arms

- Location in the Czech Republic
- Coordinates: 49°9′57″N 16°47′10″E
- Country: Czech Republic
- Region: South Moravian
- District: Brno-Country
- First mentioned: 1141

Area
  - Total: 5.94 km^{2} (2.29 sq mi)
- Elevation: 242 m (794 ft)

Population (2026-01-01)
  - Total: 1,243
  - Density: 209/km^{2} (542/sq mi)
- Time zone: UTC+1 (CET)
  - Summer (DST): UTC+2 (CEST)
- Postal code: 664 08
- Website: www.blazovice.eu

Blažovice is a municipality and village in Brno-Country District in the South Moravian Region of the Czech Republic. It has about 1,200 inhabitants.

Blažovice lies approximately 14 kilometres (9 mi) east of Brno and 200 km (120 mi) south-east of Prague.

== Demographics ==
Historical population
| Year | Pop. | ±% |
|---|---|---|
| 1869 | 524 | — |
| 1880 | 601 | +14.7% |
| 1890 | 693 | +15.3% |
| 1900 | 688 | −0.7% |
| 1910 | 763 | +10.9% |
| 1921 | 881 | +15.5% |
| 1930 | 1,033 | +17.3% |
| 1950 | 1,012 | −2.0% |
| 1961 | 1,081 | +6.8% |
| 1970 | 1,159 | +7.2% |
| 1980 | 1,092 | −5.8% |
| 1991 | 1,078 | −1.3% |
| 2001 | 1,078 | +0.0% |
| 2011 | 1,119 | +3.8% |
| 2021 | 1,234 | +10.3% |
Source: Censuses
