= Kobylnice (Brno-Country District) =

- Municipality
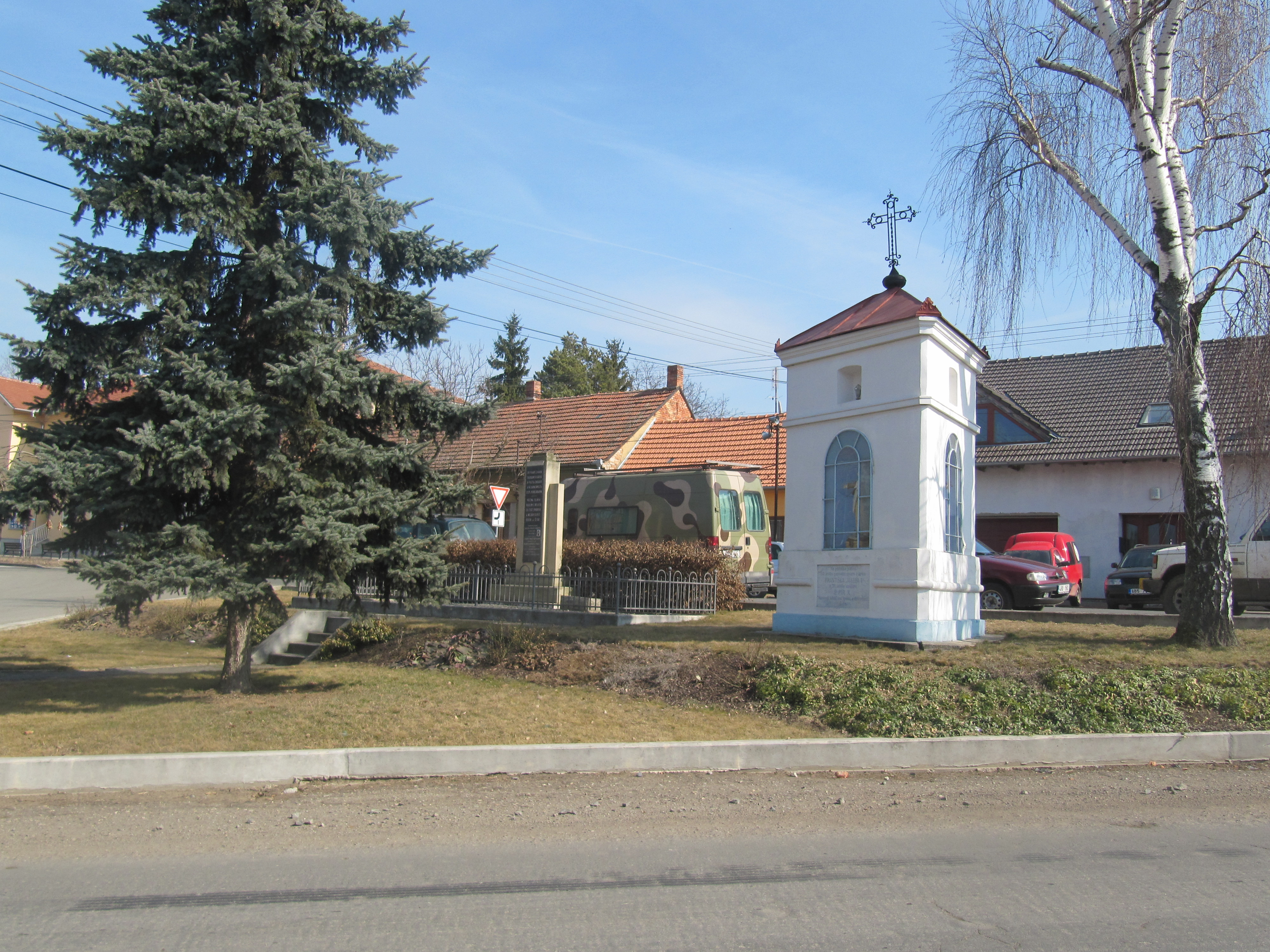
- Centre of Kobylnice

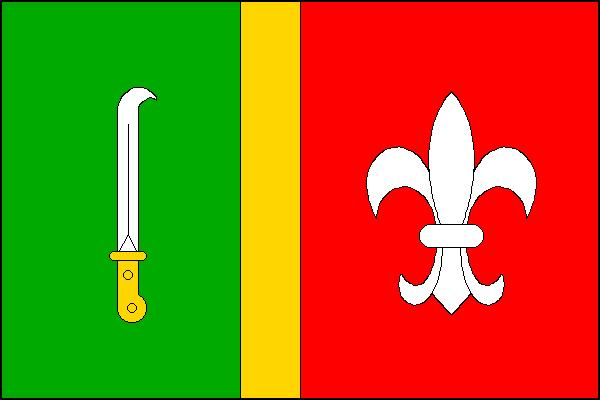
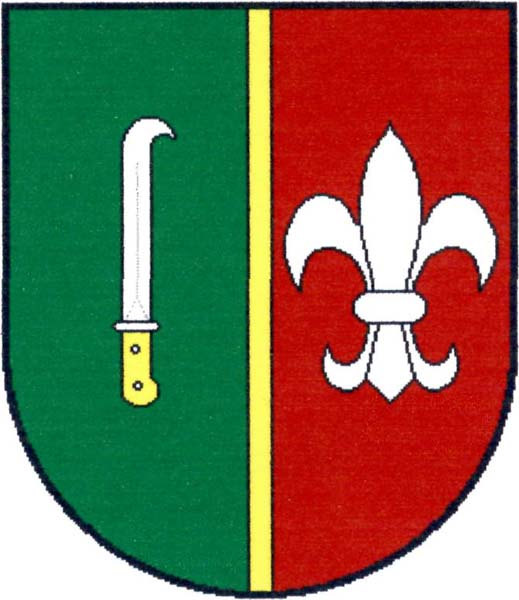
- Flag Coat of arms

- Location in the Czech Republic
- Coordinates: 49°8′17″N 16°43′55″E
- Country: Czech Republic
- Region: South Moravian
- District: Brno-Country
- First mentioned: 1306

Area
  - Total: 5.10 km^{2} (1.97 sq mi)
- Elevation: 214 m (702 ft)

Population (2026-01-01)
  - Total: 1,261
  - Density: 247/km^{2} (640/sq mi)
- Time zone: UTC+1 (CET)
  - Summer (DST): UTC+2 (CEST)
- Postal code: 664 51
- Website: www.kobylnice.cz

Kobylnice is a municipality and village in Brno-Country District in the South Moravian Region of the Czech Republic. It has about 1,300 inhabitants.

Kobylnice lies approximately 12 kilometres (7 mi) south-east of Brno and 198 km (123 mi) south-east of Prague.

== Demographics ==
Historical population
Year	Pop.	±%
1869	406	—
1880	514	+26.6%
1890	552	+7.4%
1900	569	+3.1%
1910	769	+35.1%
1921	843	+9.6%
1930	889	+5.5%
1950	845	−4.9%
1961	898	+6.3%
1970	931	+3.7%
1980	912	−2.0%
1991	848	−7.0%
2001	819	−3.4%
2011	996	+21.6%
2021	1,157	+16.2%
Source: Censuses
