= Nová Ves (Prague-East District) =

- Municipality
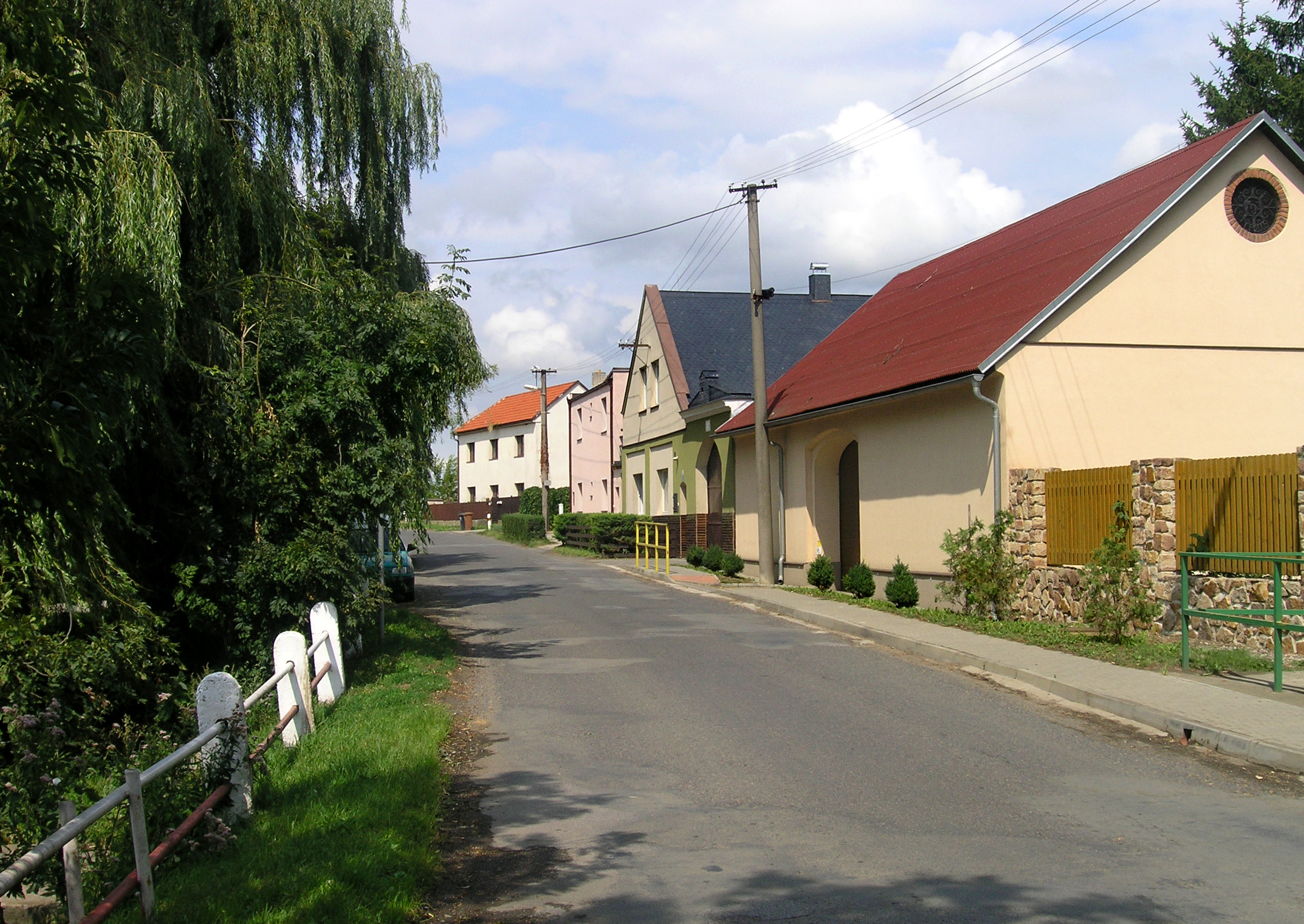
- Northern part of Nová Ves

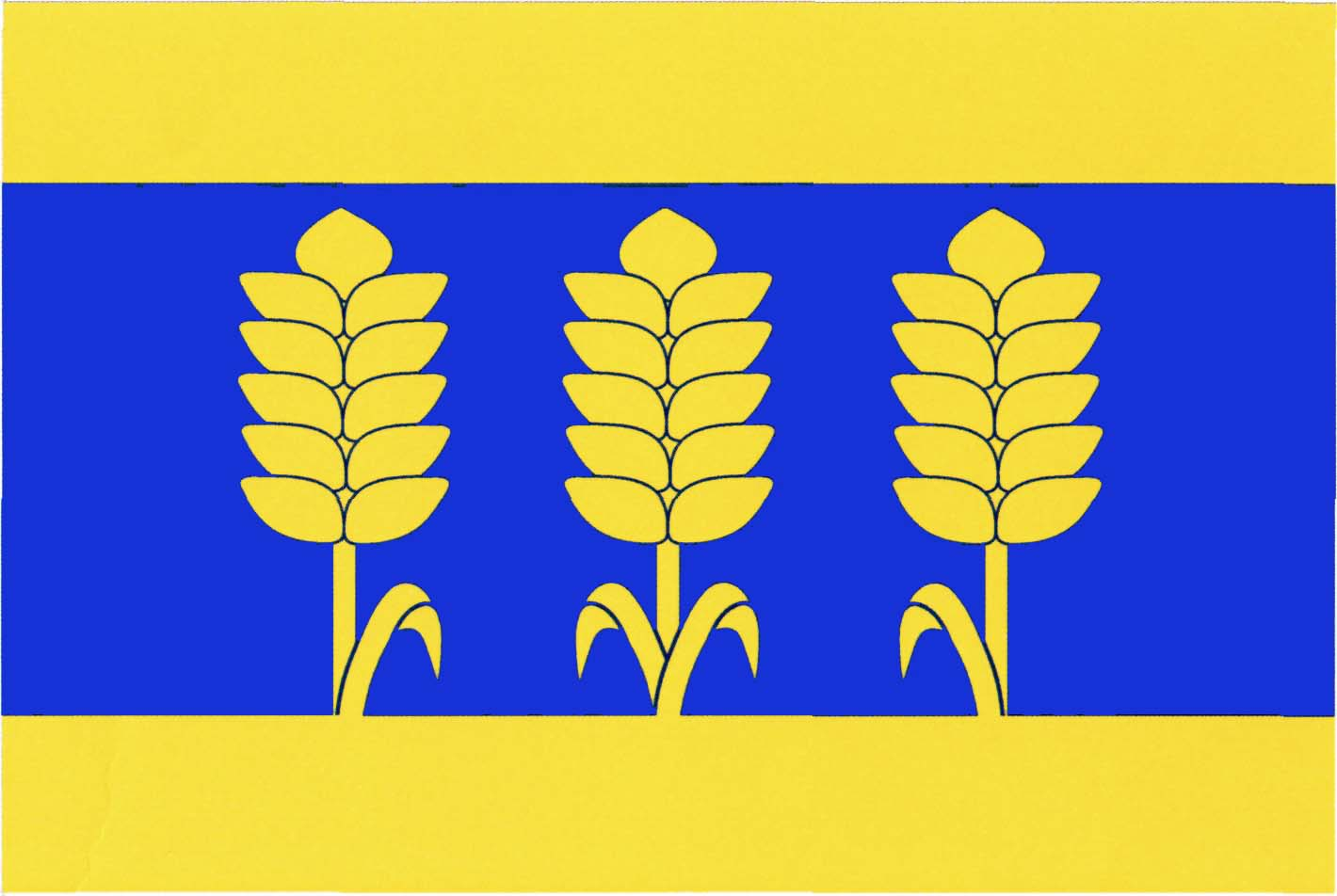
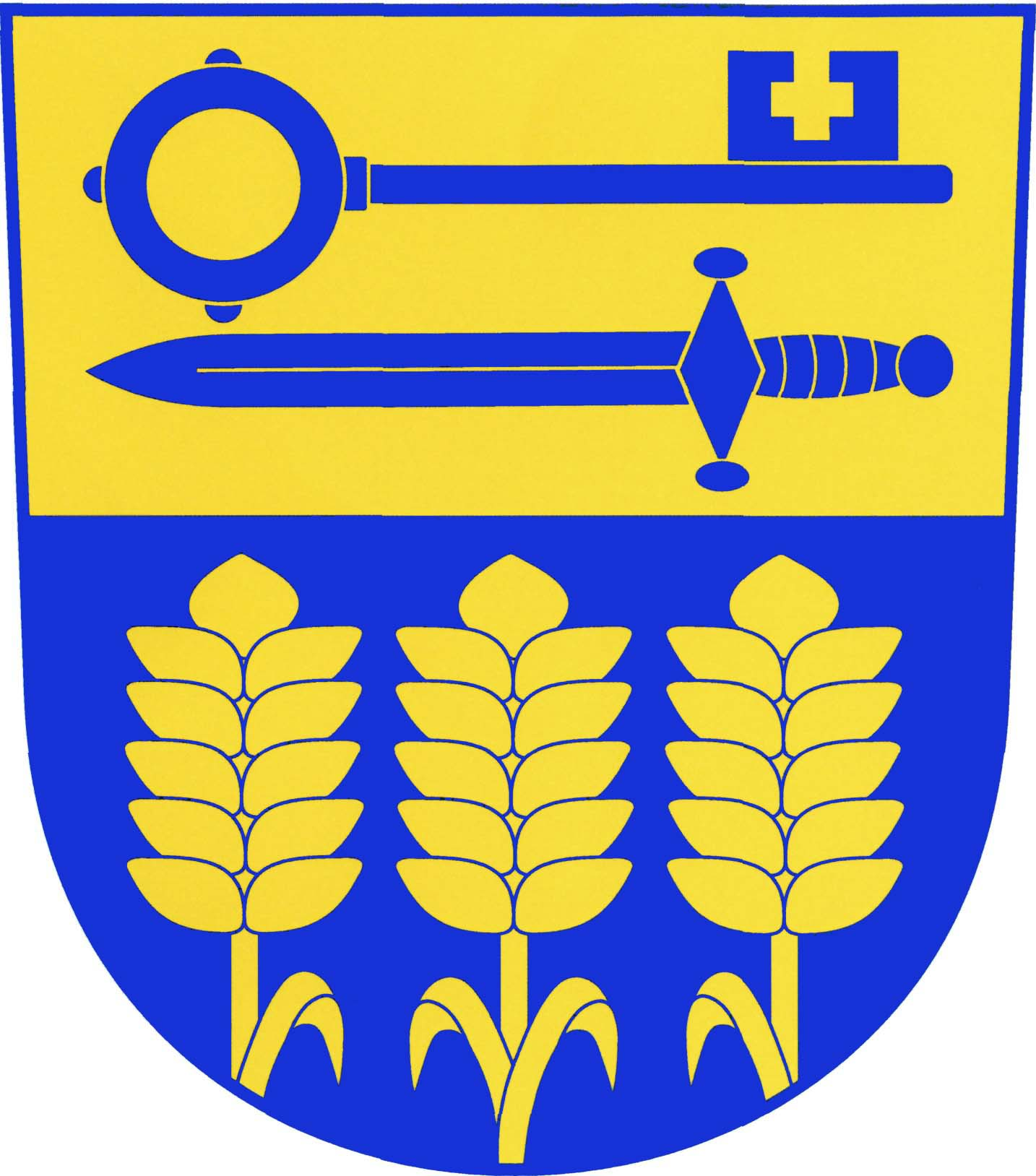
- Flag Coat of arms

- Location in the Czech Republic
- Coordinates: 50°13′9″N 14°32′9″E
- Country: Czech Republic
- Region: Central Bohemian
- District: Prague-East
- First mentioned: 1455

Area
  - Total: 1.95 km^{2} (0.75 sq mi)
- Elevation: 185 m (607 ft)

Population (2026-01-01)
  - Total: 1,578
  - Density: 809/km^{2} (2,100/sq mi)
- Time zone: UTC+1 (CET)
  - Summer (DST): UTC+2 (CEST)
- Postal codes: 250 01, 250 63
- Website: obec-novaves.cz

Nová Ves is a municipality and village in Prague-East District in the Central Bohemian Region of the Czech Republic. It has about 1,600 inhabitants.

== Etymology ==
The name means 'new village' in Czech.

== Geography ==
Nová Ves is located about 12 kilometres (7 mi) north of Prague. It lies in a flat agricultural landscape in the Central Elbe Table. The stream Zlonínský potok flows through the municipality.

== History ==
The first written mention of Nová Ves is from 1455. Between 1960 and 1990, it was a municipal part of Čakovičky. Since 1990, it has been again an independent municipality.

== Demographics ==
Historical population

Year	Pop.	±%
1869	193	—
1880	235	+21.8%
1890	206	−12.3%
1900	219	+6.3%
1910	237	+8.2%

Year	Pop.	±%
1921	241	+1.7%
1930	297	+23.2%
1950	183	−38.4%
1961	198	+8.2%
1970	188	−5.1%

Year	Pop.	±%
1980	237	+26.1%
1991	213	−10.1%
2001	226	+6.1%
2011	674	+198.2%
2021	1,517	+125.1%

Source: Censuses

== Transport ==
There are no railways or major roads passing through the municipality.

== Sights ==
There are no protected cultural monuments in the municipality.
