= Ponětovice =

- Municipality
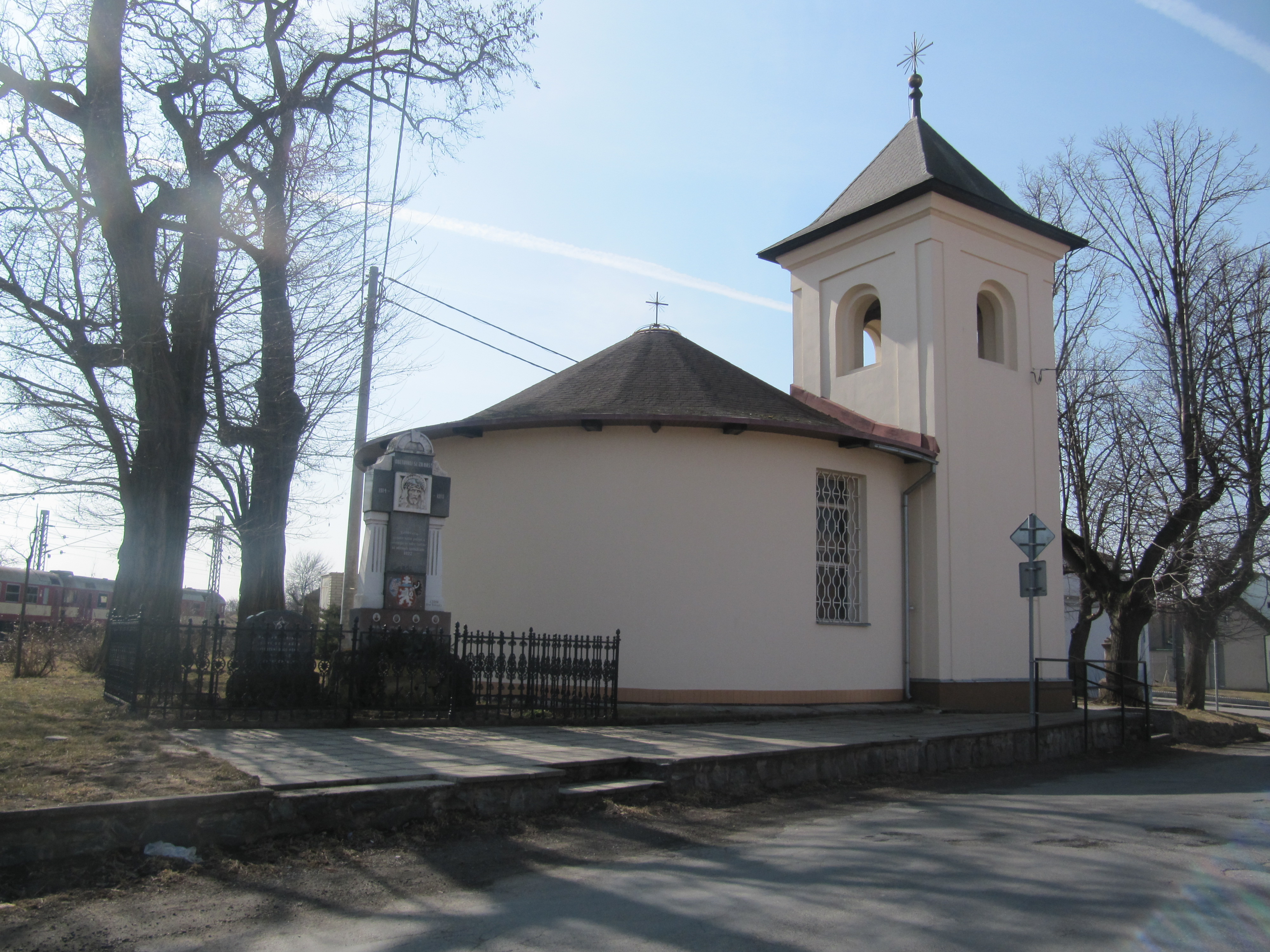
- Chapel of Saint John of Nepomuk

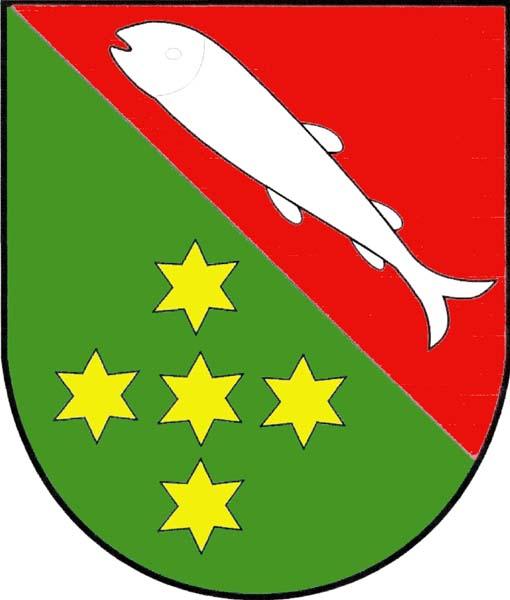
- Flag Coat of arms

- Location in the Czech Republic
- Coordinates: 49°9′8″N 16°44′32″E
- Country: Czech Republic
- Region: South Moravian
- District: Brno-Country
- First mentioned: 1306

Area
  - Total: 2.41 km^{2} (0.93 sq mi)
- Elevation: 220 m (720 ft)

Population (2026-01-01)
  - Total: 436
  - Density: 181/km^{2} (469/sq mi)
- Time zone: UTC+1 (CET)
  - Summer (DST): UTC+2 (CEST)
- Postal code: 664 51
- Website: www.ponetovice.eu

Ponětovice is a municipality and village in Brno-Country District in the South Moravian Region of the Czech Republic. It has about 400 inhabitants.

Ponětovice lies approximately 12 kilometres (7 mi) south-east of Brno and 198 km (123 mi) south-east of Prague.

== Demographics ==
Historical population
Year	Pop.	±%
1869	230	—
1880	265	+15.2%
1890	272	+2.6%
1900	303	+11.4%
1910	300	−1.0%
1921	343	+14.3%
1930	379	+10.5%
1950	351	−7.4%
1961	372	+6.0%
1970	363	−2.4%
1980	343	−5.5%
1991	313	−8.7%
2001	298	−4.8%
2011	377	+26.5%
2021	419	+11.1%
Source: Censuses
