= Holubice (Vyškov District) =

- Municipality
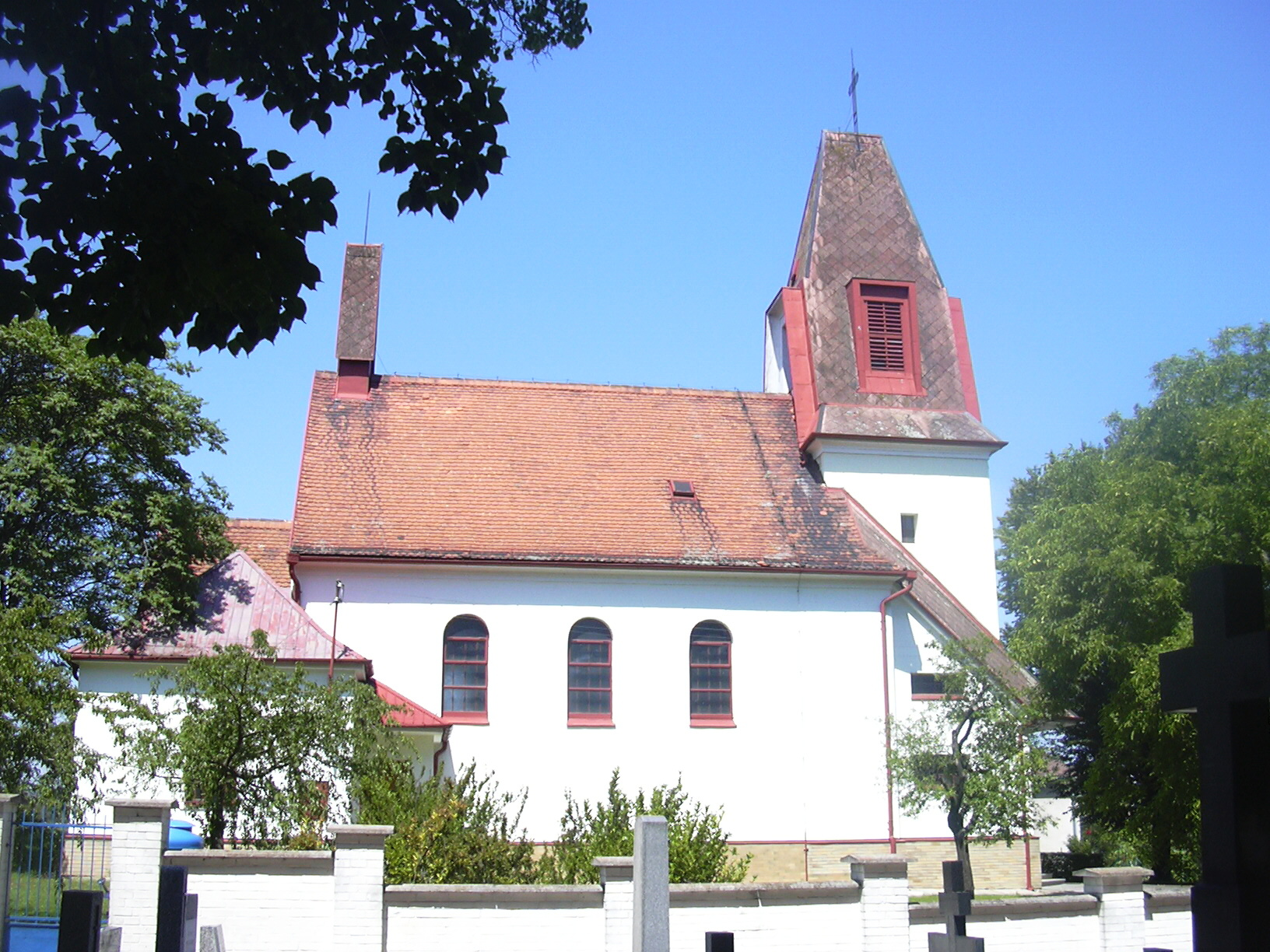
- Church of Saint Wenceslaus

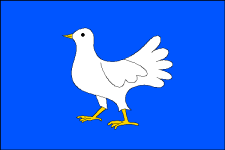
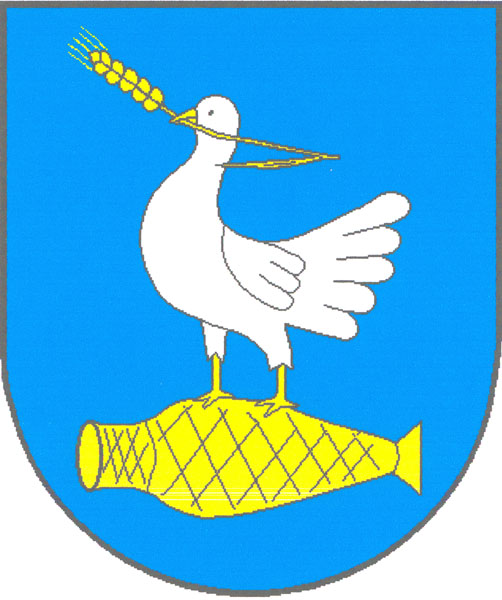
- Flag Coat of arms

- Location in the Czech Republic
- Coordinates: 49°10′39″N 16°48′44″E
- Country: Czech Republic
- Region: South Moravian
- District: Vyškov
- First mentioned: 1371

Area
  - Total: 7.39 km^{2} (2.85 sq mi)
- Elevation: 228 m (748 ft)

Population (2026-01-01)
  - Total: 1,929
  - Density: 261/km^{2} (676/sq mi)
- Time zone: UTC+1 (CET)
  - Summer (DST): UTC+2 (CEST)
- Postal code: 683 51
- Website: www.holubiceou.cz

Holubice is a municipality and village in Vyškov District in the South Moravian Region of the Czech Republic. It has about 1,900 inhabitants.

Holubice lies approximately 17 kilometres (11 mi) south-west of Vyškov, 15 km (9 mi) east of Brno, and 201 km (125 mi) south-east of Prague.

== Demographics ==
Historical population
Year	Pop.	±%
1869	583	—
1880	599	+2.7%
1890	685	+14.4%
1900	626	−8.6%
1910	732	+16.9%
1921	863	+17.9%
1930	961	+11.4%
1950	941	−2.1%
1961	979	+4.0%
1970	925	−5.5%
1980	921	−0.4%
1991	841	−8.7%
2001	848	+0.8%
2011	989	+16.6%
2021	1,533	+55.0%
Source: Censuses
