= Újezd (Olomouc District) =

- Municipality
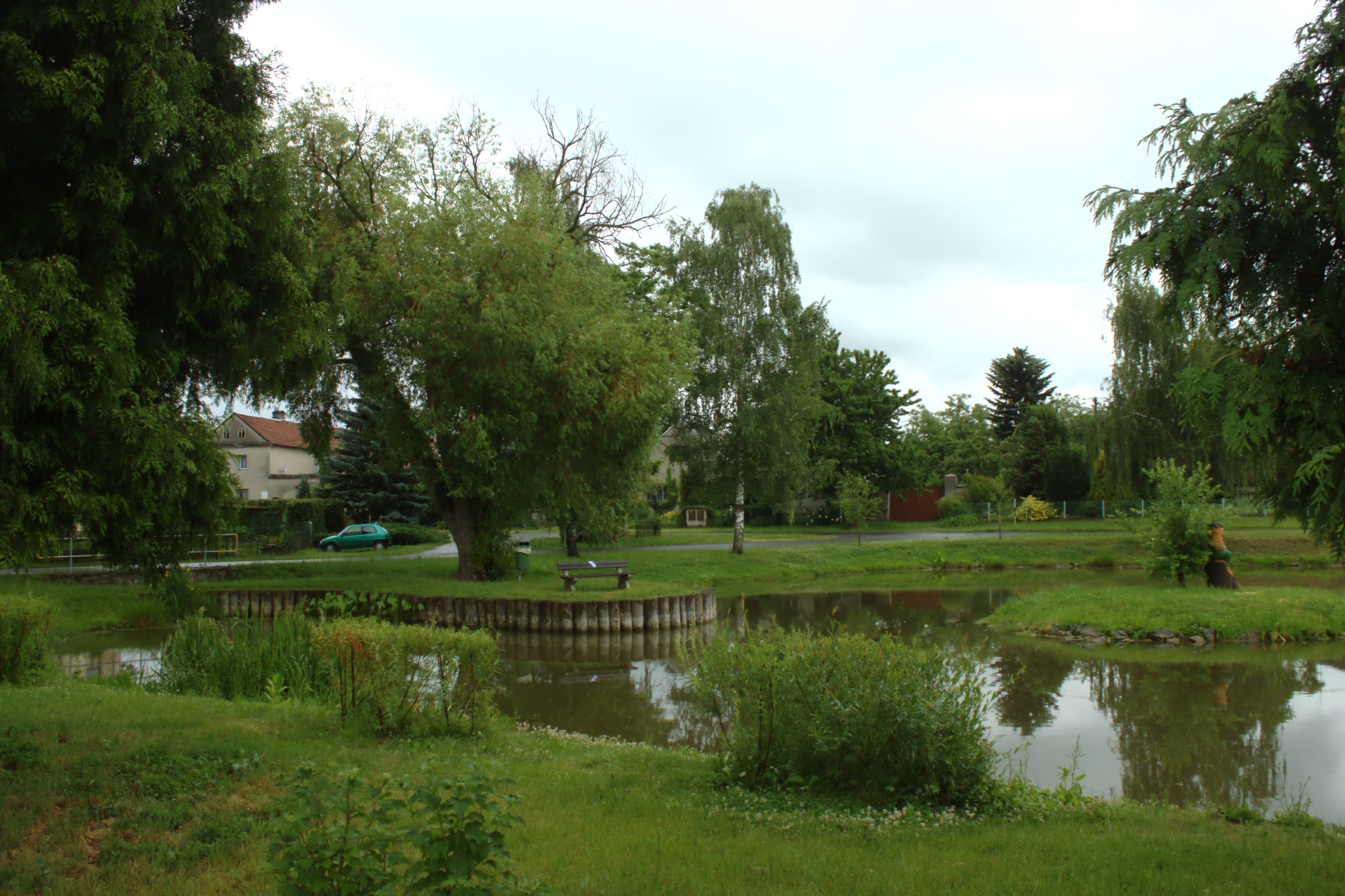
- A pond in the centre of Rybníček village

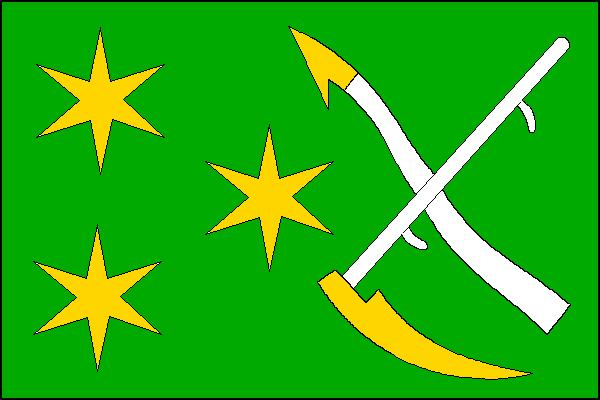
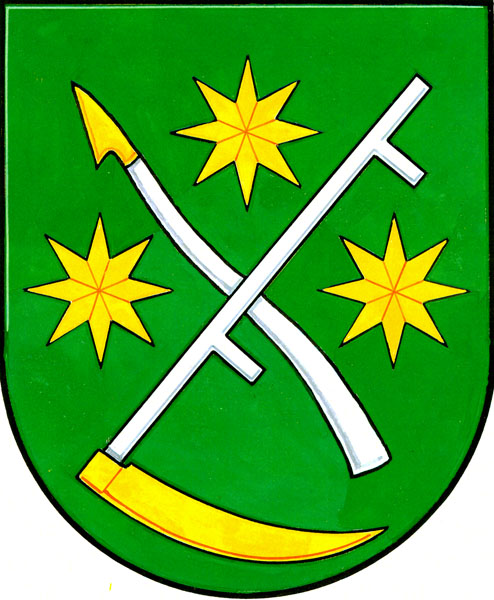
- Flag Coat of arms

- Location in the Czech Republic
- Coordinates: 49°45′50″N 17°10′50″E
- Country: Czech Republic
- Region: Olomouc
- District: Olomouc
- First mentioned: 1280

Area
  - Total: 18.59 km^{2} (7.18 sq mi)
- Elevation: 248 m (814 ft)

Population (2026-01-01)
  - Total: 1,509
  - Density: 81.17/km^{2} (210.2/sq mi)
- Time zone: UTC+1 (CET)
  - Summer (DST): UTC+2 (CEST)
- Postal code: 783 96
- Website: www.obec-ujezd.cz

Újezd is a municipality and village in Olomouc District in the Olomouc Region of the Czech Republic. It has about 1,500 inhabitants.

Újezd lies approximately 20 kilometres (12 mi) north of Olomouc and 201 km (125 mi) east of Prague.

== Administrative division ==
Újezd consists of three municipal parts (in brackets population according to the 2021 census):

- Újezd (1,053)
- Haukovice (128)
- Rybníček (223)

== Demographics ==
Historical population
Year	Pop.	±%
1869	2,096	—
1880	2,135	+1.9%
1890	2,143	+0.4%
1900	2,067	−3.5%
1910	1,927	−6.8%
1921	1,928	+0.1%
1930	1,872	−2.9%
1950	1,487	−20.6%
1961	1,506	+1.3%
1970	1,431	−5.0%
1980	1,390	−2.9%
1991	1,260	−9.4%
2001	1,334	+5.9%
2011	1,341	+0.5%
2021	1,404	+4.7%
Source: Censuses
