= Sivice =

- Municipality
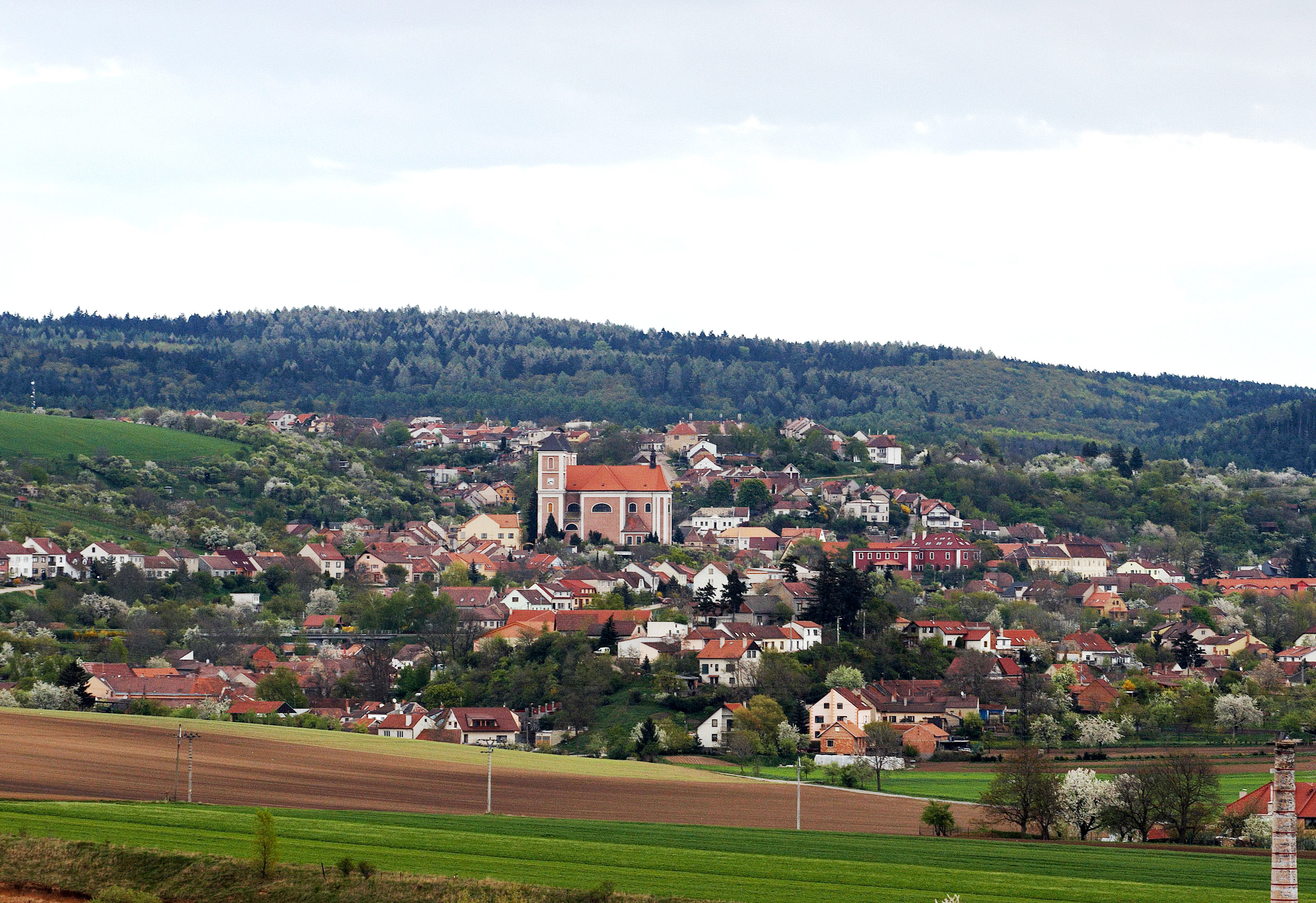
- View of Sivice with Pozořice in the background

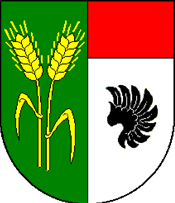
- Flag Coat of arms

- Location in the Czech Republic
- Coordinates: 49°12′13″N 16°46′57″E
- Country: Czech Republic
- Region: South Moravian
- District: Brno-Country
- First mentioned: 1317

Area
  - Total: 7.26 km^{2} (2.80 sq mi)
- Elevation: 278 m (912 ft)

Population (2026-01-01)
  - Total: 1,094
  - Density: 151/km^{2} (390/sq mi)
- Time zone: UTC+1 (CET)
  - Summer (DST): UTC+2 (CEST)
- Postal code: 664 07
- Website: www.sivice.cz

Sivice is a municipality and village in Brno-Country District in the South Moravian Region of the Czech Republic. It has about 1,100 inhabitants.

Sivice lies approximately 13 kilometres (8 mi) east of Brno and 197 km (122 mi) south-east of Prague.

== Demographics ==
Historical population
Year	Pop.	±%
1869	654	—
1880	731	+11.8%
1890	801	+9.6%
1900	791	−1.2%
1910	880	+11.3%
1921	845	−4.0%
1930	880	+4.1%
1950	942	+7.0%
1961	1,054	+11.9%
1970	991	−6.0%
1980	920	−7.2%
1991	891	−3.2%
2001	965	+8.3%
2011	1,008	+4.5%
2021	1,075	+6.6%
Source: Censuses
