= Josef Fanta =

Czech architect and designer (1856–1954)

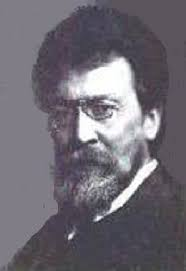
- Fanta in 1918
- Born: 7 December 1856; Sudoměřice u Tábora, Bohemia, Austrian Empire
- Died: 20 June 1954 (aged 97); Prague, Czechoslovakia
- Resting place: Olšany Cemetery, Prague
- Education: Czech Technical University in Prague

Josef Fanta (7 December 1856 – 20 June 1954) was a Czech architect and designer. He was a versatile artist with a wide range of interests. He is one of the most prominent representatives of Czech Art Nouveau architecture. In addition to his architectural and artistic activities, he was a university teacher from 1909 to 1922.

== Life ==
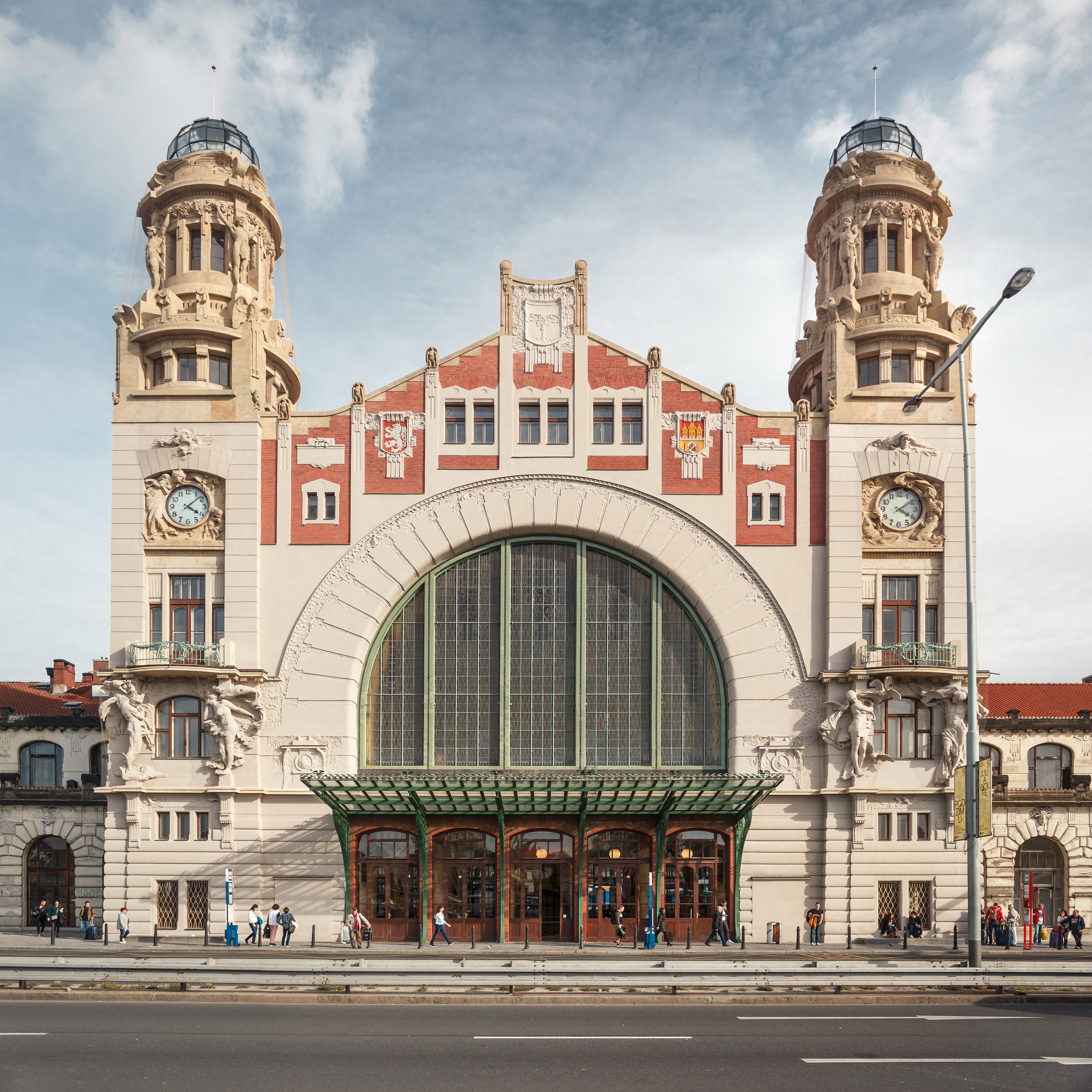
Front façade of the Praha hlavní nádraží railway station

Josef Fanta was born on 7 December 1856 in Sudoměřice u Tábora. He came from a deeply religious family, which was later reflected in his work. In 1873–1877, he studied civil engineering at the Czech Technical University in Prague (ČVUT). He then worked for Josef Zítek on the interiors of the National Theatre. From 1880, he was an assistant of Josef Schulz. In 1889–1890, he went on a study trip to Italy.

From 1909 to 1922, Fanta was a professor of medieval architecture at ČVUT. He educated many notable Czech architects. He was an honorary doctor of technical sciences and a member of the Czechoslovak Academy of Sciences. He was friends with the writers Julius Zeyer and Jakub Arbes and the painter Zdenka Braunerová.

In 1895, Fanta married the social worker Julie Kusá. He died on 20 June 1954 in Prague, at the age of 97. He is buried at the Olšany Cemetery, in the family tomb that he himself designed.

== Work ==
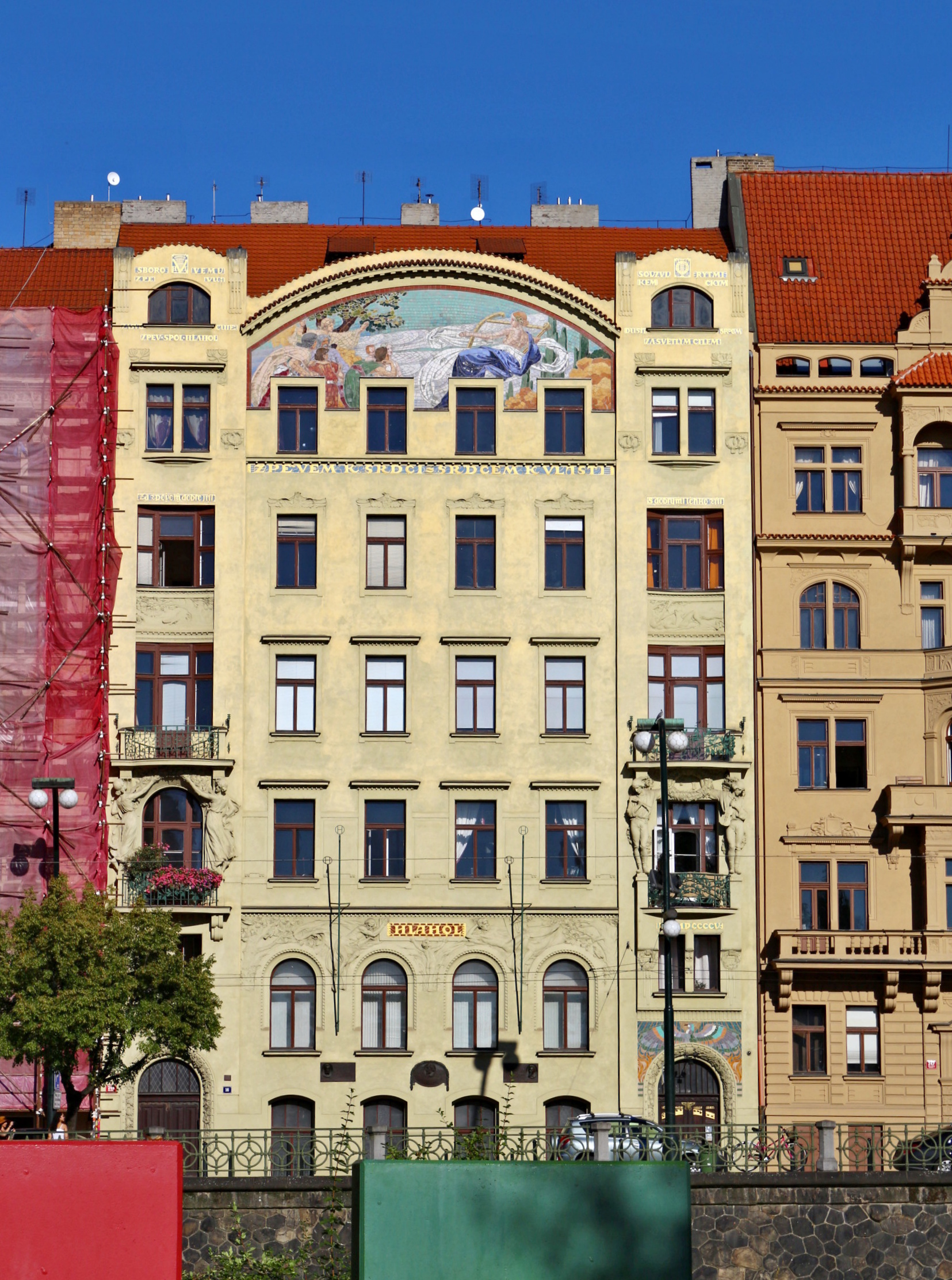
Hlahol House, an example of Fanta's Art Nouveau work

As an assistant to J. Schulz, Fanta participated in the interiors of the Rudolfinum and National Museum. His first major architectural achievement was a gold medal for the interiors of the pavilion of the Czech Chamber of Commerce and Trades at the 1900 Paris Exposition.

Fanta was among the representatives the Czech Neo-Renaissance, who developed into one of the most prominent representatives of Czech Art Nouveau architecture. He created many notable public architectural works including the railway station Praha hlavní nádraží (nicknamed "one of the final glories of the dying empire"), the Ondřejov Observatory, and the Cairn of Peace Memorial in Prace, which commemorates the Battle of Austerlitz. He was known for designing family homes and villas, each of which was unique. His last big work was the Ministry of Trade building in Prague (1925–1932).

Fanta is known primarily as an architect, but he was a versatile artist. He designed both complete buildings and interiors, was a designer of products made of wood, ceramics, metal and textiles, was a painter who designed frescoes and sgraffiti, and organiser of artistic events. His religious background led to the design of altars, tombstones and other religious objects, and reconstructing sacral monuments. He created many paintings during his stay in Italy. He is also the author of the publication O svérázu krojovém a bytovém ('About the uniqueness of clothing and housing').

=== Selected works ===
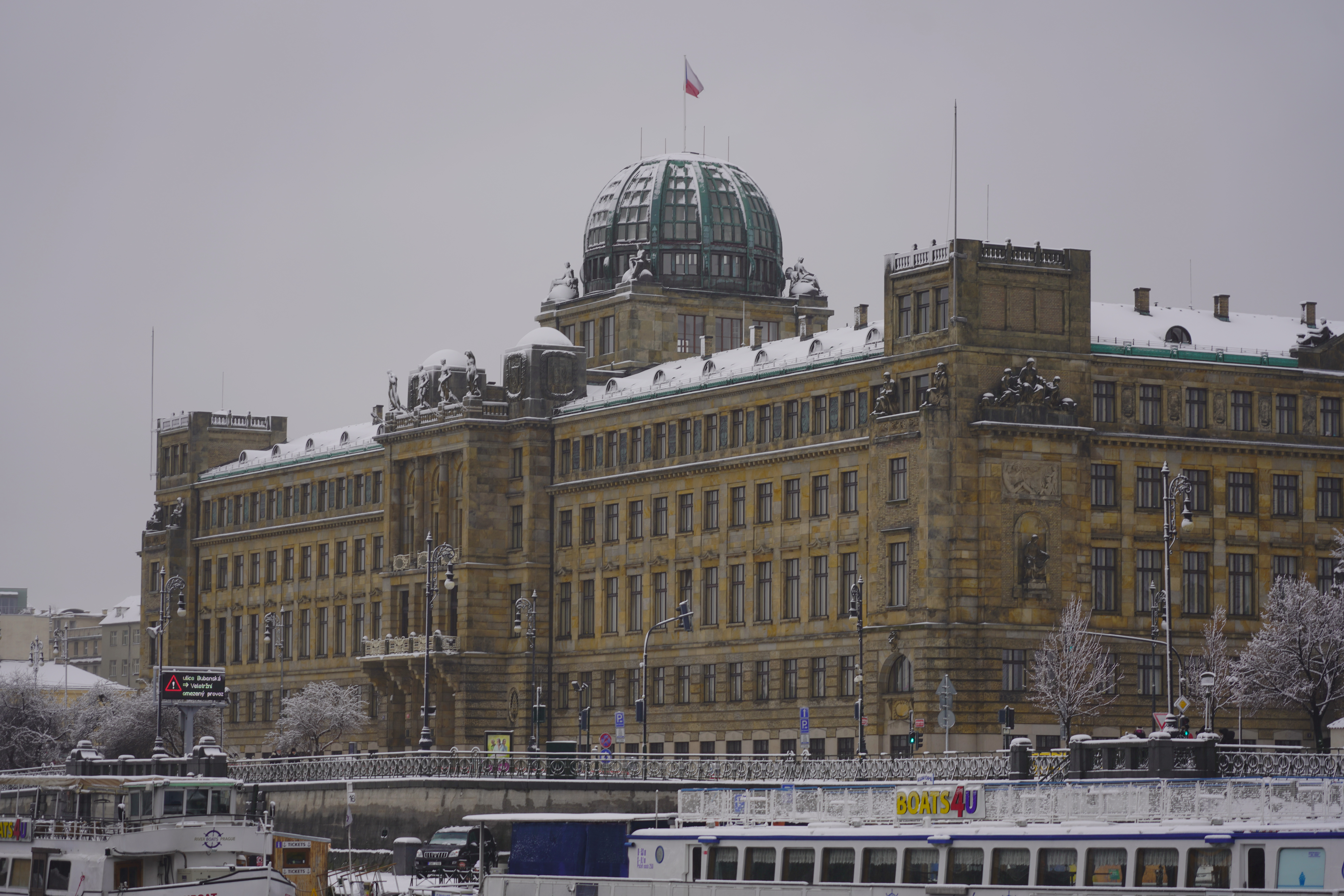
Ministry of Industry and Trade in Prague

- Obereigner Villa, Poděbrady (1897)
- Church of the Nativity of the Virgin Mary, Klatovy (1898–1908) – reconstruction
- Praha hlavní nádraží railway station, Prague (1901–1909)
- Hlahol House, Prague (1903–1905)
- Cemetery with the cemetery chapel, Poděbrady (1903–1907)
- Church of Saint Wenceslaus at Zderaz, Prague (1904) – reconstruction
- Hlávka's College, Prague (1904–1905)
- Church of Saint John of Nepomuk, Rožmitál pod Třemšínem (1904–1905) – reconstruction
- Ondřejov Observatory, Ondřejov (1905)
- Bohumil Hobzek Villa, Hradec Králové (1909–1910)
- Kouřimka Villa, Poděbrady (1910)
- Cairn of Peace Memorial, Prace (1910–1912)
- Town hall, Klatovy (c. 1925)
- Ministry of Industry and Trade, Prague (1925–1932)
