= Žuráň =

Hill in the Czech Republic

Coordinates: 49.1797°N 16.7388°E

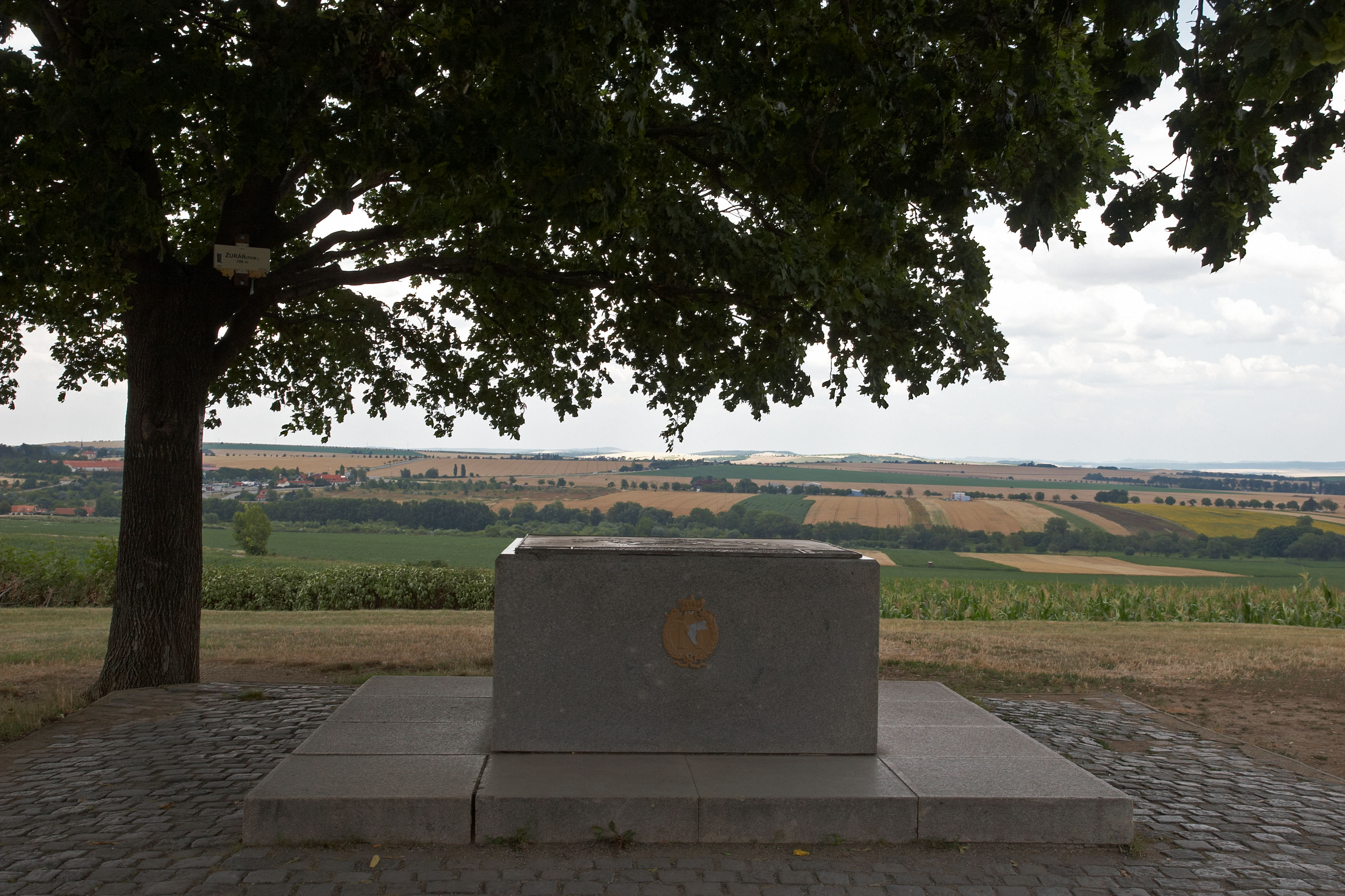
Peak of Žuráň

Žuráň is a small hill (286 metres) near the village of Podolí in the Czech Republic.

Žuráň is a site of considerable archaeological importance, since it features a tumulus in which lie buried members of the ancient Germanic high aristocracy of Moravia (probably from 5th and 6th century). It has been declared a cultural monument. According to historian Josef Poulík king Wacho was buried there, but later historians are not certain about the identities of the people buried there.

The hill is also famous because on 2 December 1805 Napoleon Bonaparte led his battle of Austerlitz from its peak. Therefore, the peak of Žuráň was proclaimed to be extraterritoriality French. The hill is known in France as The Emperor's Hill or Height and Napoleon's Table. At the peak of the hill there is a small memorial dedicated to the battle (with a map of battlefield) and also the flags of all nations which fought in the battle.

== See also ==
- Cairn of Peace Memorial
