= Cairn of Peace Memorial =

Peace Memorial in the Czech Republic

Coordinates: 49°7′41″N 16°45′45″E

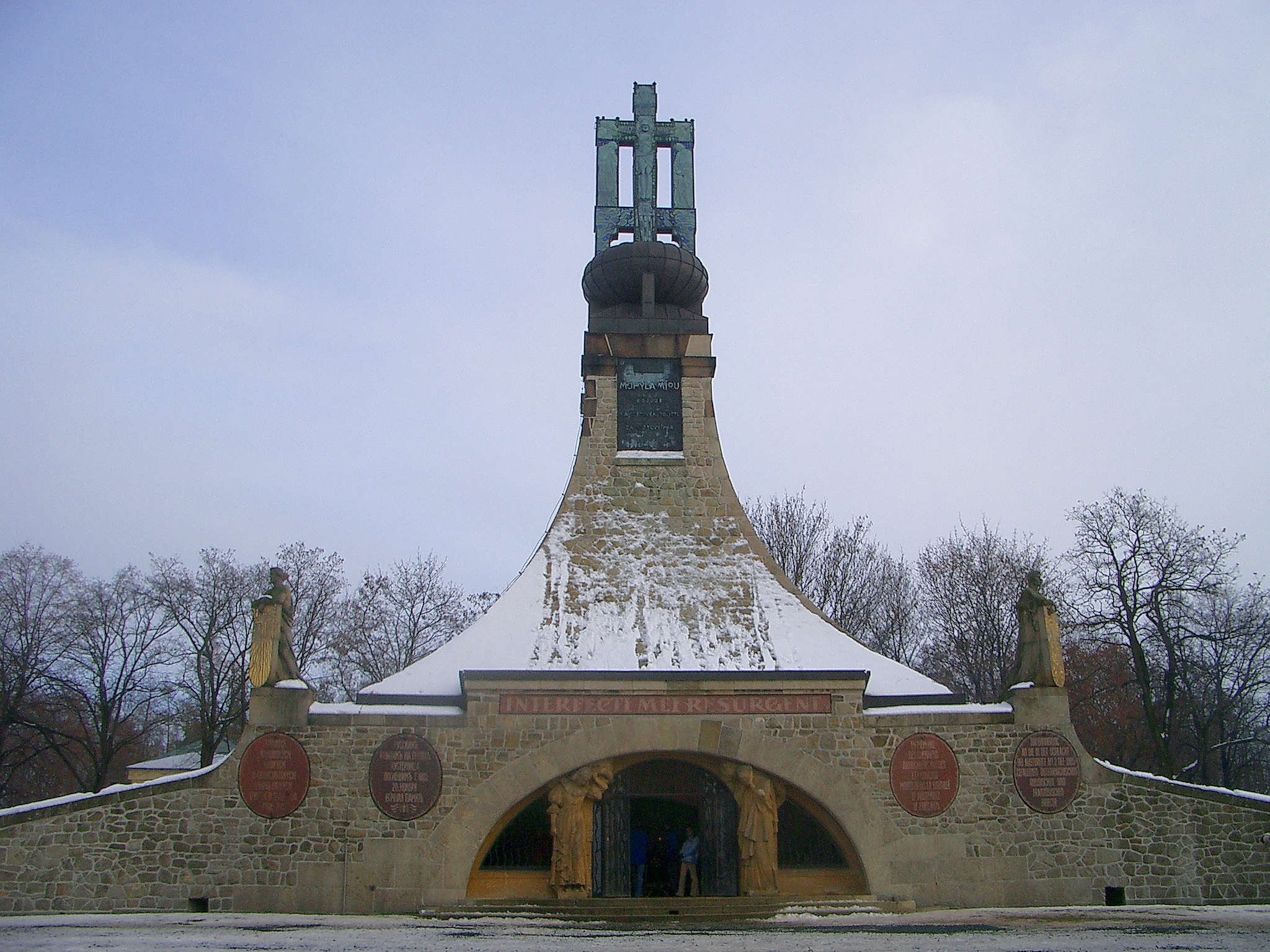
Cairn of Peace

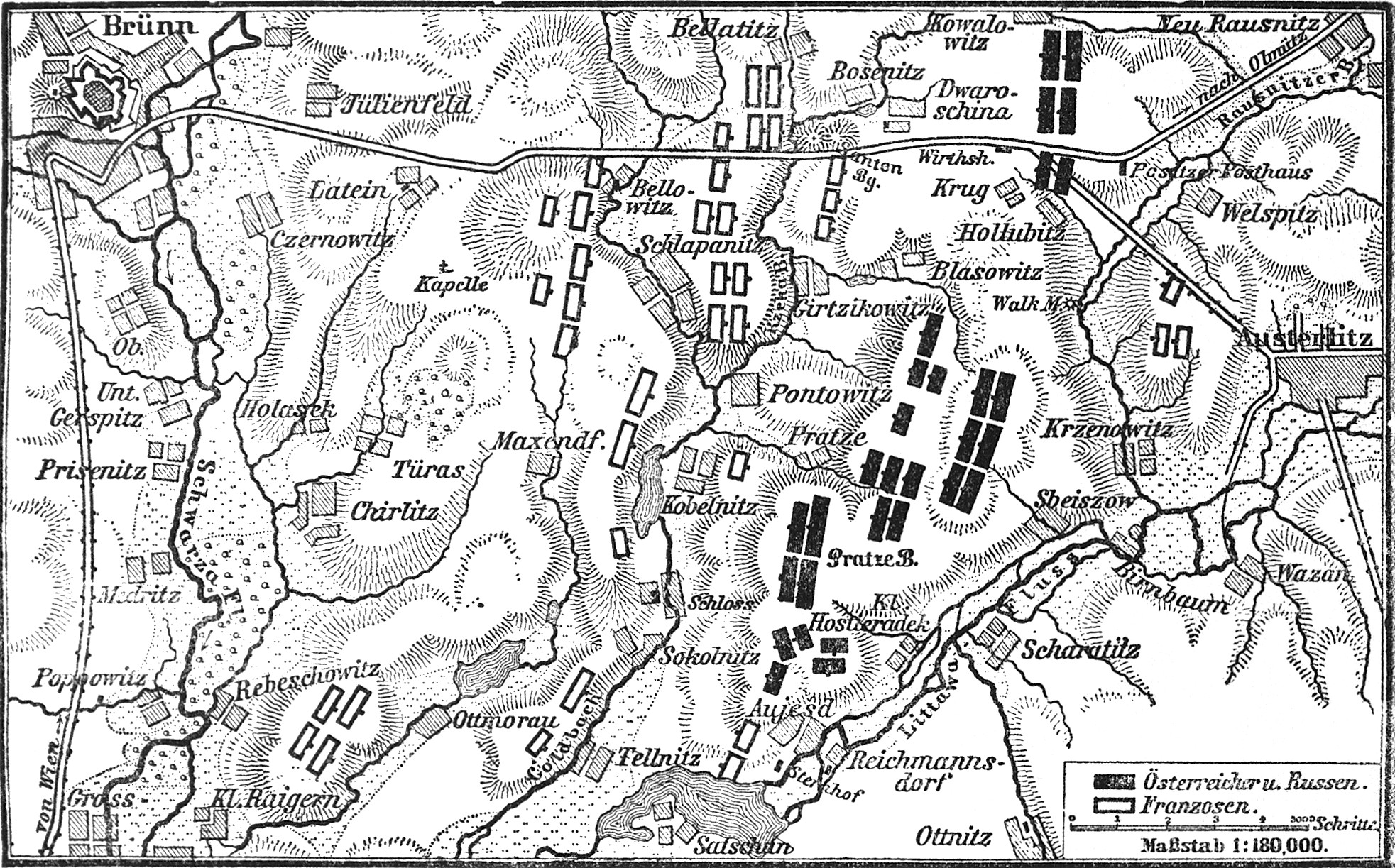
A sketch of the beginning of the battle. "Pratz B" marks the concentration of the allied troops on the Prace Hill

The Cairn of Peace Memorial (Czech: Mohyla míru, 'Mound of Peace') is the memorial to the fallen in the Battle of Austerlitz, the first peace memorial in Europe. It is located by the village of Prace, Czech Republic on the Prace Hill, one of the key points of the battle.

It was designed by Josef Fanta in 1910–1912. World War I postponed the monument's dedication until 1923. monument is 26 m (85 ft) high, square, with four female statues symbolizing France, Austria, Russia and Moravia. Within is a chapel with an ossuary. Near the monument there is a branch of the Brno Museum with a permanent multimedia exhibition dedicated to the battle, as well as temporary exhibitions.

== See also ==
- Žuráň, another memorial place related to the battle nearby
