= Sudoměřice u Tábora =

- Municipality
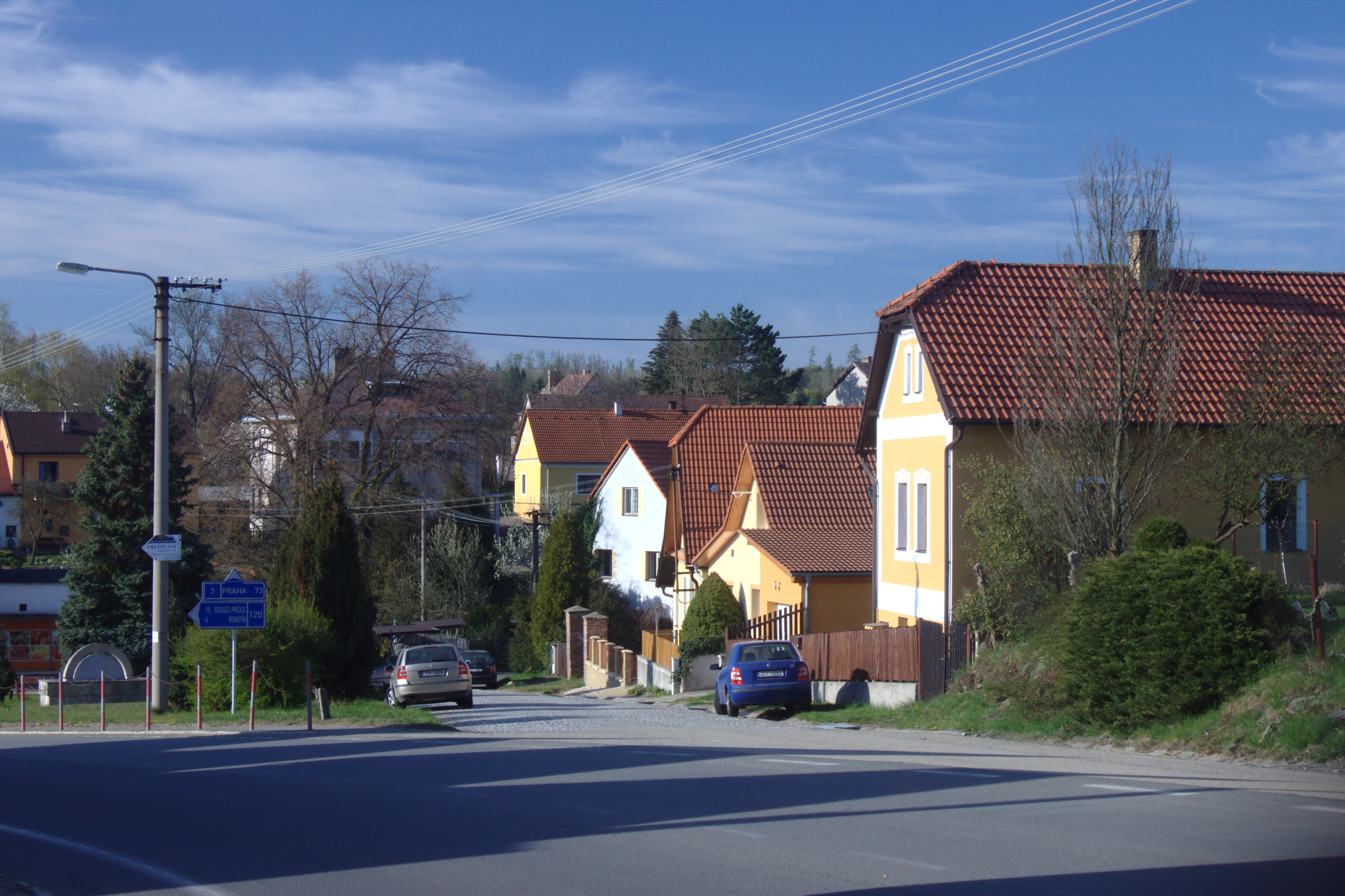
- Centre of Sudoměřice u Tábora

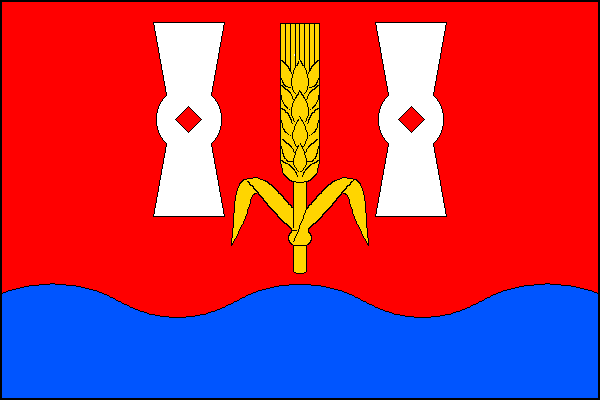
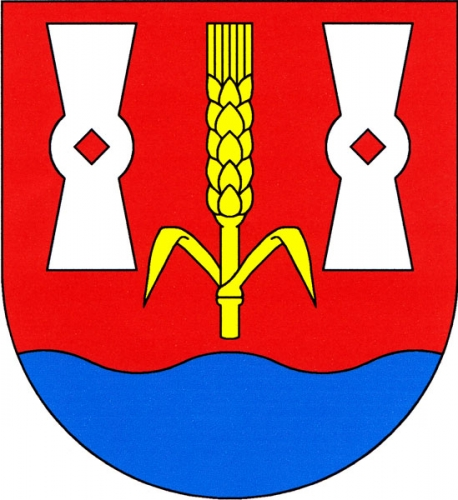
- Flag Coat of arms

- Location in the Czech Republic
- Coordinates: 49°30′37″N 14°39′31″E
- Country: Czech Republic
- Region: South Bohemian
- District: Tábor
- First mentioned: 1318

Area
  - Total: 3.42 km^{2} (1.32 sq mi)
- Elevation: 525 m (1,722 ft)

Population (2026-01-01)
  - Total: 335
  - Density: 98.0/km^{2} (254/sq mi)
- Time zone: UTC+1 (CET)
  - Summer (DST): UTC+2 (CEST)
- Postal code: 391 36
- Website: www.sudomericeutabora.cz

Sudoměřice u Tábora is a municipality and village in Tábor District in the South Bohemian Region of the Czech Republic. It has about 300 inhabitants.

Sudoměřice u Tábora lies approximately 11 kilometres (7 mi) north of Tábor, 61 km (38 mi) north of České Budějovice, and 67 km (42 mi) south of Prague.

== Demographics ==
Historical population
| Year | Pop. | ±% |
|---|---|---|
| 1869 | 394 | — |
| 1880 | 281 | −28.7% |
| 1890 | 273 | −2.8% |
| 1900 | 237 | −13.2% |
| 1910 | 305 | +28.7% |
| 1921 | 279 | −8.5% |
| 1930 | 351 | +25.8% |
| 1950 | 331 | −5.7% |
| 1961 | 436 | +31.7% |
| 1970 | 382 | −12.4% |
| 1980 | 332 | −13.1% |
| 1991 | 308 | −7.2% |
| 2001 | 275 | −10.7% |
| 2011 | 312 | +13.5% |
| 2021 | 305 | −2.2% |
Source: Censuses

== Notable people ==
- Josef Fanta (1856–1954), architect and designer
