= St. Wenceslas Church (Zderaz) =

Coordinates: 50.0753°N 14.4158°E

Church of St Wenceslas in Zderaz
- Czech: Kostel svatého Václava na Zderaze
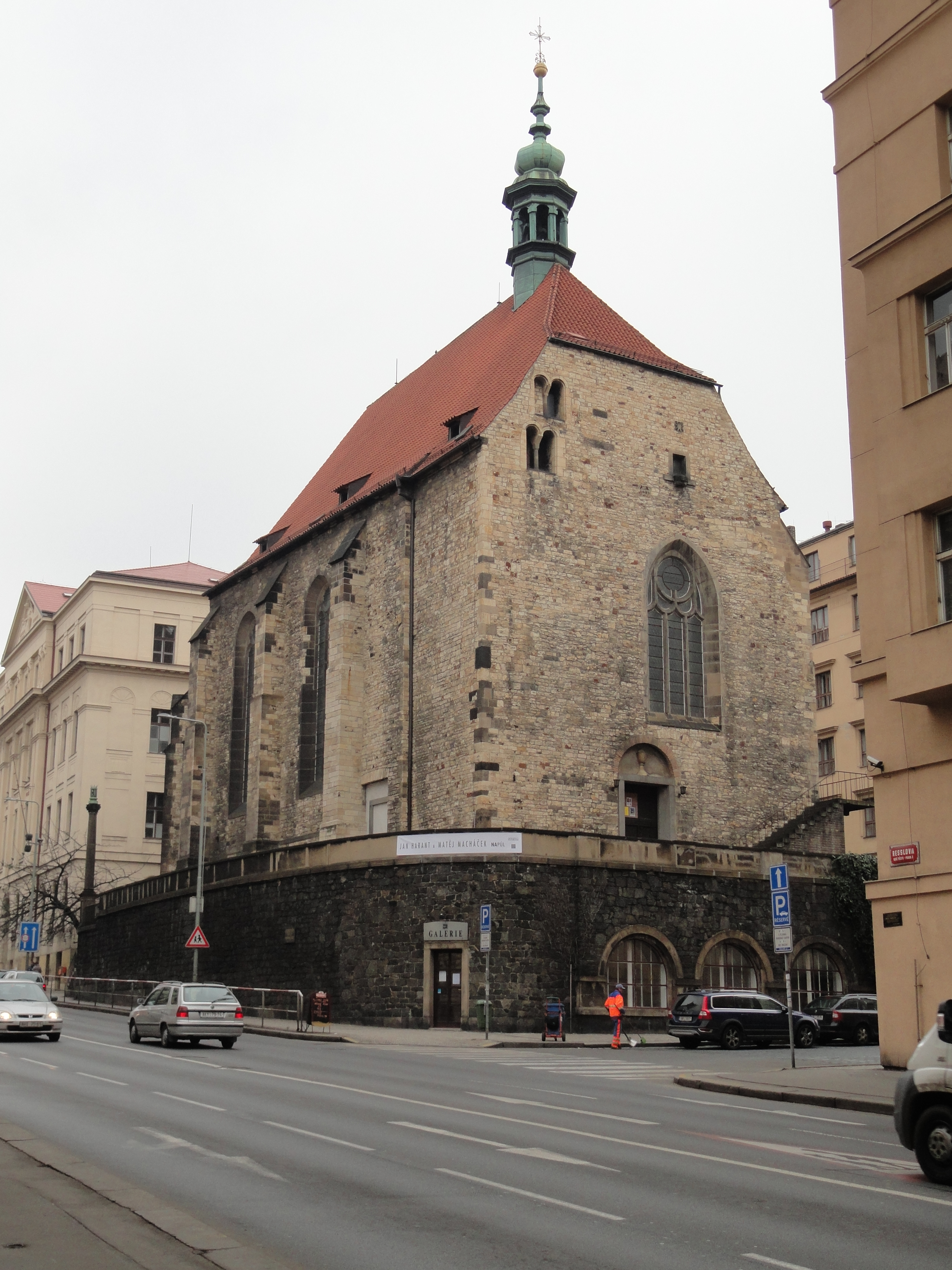
- St. Wenceslas' Church at Zderaz as seen from Resslova Street.
- Church of St Wenceslas in Zderaz
- Location: Zderaz, New Town, Prague
- Country: Czechia
- Denomination: Hussite Church
- Previous denomination: Catholic Church

History
- Status: Parish church
- Dedication: Wenceslaus
- Consecrated: 26 November 1181

Architecture
- Functional status: Active
- Heritage designation: Czech cultural monument
- Architectural type: Hall church
- Style: Gothic
- Years built: 12th century

National Cultural Monument of the Czech Republic
- Official name: Kostel sv. Václava Na Zderaze
- Reference no.: 1000152154

St. Wenceslas Church at Zderaz (Czech: Kostel svatého Václava na Zderaze) is a Gothic single-nave church in Prague – New Town. It is located at the crossroad of Resslova Street and Dittrichova Street.

== History ==
=== Origins ===
The Zderaz settlement has ancient origin and is named after the owner, Zderaz. In 1115, the village was first mentioned with a church, which was probably dedicated to Saints Peter and Paul.

In the years 1180 to 1190, the settlement belonged to two Czech noblemen, Kojat and Všebor (Svébor), members of the aristocratic House of Hrabischitz, who gave their land to found a monastery of the Order of the Cross – the Guardians of the Holy Sepulchre. However, due to this, the villagers lost their parish church, therefore the brothers founded a new Romanesque church dedicated to Saint Wenceslaus. The new church took over the parish duties of the Church of St. Peter and Paul. St. Wenceslas' Church at Zderaz was consecrated 26 November 1181 by the Bishop Valentine of Prague.

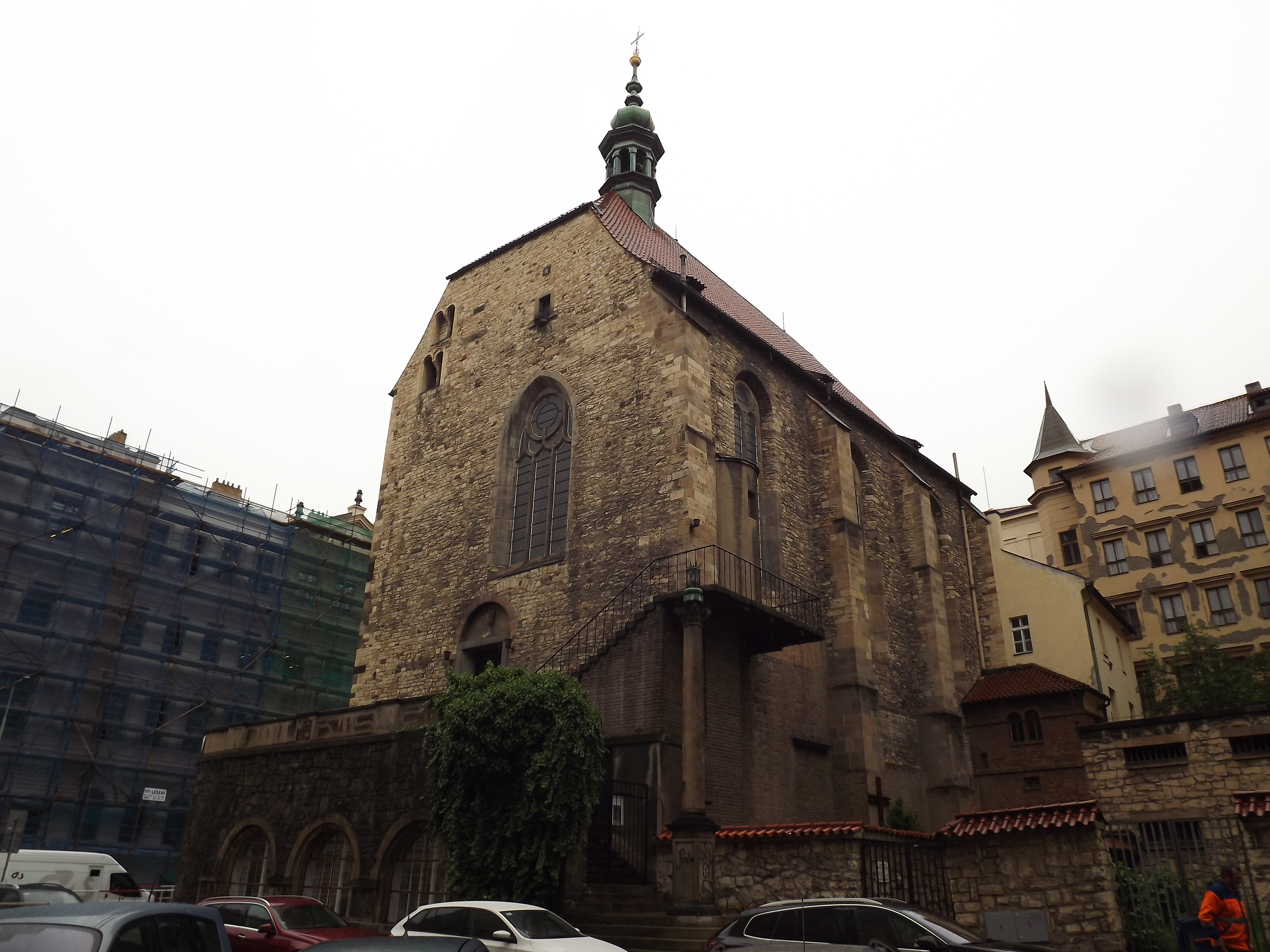
St. Wenceslas Church at Zderaz from Dittrichova Street

Archaeological research made by archaeologist Karel Guth (1883–1943) in the years 1927–1929, showed that it was a simple one-nave construction with a semi rounded apse on the east and a large square tower on the west. A part of this tower was later included into the Gothic reconstruction and it became a part of the western frontage of the church from 14th century. The church was surrounded by a cemetery. Three gravestones were preserved and are now placed in the City of Prague Museum.

=== 14th century ===
In 1324, the monastery bought a house with a spa near the church and established a hospital in this new building. After the founding of New Town in 1348 by king Charles IV, St. Wenceslas Church became one of the New Town parish churches.

The visitation protocols of the Archdeacon of Prague Paul of Janovice from 1379-1382 state that the church had four altars. There was already a vaulted choir with a two bays of cross vault and a pentagonal ending. The sacristy was built on the south side of choir. The nave remained without a vault, it probably had a wooden ceiling, supported by two pillars. As stated before, the tower of the Romanesque church was included as a part of the Gothic nave.

=== The Hussite Wars ===
On 5 August 1420, the monastery was burned down by the Hussites and St. Wenceslas Church was given to Hussite priests, together with the parsonage. After the Hussite Wars, the church was restored. Two altars were added next to the pillars, which supported the ceiling, one was dedicated to Saints Nicholas and Procopius, the other to St. John the Baptist. Around 1500, a Gothic arch was added as a decoration to the main altar. The arch was transferred to the parish Church of St. Adalbert in Jílové near Prague in 1760.

=== 16th–17th centuries ===
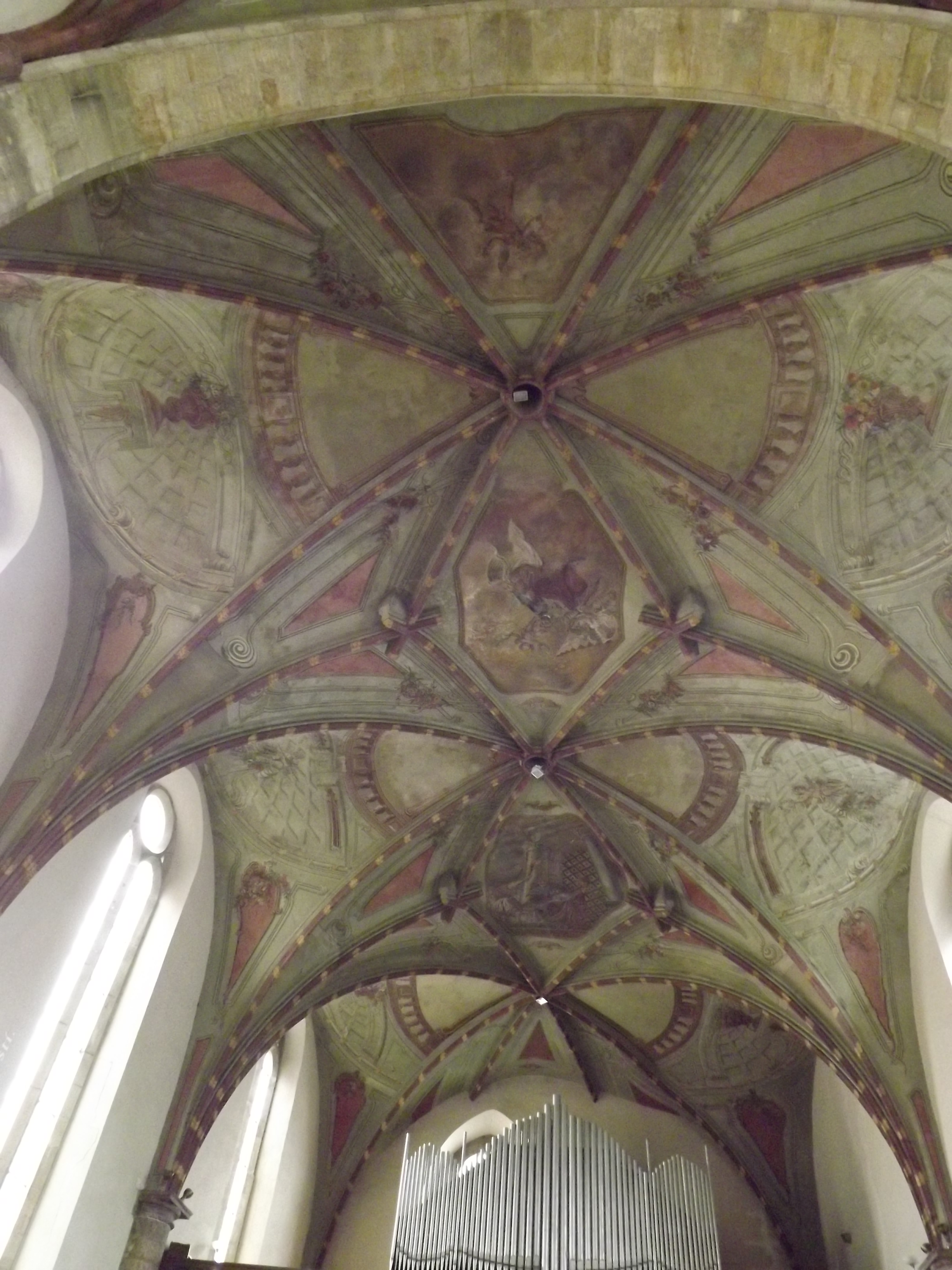
The Gothic vault over the nave

Until 1586, the church remained without a change, afterwards Emperor Rudolf II donated 300 threescopes to the church. The wooden ceiling was replaced with a new Gothic vault with terracotta ribs supported by Tuscan semi columns. Due to this change, the Gothic windows had to be lowered down and their traceries had to be replaced, even the Romanesque tower was demolished. The reconstruction was led by master builder Karel Mělnický.

In 1641, a cloister was built for the newcomer community of Augustinians. Before that, in 1623, the church was given to the Augustinians by emperor Ferdinand II. Three years later, with the support of the emperor and nobility, the Augustinians started to build a monastery on the west side of the church. Around 1645, the church was paved with white marble and green serpentine, brought from the Prague Castle, together with four marble pillars. The construction was finished a year later.

During the Swedish occupation of Prague, the church was heavily damaged. In 17th century, a new sacristy was built on the place of the old one. The most famous Czech Baroque painter Karel Škréta painted 32 paintings depicting the Legend of St. Wenceslas for the cloister of the church. The monastery and the church became a gallery of Škréta's paintings for the Augustinians. There were often held funerals of important people.

=== 18th–19th centuries ===
In the year 1785, the monastery was abolished and deconsecrated. This was due to the emperor Joseph II, who abolished many monasteries during his reign. From 1809, the building became a prison. In 1827, the church was consecrated again, however it still remained a prison until 1884, when the jail was moved to Pankrác and the complex of buildings was bought by the city.

=== Reconstruction in the 20th century ===
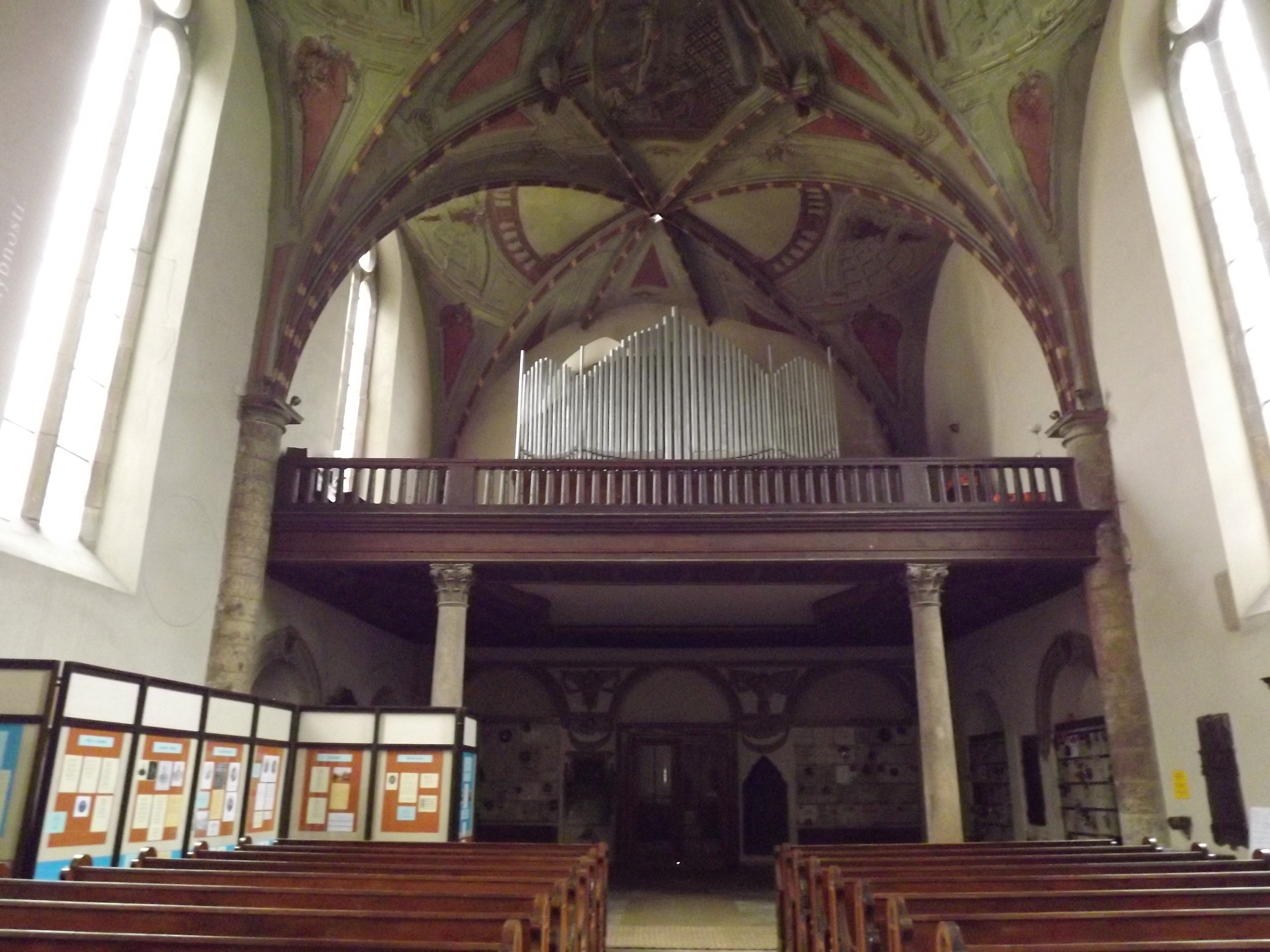
The choir

Around 1904, the whole monastery was demolished and the terrain was lowered to the level of the street and rent houses were built instead of the monastery. The church was not restored and was in danger of demolition.

However, in 1904, the Association for restoration of St. Wenceslas Church ordered a plan for restoration, which was made by acknowledged Art Nouveau architects Antonín Wiehl and Josef Fanta. The cemetery was abolished but the church was still not restored. In 1909, the city council appointed architects Eduard Sochor and Ferdinand Čapka with the restoration. A terrace was created around the church, the tracery was restored, nevertheless the renovation works stopped one year later. They were not finished till the church was bought by The Czechoslovak Hussite Church. In 1926 the reconstruction was finally completed. The temple was consecrated again in 1929. In 1936, a columbarium was added under the choir loft.

== Architecture ==
=== Exterior ===
St. Wenceslas Church is located on a rock terrace above the level of street. The construction is made of rubble stone with remains of Romanesque walls. The building includes a polyhedral chancel, a rectangular nave, a fléche and a Baroque sacristy in the south. The main nave is 14 meters high, the smaller presbytery is 13 meters high with the ending shaped as five sides of an octagon.

The pointed windows have new simple Renaissance traceries, made from the remains of old ones. The main nave is supported by four simple columns in the south and three on the north. The oldest part of the construction are the remains of the Romanesque tower in the north-west. There is a gallery located under the church.

=== Interior ===
==== Vault ====
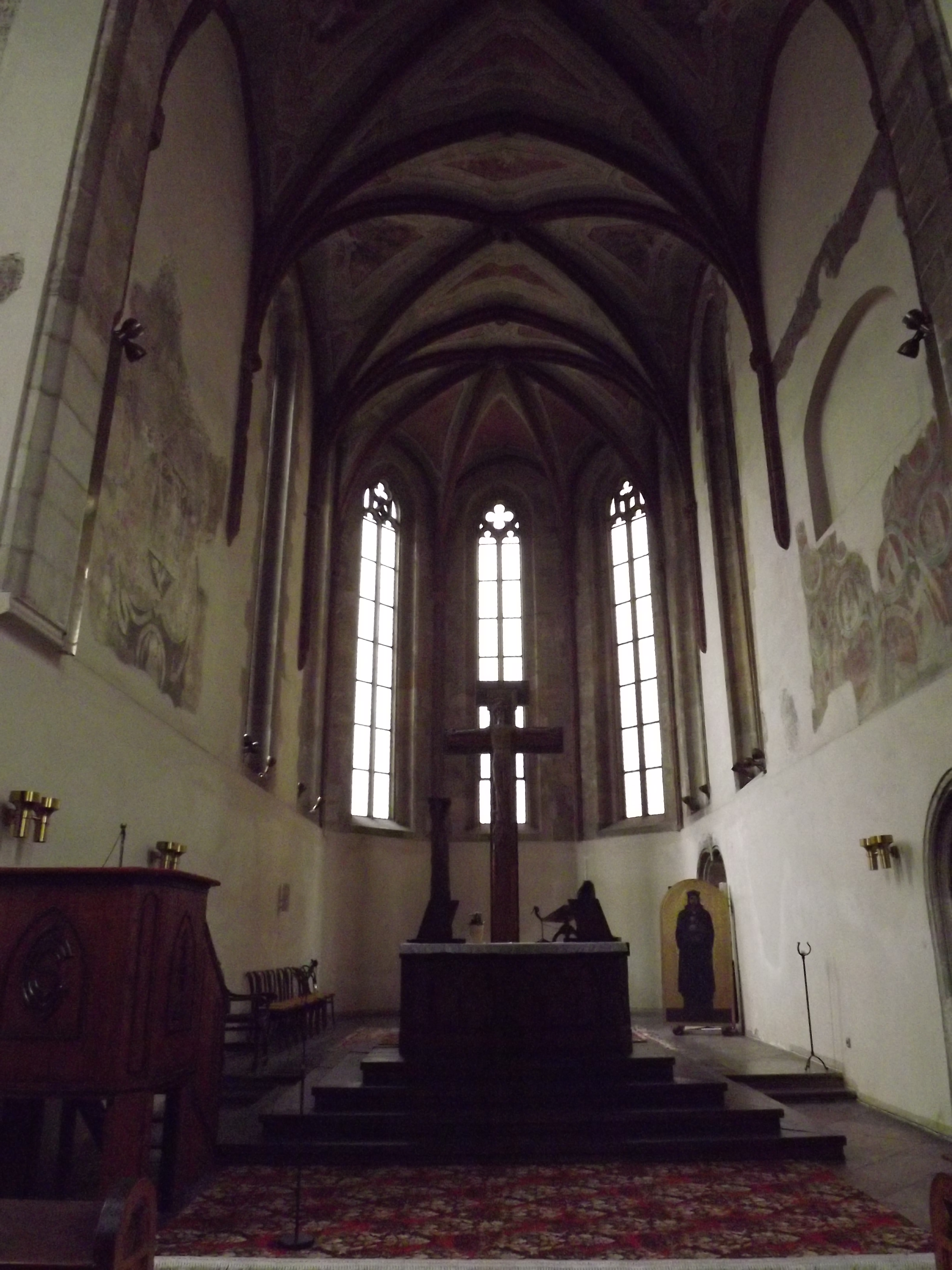
Presbytery

The chancel has two bays of cross vault and a spokewise vaulting at the ending. The ribs, which have a pear-like profile, are placed on pentagonal dosserets ending on the same level as the window cornice. The presbytery and the main nave are separated by a pointed triumphal arc. The nave is vaulted with a late Gothic vault with terracotta ribs, supported by Renaissance Tuscan semi columns. The vault is decorated with late Baroque murals.

==== Murals ====
The murals are tightly connected to book illumination – they capture richly draped figures in rigid groups or epic scenes. There is a symbolic depiction of the maternity of the Blessed Virgin Mary on the northern wall of the presbytery. It was represented by a number of small depictions in a geometric composition. The Tree of Life with medallions depicting the miracles of Jesus is displayed on the southern wall above the entrance to the sacristy.

==== Choir ====
The choir with wooden balustrade stands on Tuscan stone pillars with capitals. There is a painted wooden ceiling under the choir. The western wall under the choir is painted with 4 Latin inscriptions, which were added in the reconstruction from 19th century. There is a columbarium under the choir.

==== Sedilia ====
The sedilia is divided into two parts and it is located on the southern wall of the presbytery.

==== Sacristy ====
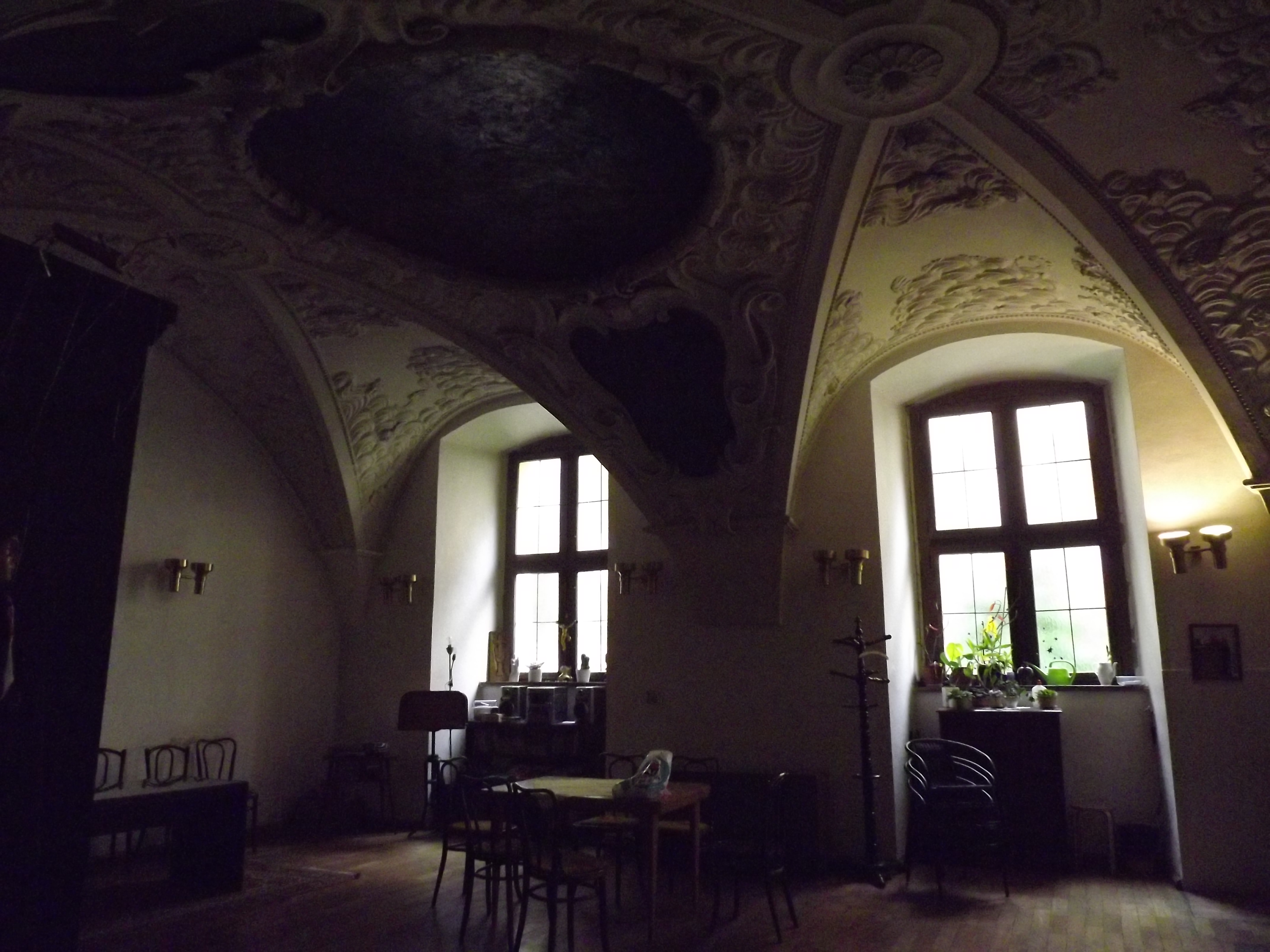
Sacristy

The entrance to the sacristy is in the south wall of the chancel. The pointed portal is profiled in the same way as sedilia. There are remains of original mural above the entrance. The painting depicts the genealogy of Jesus Christ. The Baroque sacristy was built in 17th century. It is square shaped, it has two window axis and a low barrel vault. The vault is covered with rich stuke decorations of leaves and heads of angels.

==== Furnishings ====
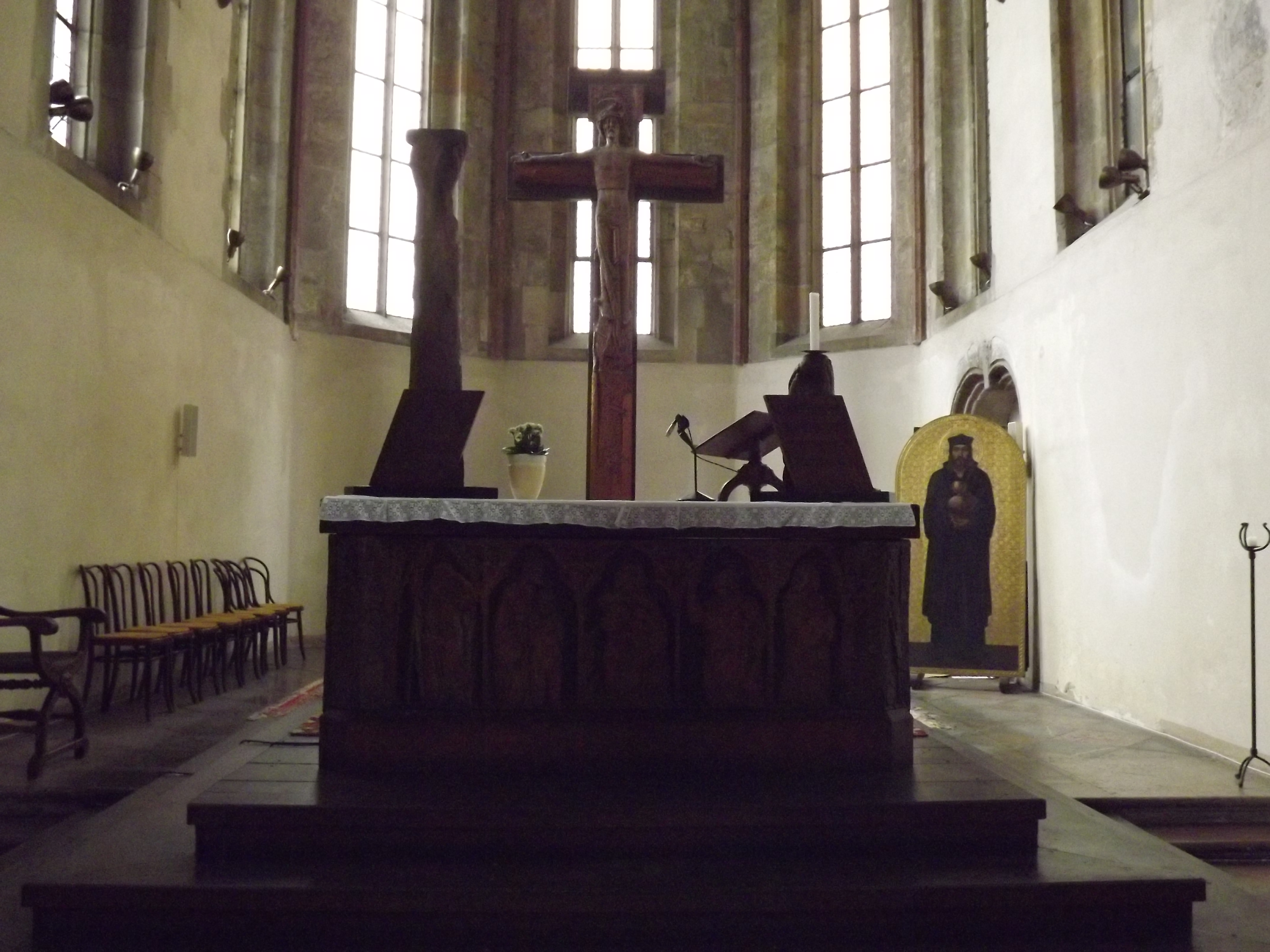
Altar

A large Statue of the Crucifixion stands in the presbytery. It was carved in 1930 by Czech artist František Bílek, who also made the altar table. It is made from larch wood.

The front side of the altar is decorated with carvings of six figures from the Czech history – Forefather Čech, princess Ludmila with prince Wenceslaus, Jan Hus, Jan Žižka and John Amos Comenius. Worth noticing is the candelabrum shaped as human hands.

The benches were designed by František Bílek and made by František Kotyza. Each bench has its own animal motif. The organ is placed in the western part of the church on the organ loft.

==== Chapel of the Holy Sepulchre ====
The inspiration for the Chapel of the Holy Sepulchre in St. Wenceslas Church was the Church of the Holy Sepulchre in Jerusalem. The construction began 8 November 1643. The finished chapel was consecrated 11 May 1645.

== Gallery ==
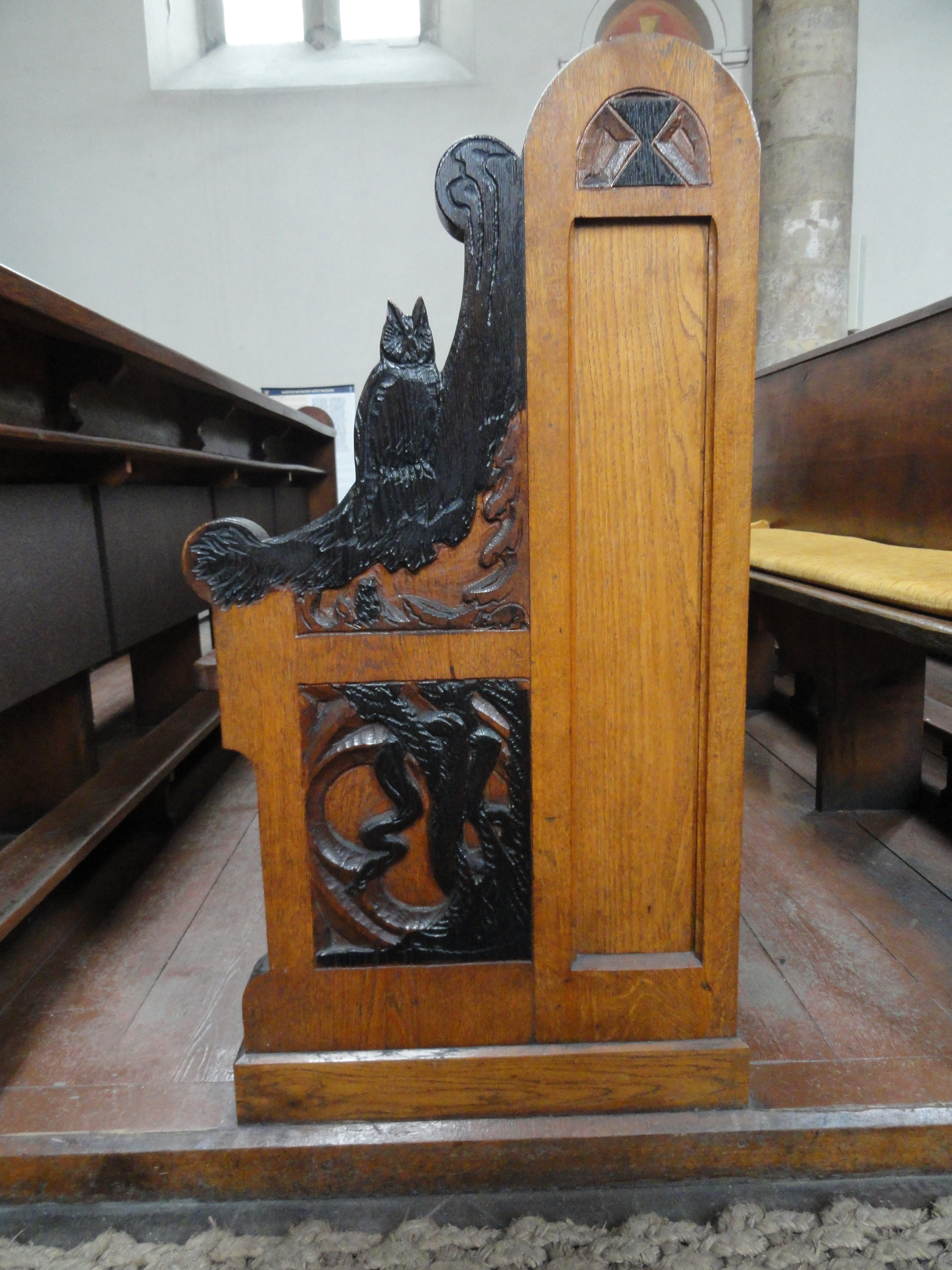
Benches designed by František Bílek and made by František Kotyza

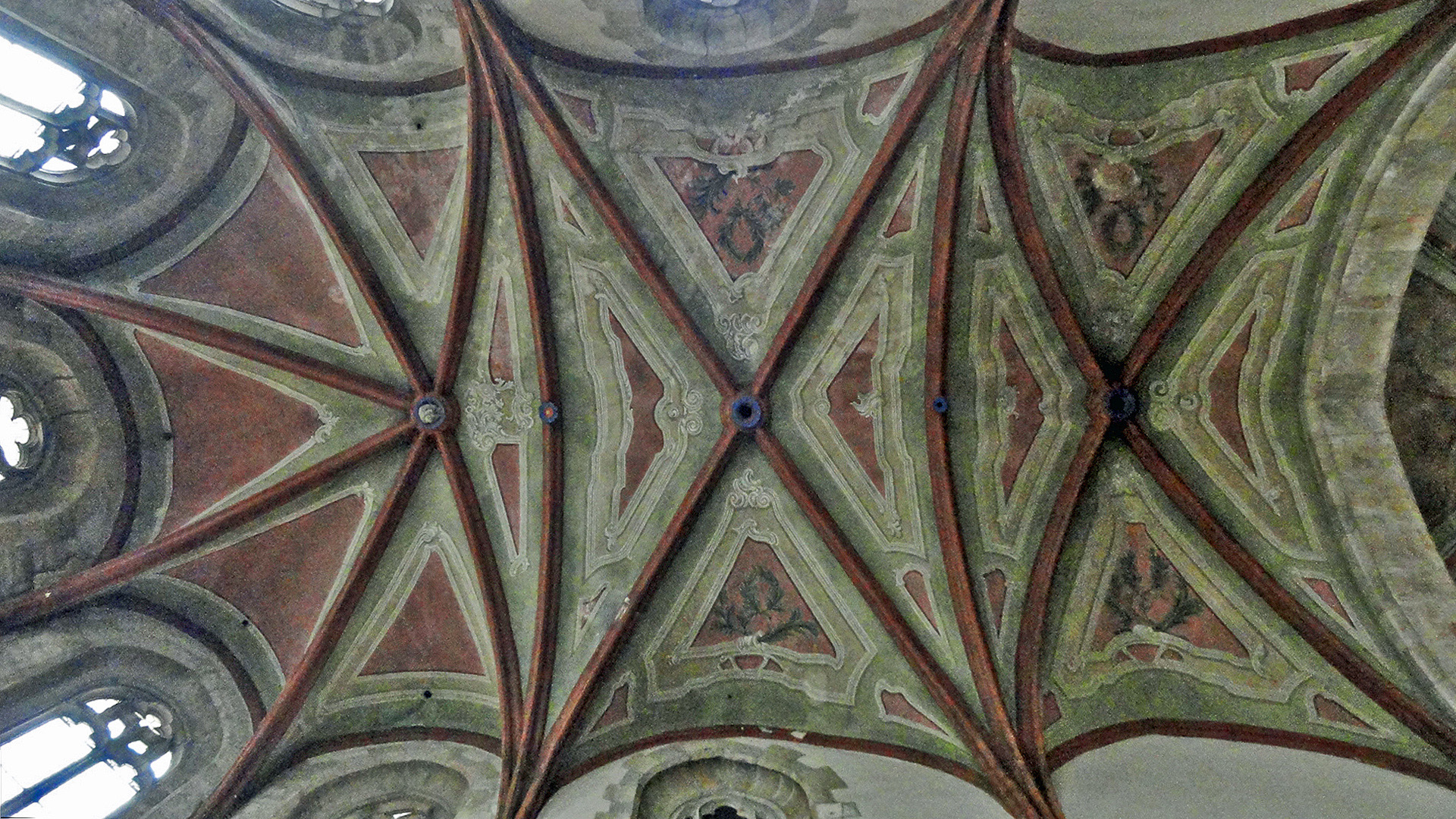
Cross vault above the presbytery

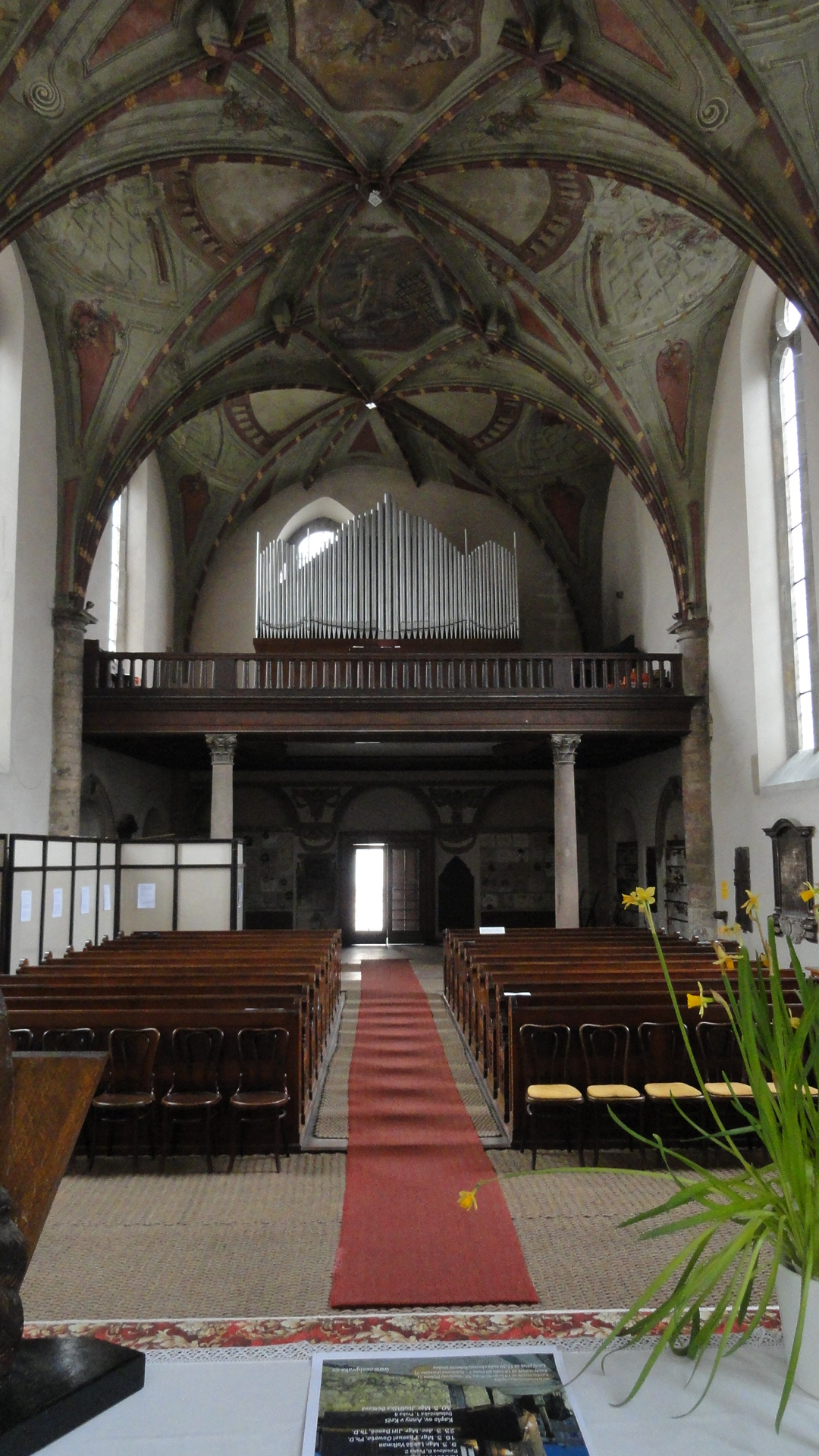
Interior of the church

Plan of the church

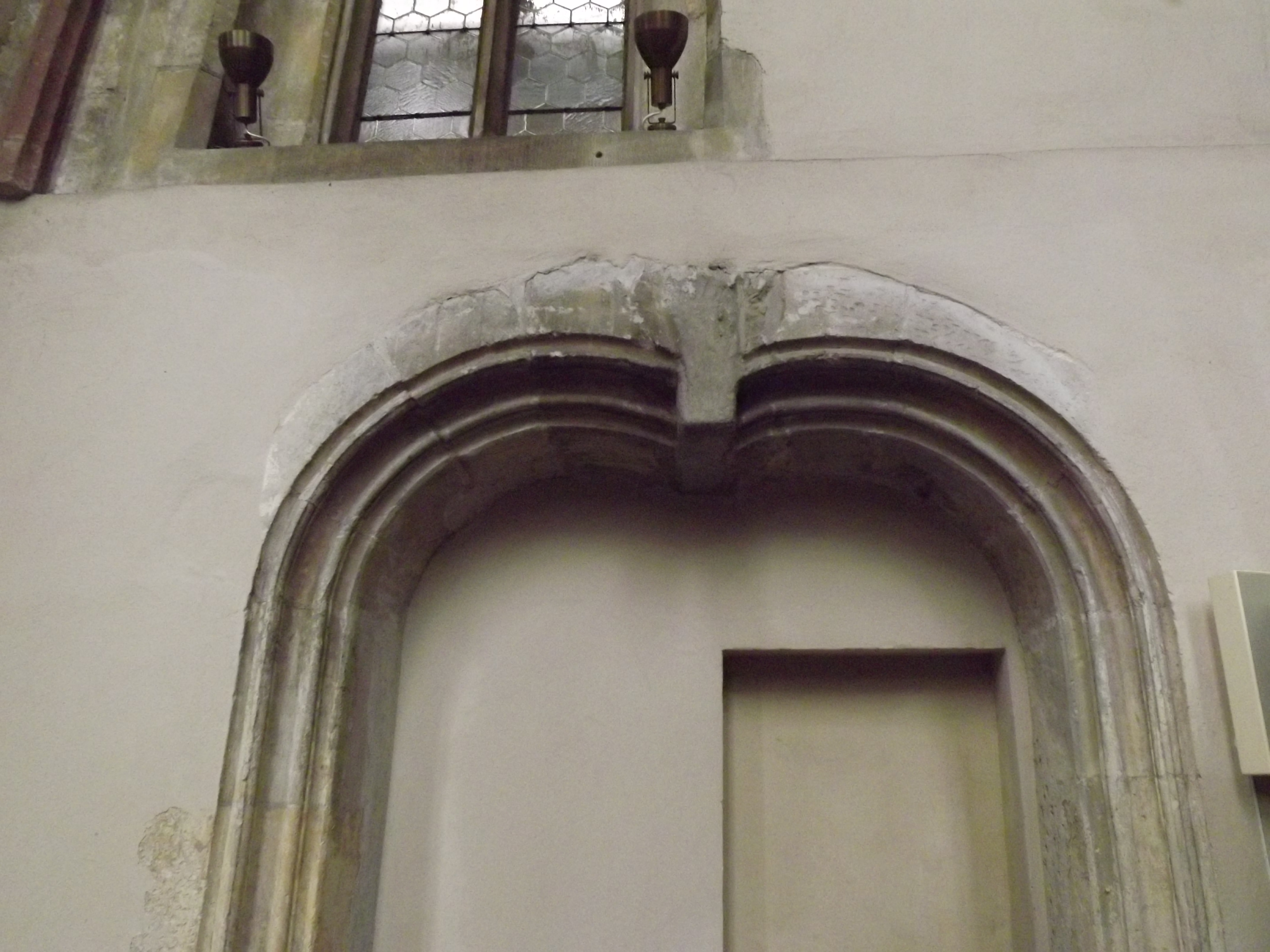
Sedilia

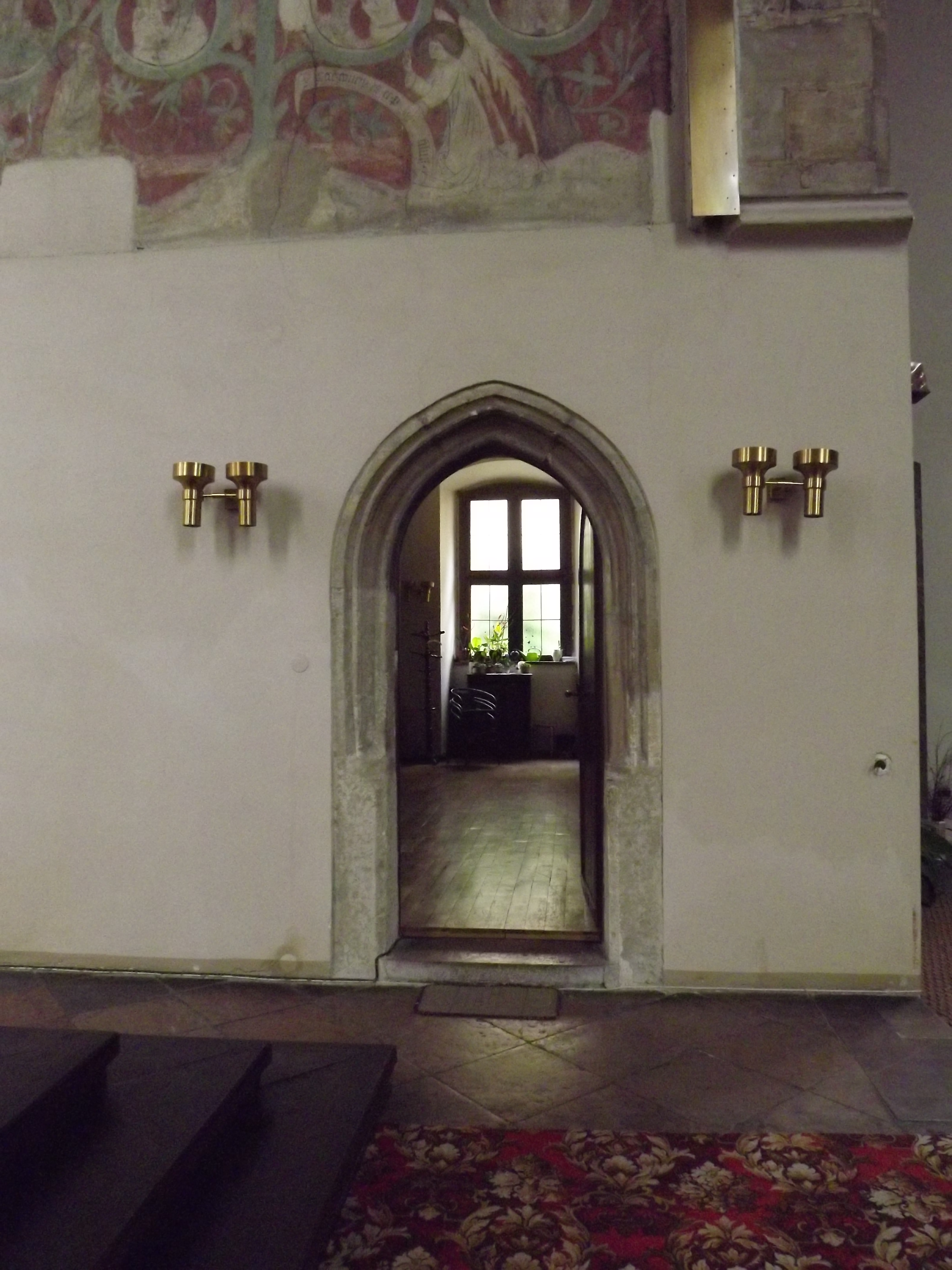
Entrance to the sacristy

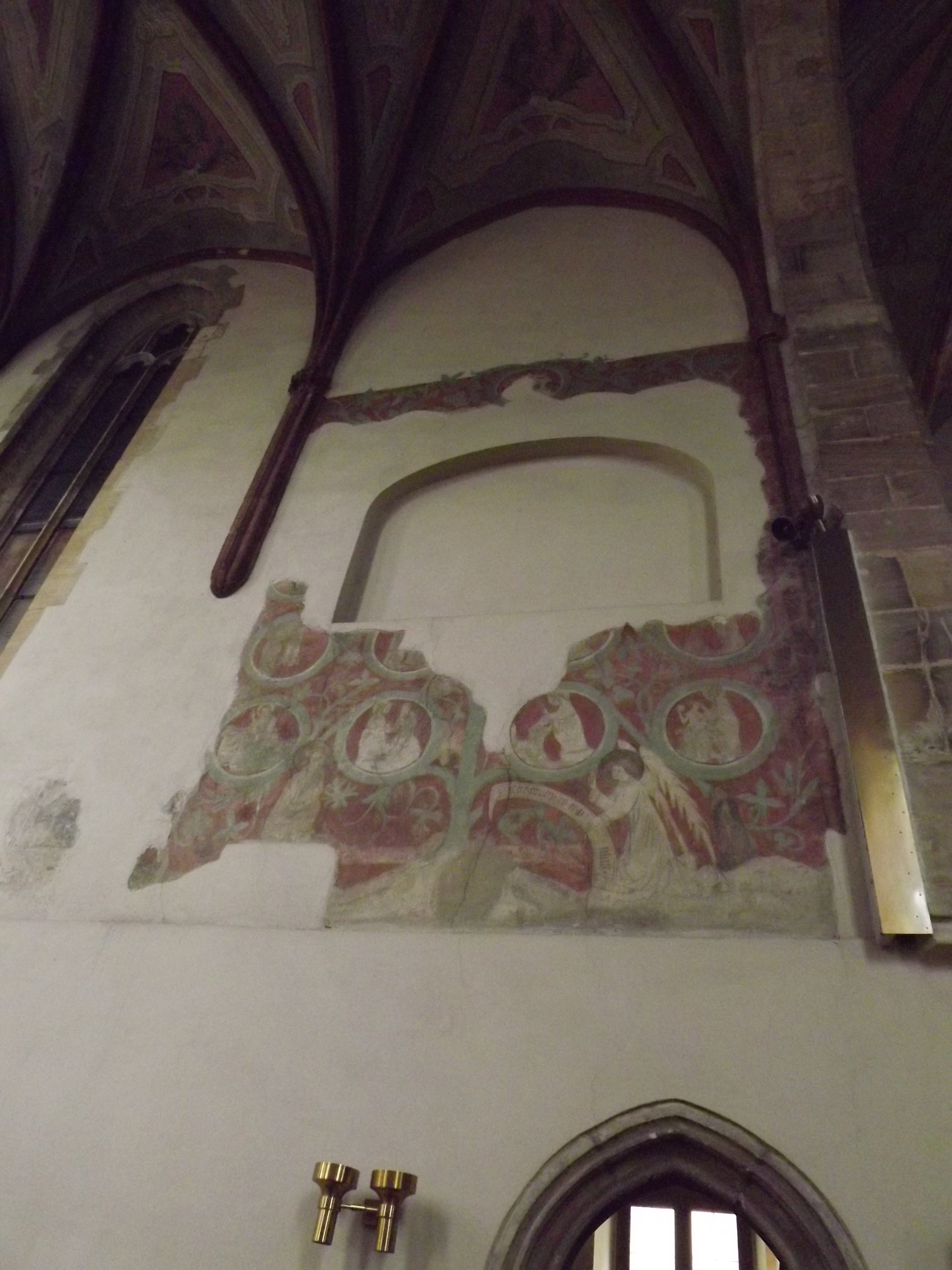
Remains of the murals above the entrance to the sacristy

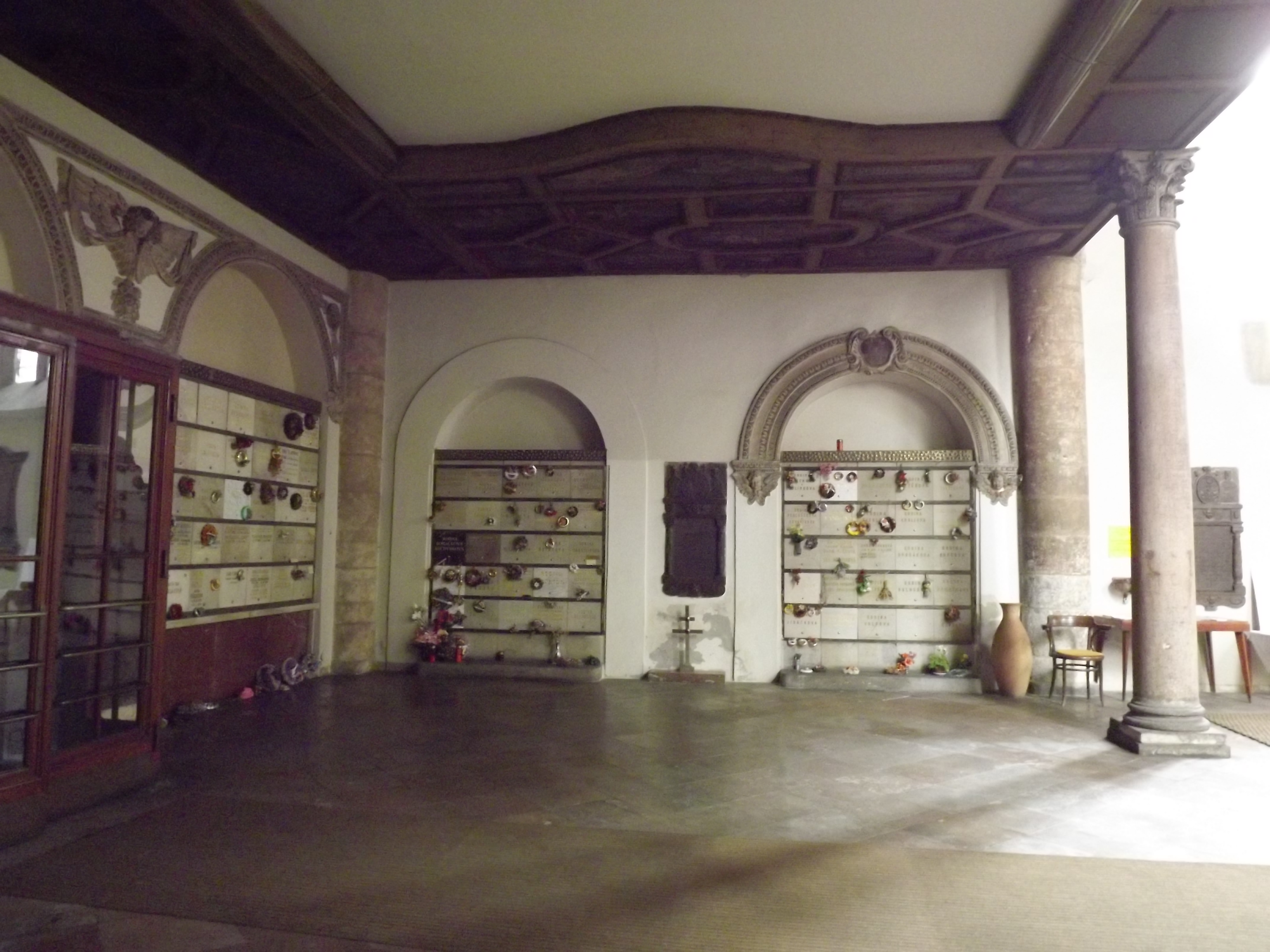
Space under the choir

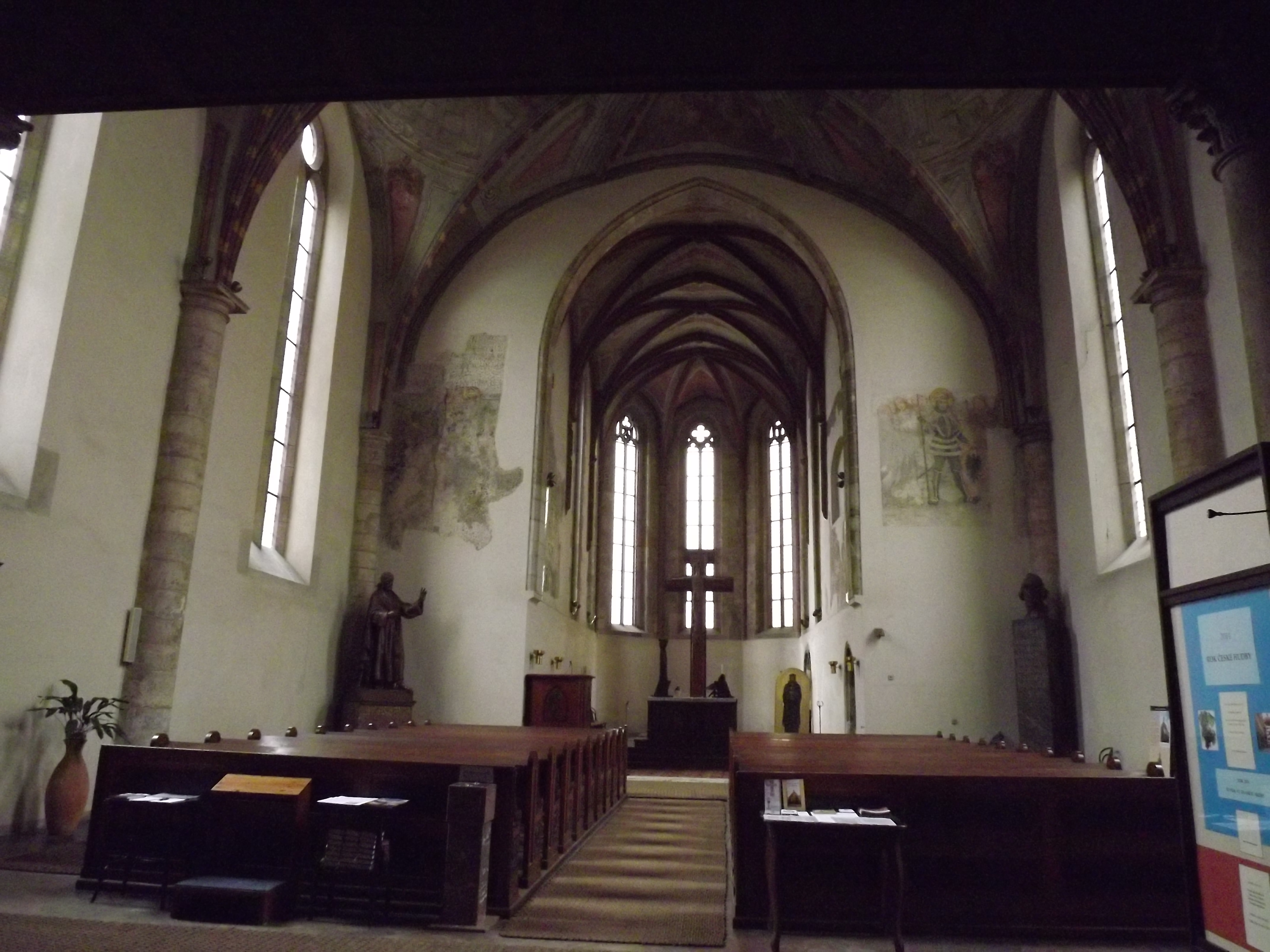
View from the space under the choir

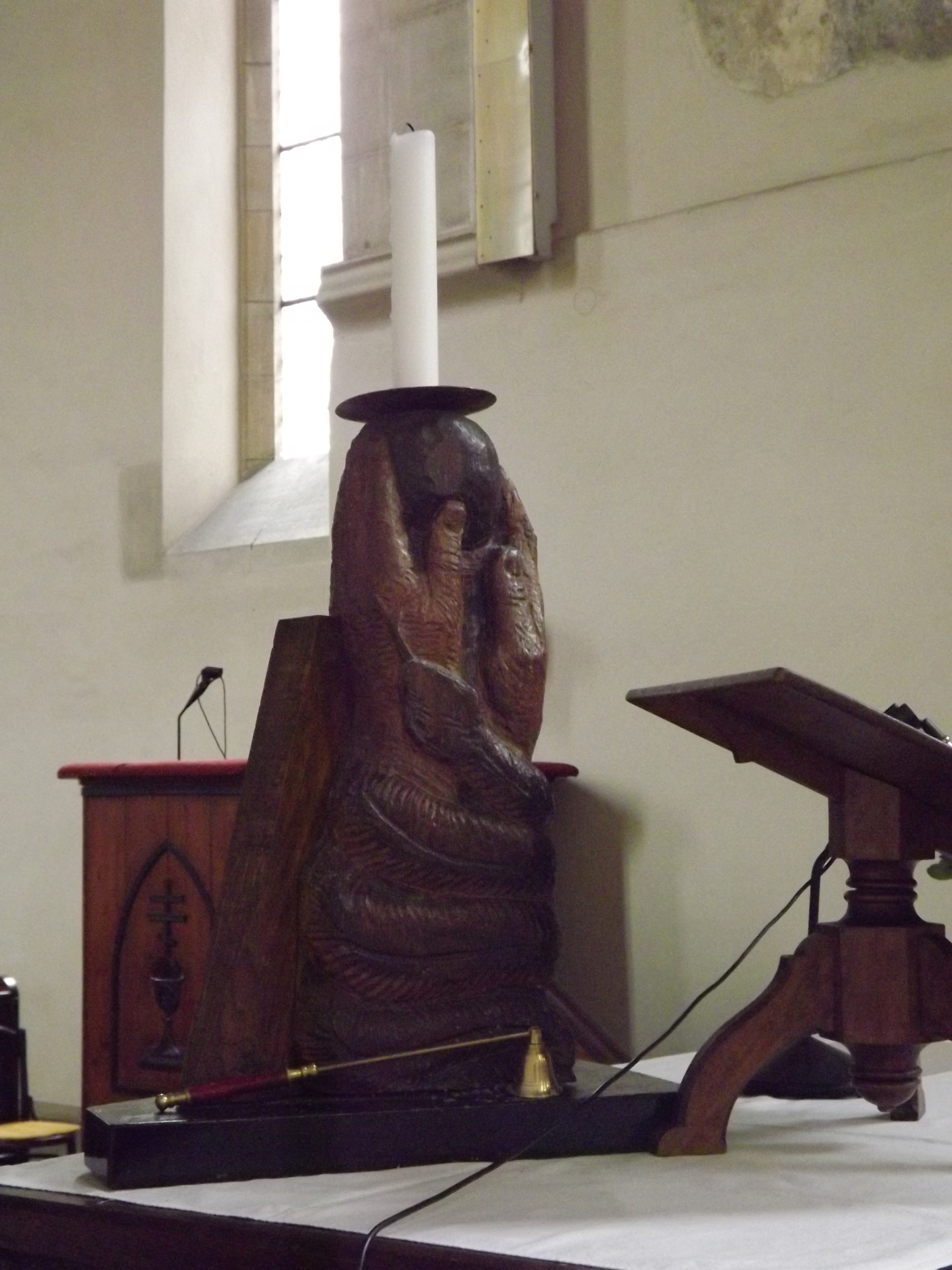
Candelabrum shaped as hands

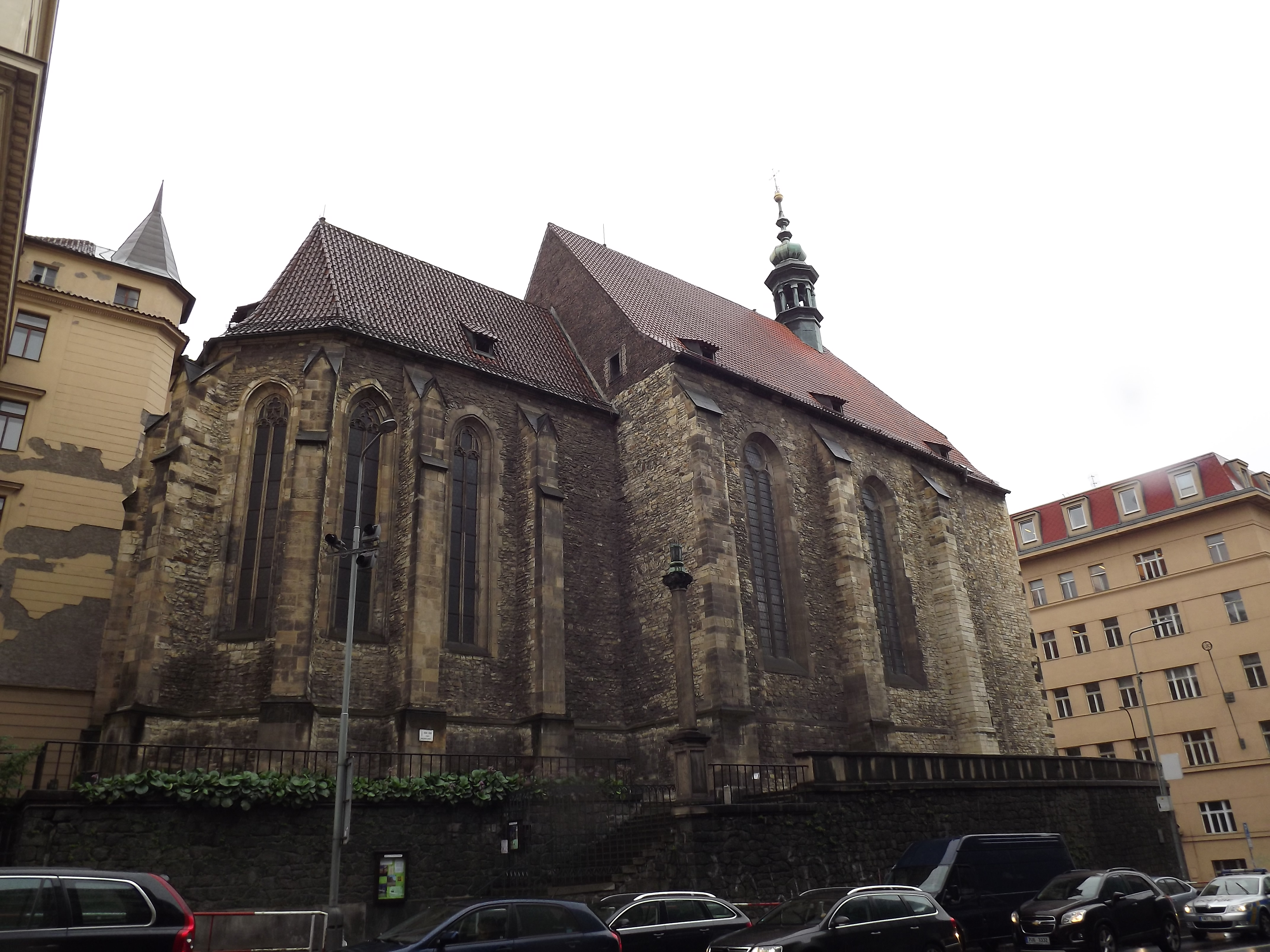
The church at Zderaz from Resslova Street

== Bibliography ==
- BAŤKOVÁ, Růžena a kol. Umělecké památky Prahy Nové Město - Vyšehrad - Vinohrady. Praha : Academia, 1998. 839 s. ISBN 8020005382.
- BUTTA, Tomáš a kol. Kostel svatého Václava na Zderaze. Praha : Náboženská obec Církve československé husitské v Praze 2, 2004. 70 s. ISBN 8086788172.
- CHADRABA, Rudolf a kol. Dějiny českého výtvarného umění I/1. Praha : Academia.
- NEUMANN, Eduard. Kostel sv. Václava na Zderaze. Praha : Rada starších CČS v Praze II, 1929. 46 s.
- PLATOVSKÁ, Marie (ed.). Slavné stavby Prahy 2. Praha : Foibos Books, 2011. 280 s. ISBN 8087073355.
- SEDLÁČKOVÁ, Ema. Kostel svatého Václava na Zderaze. Praha : Výtvarný Odbor Umělecké Besedy, 1946. 24 s.
- SOMMER, Jan. Loď kostela sv. Václava na Zderaz v Praze II. Památky a příroda. 1991, roč. 16, čís. 7, s. 403-407. ISSN 0139-9853.
- LÍBAL, Dobroslav. Katalog gotické architektury v České republice do husitských válek. 1. vyd. Praha: Unicornis, 2001, 607 s. ISBN 80-901587-8-1.
- KALINA, Pavel. Praha 1310-1419: kapitoly o vrcholné gotice. 1. vyd. Praha: Libri, 2004, 237 s. ISBN 80-7277-161-2.
