= Neustupov =

- Market town
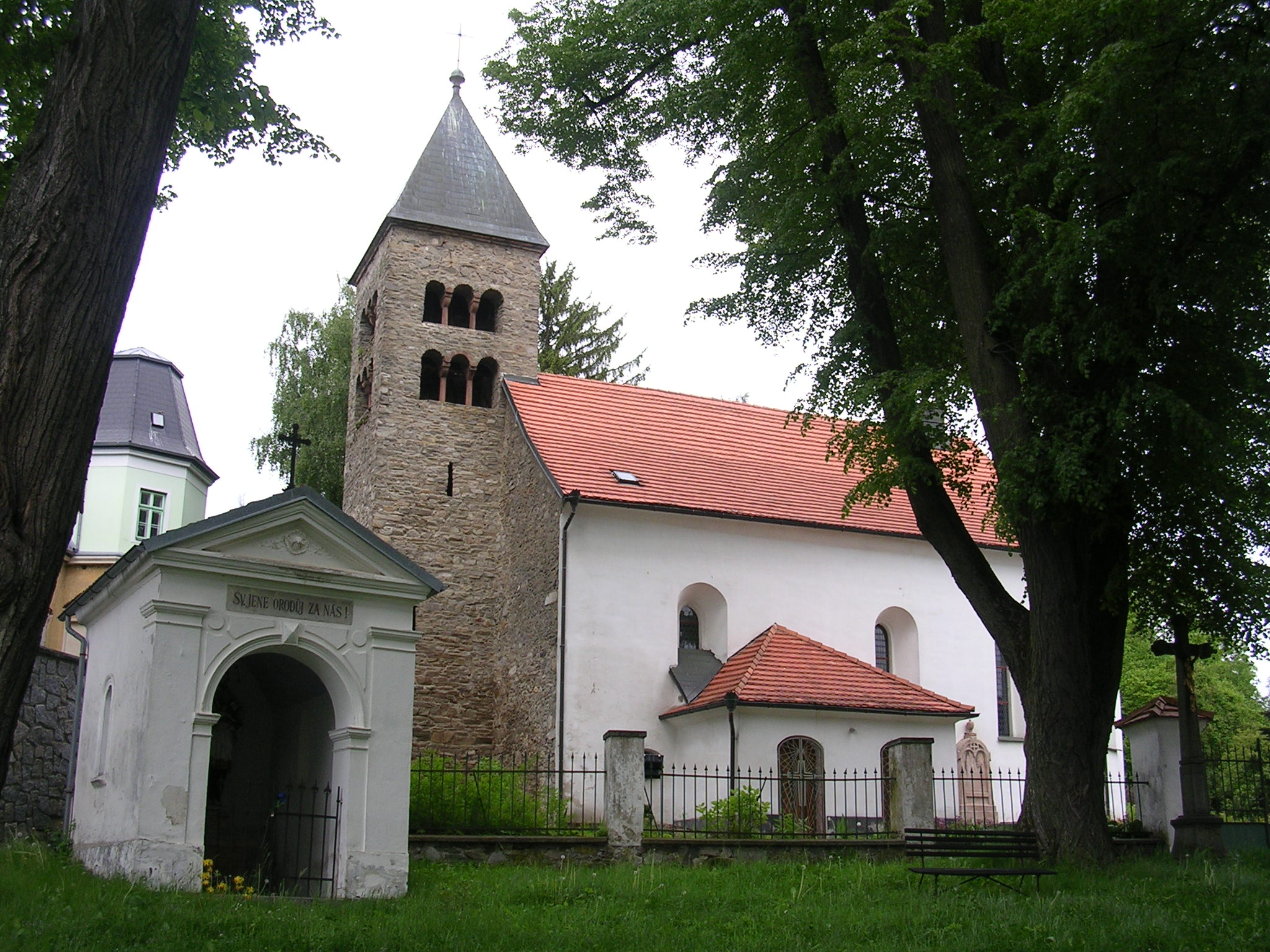
- Church of the Assumption of the Virgin Mary and the Chapel of Saint John of Nepomuk

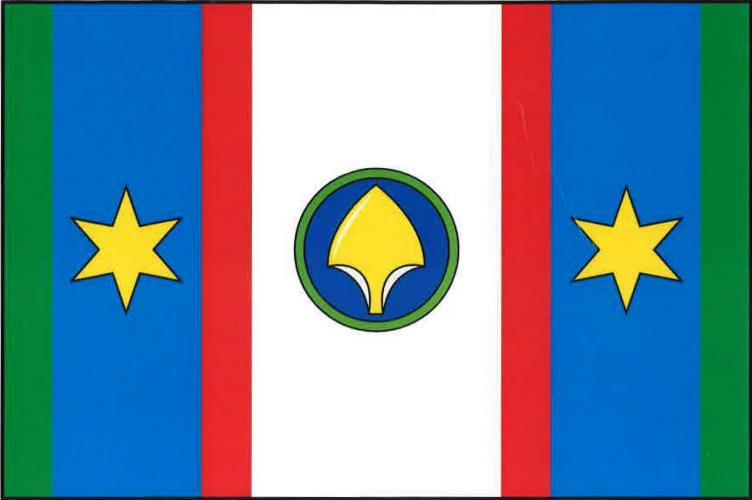
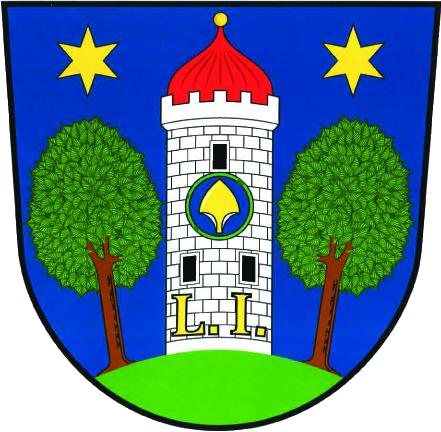
- Flag Coat of arms

- Location in the Czech Republic
- Coordinates: 49°36′54″N 14°41′55″E
- Country: Czech Republic
- Region: Central Bohemian
- District: Benešov
- First mentioned: 1186

Area
  - Total: 28.69 km^{2} (11.08 sq mi)
- Elevation: 511 m (1,677 ft)

Population (2026-01-01)
  - Total: 562
  - Density: 19.6/km^{2} (50.7/sq mi)
- Time zone: UTC+1 (CET)
  - Summer (DST): UTC+2 (CEST)
- Postal codes: 257 03, 257 86
- Website: www.neustupov.cz

Neustupov (Czech pronunciation: [ˈnɛustupof]) is a market town in Benešov District in the Central Bohemian Region of the Czech Republic. It has about 600 inhabitants.

== Administrative division ==
Neustupov consists of 17 municipal parts (in brackets population according to the 2021 census):

- Neustupov (192)
- Barčov (7)
- Bořetice (25)
- Broumovice (37)
- Chlístov (18)
- Dolní Borek (18)
- Hojšín (9)
- Jiřetice (81)
- Královna (30)
- Podlesí (44)
- Sedlečko (6)
- Slavín (1)
- Vlčkovice (33)
- Vrchy (2)
- Záhoříčko (18)
- Zálesí (2)
- Žinice (10)

== Etymology ==
The initial name of the settlement was Neostupov. The name was derived from the personal name Neostup, meaning "Neostup's (court)".

== Geography ==
Neustupov is located about 18 kilometres (11 mi) south of Benešov and 50 km (31 mi) south of Prague. It lies in the Vlašim Uplands. The highest point of Neustupov and of the entire Benešov District is the Mezivrata hill at 713 m (2,339 ft) above sea level. The stream Slupský potok originates here and flows across the territory. It supplies a local system of fishponds.

== History ==
The first written mention of Neustupov is from 1186. The village was promoted to a market town by Emperor Leopold I in 1666.

== Demographics ==
Historical population

Year	Pop.	±%
1869	2,281	—
1880	2,263	−0.8%
1890	2,199	−2.8%
1900	2,067	−6.0%
1910	1,901	−8.0%

Year	Pop.	±%
1921	1,643	−13.6%
1930	1,563	−4.9%
1950	1,059	−32.2%
1961	1,071	+1.1%
1970	960	−10.4%

Year	Pop.	±%
1980	775	−19.3%
1991	588	−24.1%
2001	518	−11.9%
2011	512	−1.2%
2021	533	+4.1%

Source: Censuses

== Economy ==
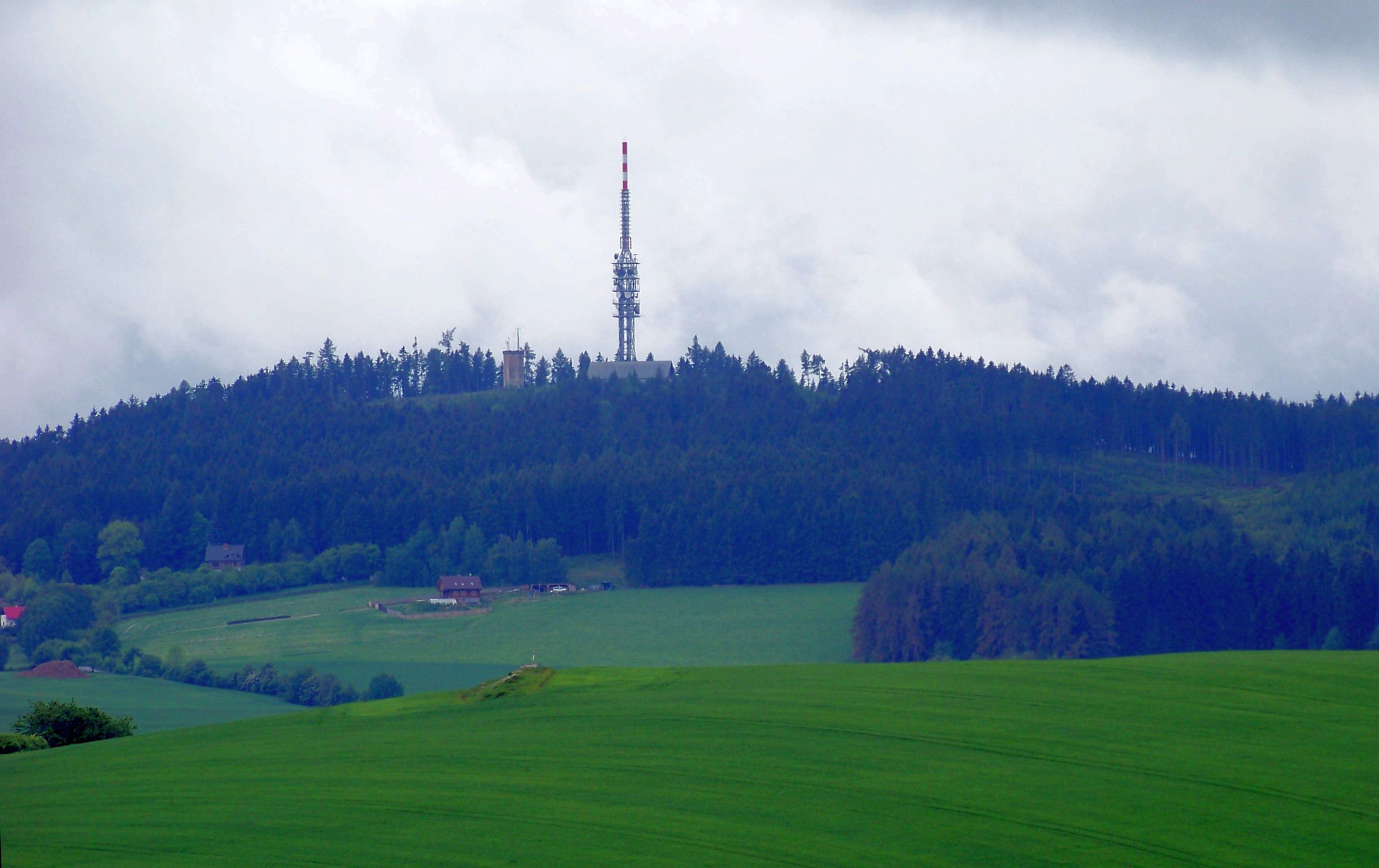
Mezivrata hill

On the top of the Mezivrata hill is a 102 m (335 ft) tall lattice radio tower for FM-/TV-broadcasting. It was built in 1989.

== Transport ==
There are no railways or major roads passing through the municipality.

== Sights ==
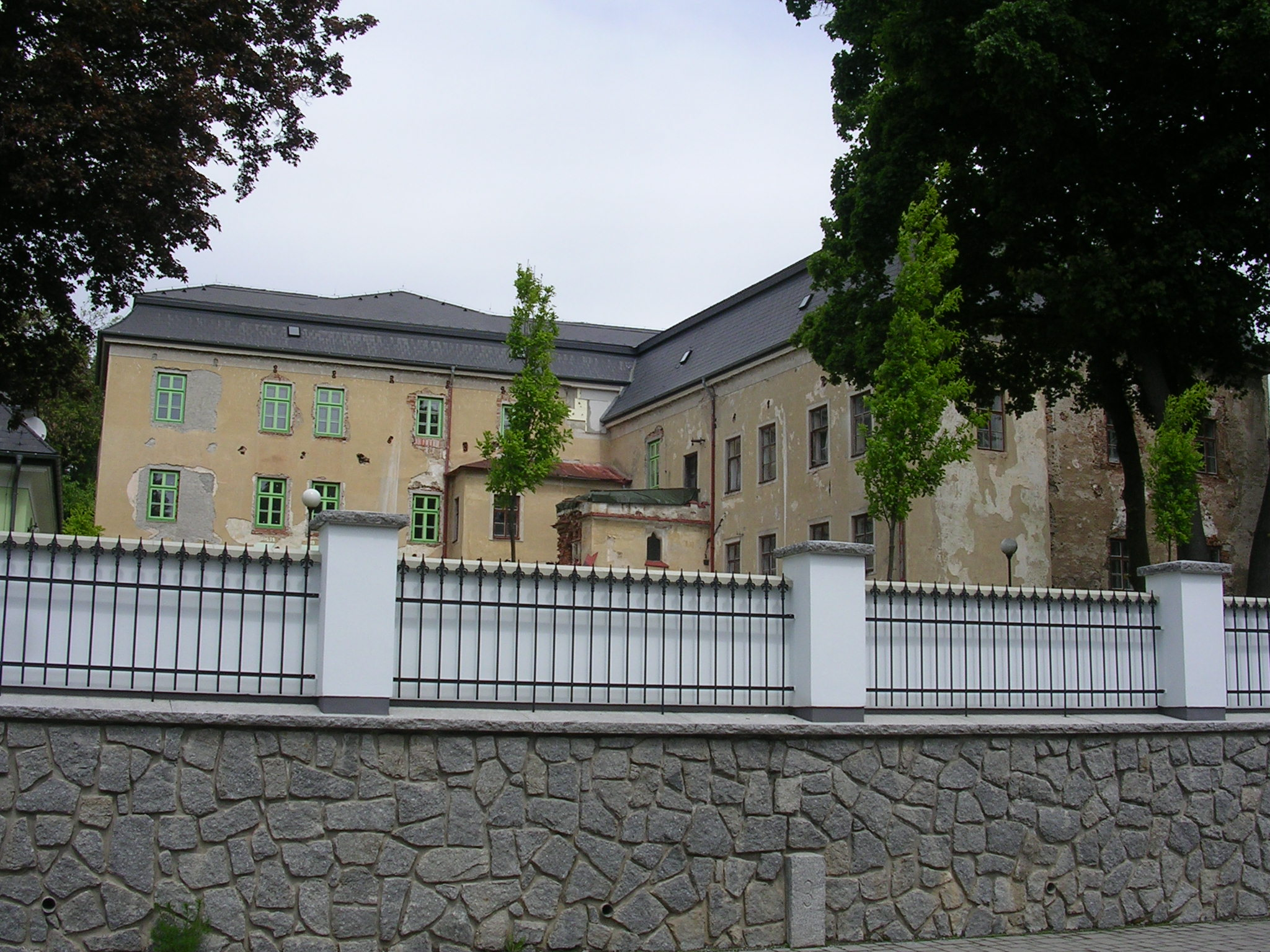
Neustupov Castle

The Church of the Assumption of the Virgin Mary was originally a Romanesque church, probably from the first half of the 12th century. It was rebuilt several times, but its Romanesque tower has been preserved. Next to the church is a rectory built in 1829–1834.

The second landmark is the Neustupov Castle. It was built in the 17th century, on the site of an old fortress from the 12th or 13th century. It was rebuilt and extended many times and today it has the neo-Gothic form. It is privately owned and inaccessible to the public.

== Notable people ==
- Julie Fantová-Kusá (1858–1908), suffragette and feminist
