= Julie Fantová-Kusá =

Czech suffragist (1858–1908)

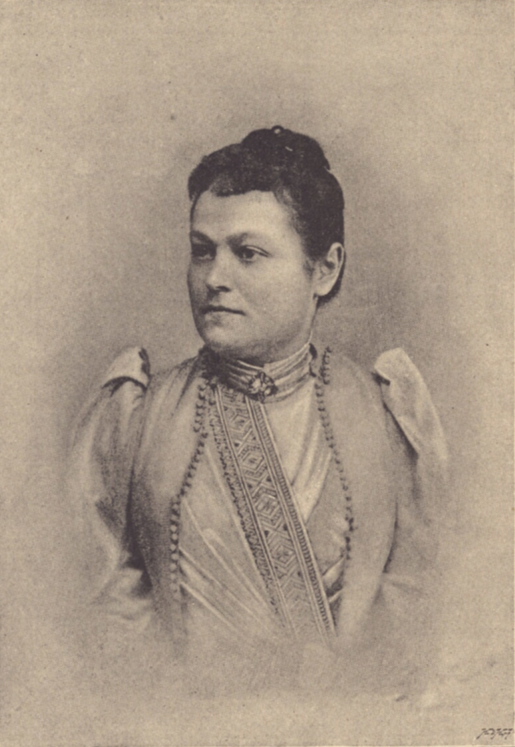
Julie Fantová-Kusá

Julie Fantová-Kusá (17 April 1858 – 18 May 1908) was a Czech social worker, patron, suffragette and feminist. She was the co-founder of the women's associations, Vesna in Brno and the Central Association of Czech Women in Prague.

== Biography ==
Born on 17 April 1858 in Sedlečko in Austria-Hungary (now part of Neustupov in the Czech Republic), Julie Fantová-Kusá was the daughter of landowner Josef Michael Kominík and his wife Josefa Kateřina Kominíková. She graduated from the American Club of Ladies. Between 1881 and 1891, she served as a mayoress of Brno. During her tenure, she founded a vocational school for girls. She also played important role in promoting cultural activities in Brno.

She worked with a number of leading figures of the Czech women's emancipation movement including Eliška Machová, Teréza Nováková, Věnceslava Lužická and Eliška Krásnohorská. She was associated with different feminist organizations, and she made efforts in uniting them. She also worked in defending the rights of women. She advocated equal social opportunities for women including more access to education, and the right to vote.

In 1880, she married Wolfgang Kusý, a Brno lawyer. She was widowed in 1886. In 1895, she married the architect Josef Fanta from Prague.

She died on 18 May 1908 in Prague at the age of 50.
