= Prace, Czech Republic =

Prace
- Municipality
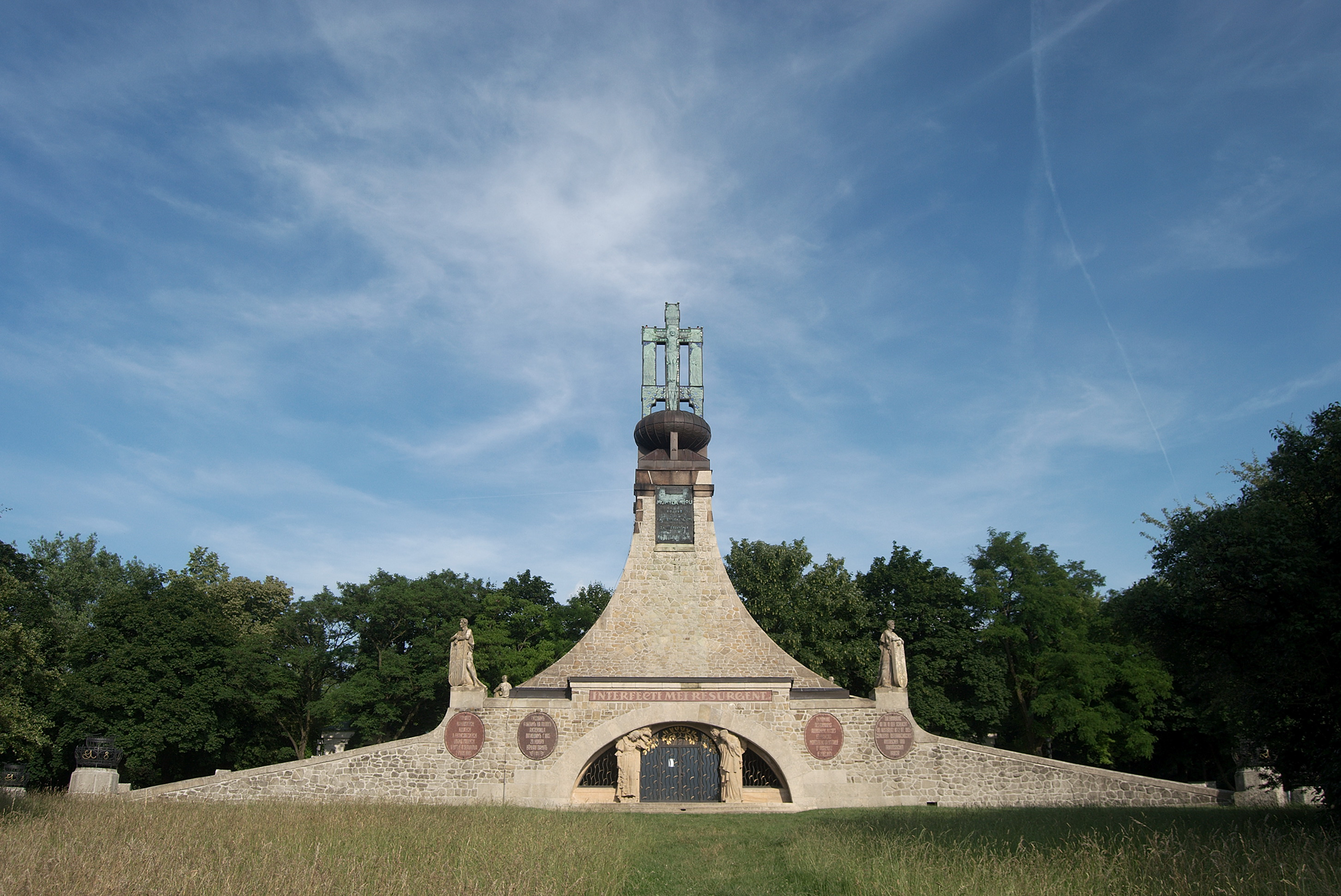
- Cairn of Peace Monument

- Flag Coat of arms

- Location in the Czech Republic
- Coordinates: 49°8′28″N 16°45′55″E
- Country: Czech Republic
- Region: South Moravian
- District: Brno-Country
- First mentioned: 1274

Area
  - Total: 4.71 km^{2} (1.82 sq mi)
- Elevation: 245 m (804 ft)

Population (2026-01-01)
  - Total: 996
  - Density: 211/km^{2} (548/sq mi)
- Time zone: UTC+1 (CET)
  - Summer (DST): UTC+2 (CEST)
- Postal code: 664 58
- Website: www.praceubrna.cz

Prace (German: Pratzen) is a municipality and village in Brno-Country District in the South Moravian Region of the Czech Republic. It has about 1,000 inhabitants.

== Geography ==
Prace is located about 12 kilometres (7 mi) southeast of Brno. It lies in the Dyje–Svratka Valley. The highest point is the hill Pracký kopec at 325 m (1,066 ft) above sea level.

== History ==
The first written mention of Prace is from 1274.

The pivotal action in the Battle of Austerlitz was fought over a nearby elevated area of Pracký kopec.

== Demographics ==
Historical population

Year	Pop.	±%
1869	589	—
1880	842	+43.0%
1890	837	−0.6%
1900	845	+1.0%
1910	873	+3.3%

Year	Pop.	±%
1921	895	+2.5%
1930	966	+7.9%
1950	866	−10.4%
1961	931	+7.5%
1970	884	−5.0%

Year	Pop.	±%
1980	832	−5.9%
1991	785	−5.6%
2001	847	+7.9%
2011	884	+4.4%
2021	911	+3.1%

Source: Censuses

== Transport ==
There are no railways or major roads passing through the municipality.

== Sights ==
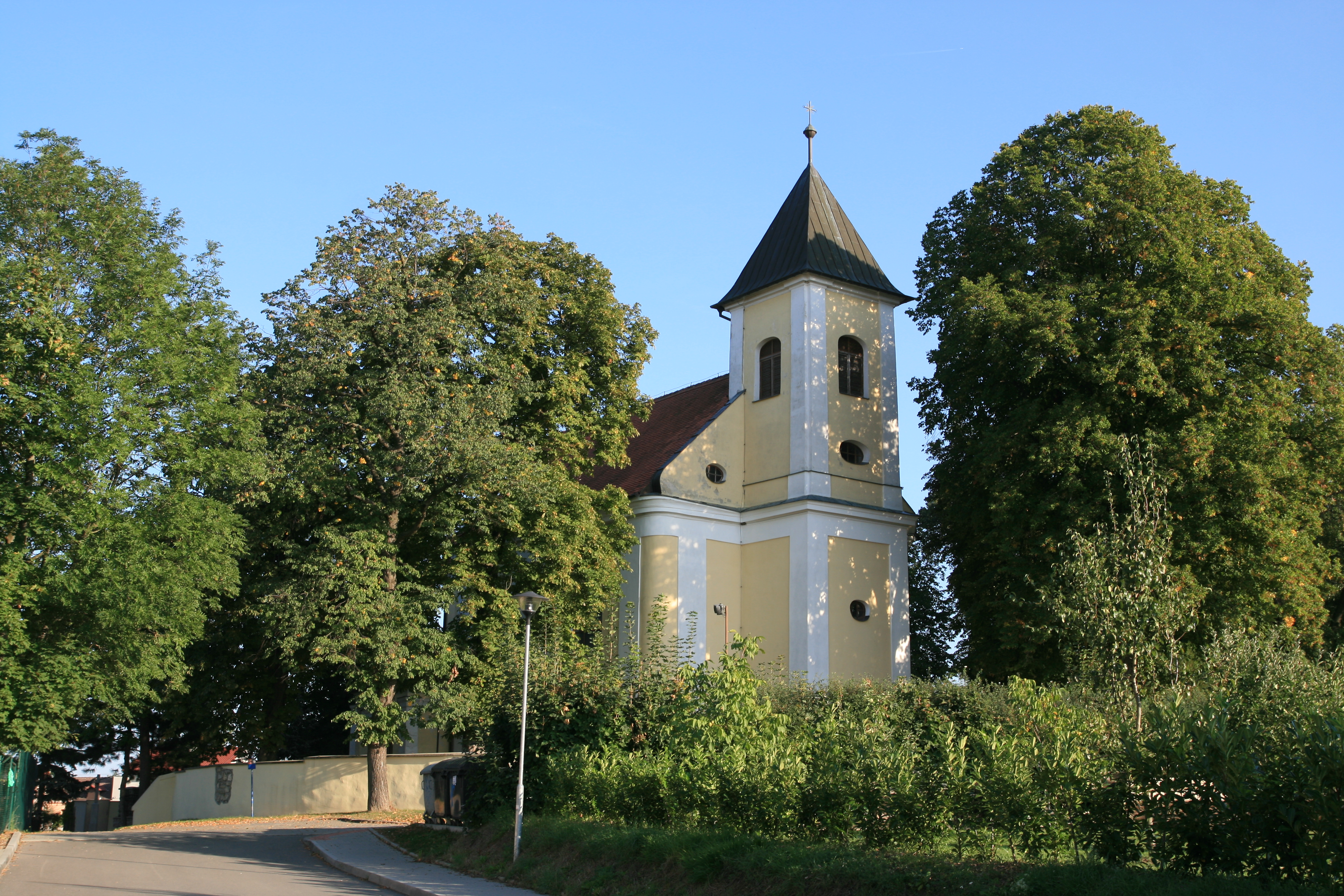
Church of the Exaltation of the Holy Cross

The main landmark of Prace is the Church of the Exaltation of the Holy Cross. It was originally a Baroque church, rebuilt in the Neoclassical style.

The Cairn of Peace Memorial in Prace memorialises those killed in the Battle of Austerlitz. It is an architecturally valuable Gesamtkunstwerk, built in the Art Nouveau style in 1910–1912. The monument symbolises an ancient Slavic burial mound and consists of a four-sided truncated pyramid with a height of 26 metres (85 ft).

A cultural monument is the mass grave of about 800 Russian soldiers who died in the Battle of Austerlitz.
