= Battle of Austerlitz order of battle =

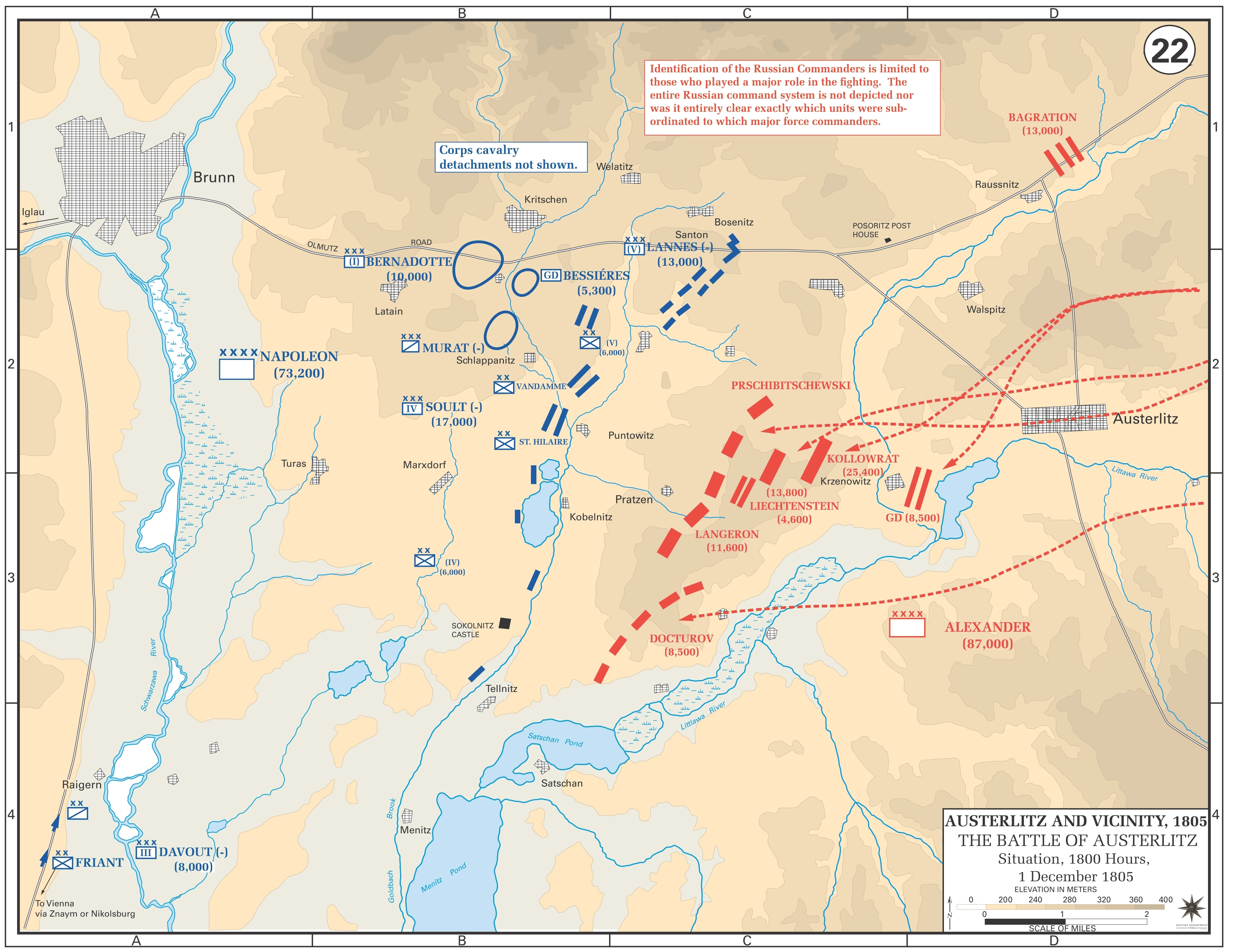
Battle of Austerlitz (1 December 1805)

This is the complete order of battle of the French and Third Coalition armies during the Battle of Austerlitz.

== La Grande Armée ==
The French army was under the supreme command of Emperor Napoleon, with Marshal Louis Alexandre Berthier as his chief of staff. General of division Nicolas-Marie Songis des Courbons commanded the artillery. The overall strength of the French army during the battle is estimated to have been about 73,000 men of all arms and 139 artillery pieces. This number also includes three battalions of men which made up the Army's train d'artillerie.

=== Garde Impériale (French Imperial Guard) ===
Strength: 5,500 men and 24 guns. Marshal Jean-Baptiste Bessières.

- Infantry of the Guard
  - 1er and 2e Battaillons Grenadiers à Pied (foot grenadiers)
  - 1er and 2e Battaillons Chasseurs à Pied (light infantry)
  - The Grenadiers of the Italian Royal Guard
- Cavalry of the Guard
  - Grenadiers à Cheval (horse grenadiers)
  - Chasseurs à Cheval (light cavalry)
  - Les Mamelukes
  - Gendarmerie d'Elite
- Artillery of the Guard
  - Light Artillery of the Guard
  - Artillery Train of the Guard

=== I Corps ===
Strength: 13,000 men and 24 guns. Marshal Jean Baptiste Bernadotte.

- Advanced Guard
  - 27ème Régiment d'lnfanterie Légère (light infantry)
- 1st Division – General of Division Olivier Rivaud de la Raffinière
  - Brigadiers: Bernard Georges François Frère, François Werlé
    - 8ème Régiment d'lnfanterie de Ligne (line infantry)
    - 45ème Régiment d'lnfanterie de Ligne
    - 54ème Régiment d'lnfanterie de Ligne
- 2nd Division – General of Division Jean-Baptiste Drouet
  - Brigadiers: Pierre Charles Dumoulin, Michel-Marie Pacthod
    - 94ème Régiment d'lnfanterie de Ligne
    - 95ème Régiment d'lnfanterie de Ligne
- Light Cavalry Division – General of Division François Etienne de Kellermann
  - 1st Brigade – General of Brigade Frédéric Marisy
    - 2ème Régiment de Hussards (hussars)
    - 5ème Régiment de Hussards
  - 2nd Brigade – General of Brigade Joseph Denis Picard
    - 4ème Régiment de Hussards
    - 5ème Régiment de Chasseurs à Cheval

=== III Corps ===
Strength: 4,300 men (including 830 cavalry) and 12 guns. Marshal Louis Nicolas Davout.

- 2nd Division – General of Division Louis Friant
  - 1st Brigade – General of Brigade Georges Kister
    - 15ème Régiment d'lnfanterie Légère
    - 33ème Régiment d'lnfanterie de Ligne
  - 2nd Brigade – General of Brigade Pierre-Charles Lochet
    - 48ème Régiment d'lnfanterie de Ligne
    - 111ème Régiment d'lnfanterie de Ligne
  - 3rd Brigade – General of Brigade Étienne Heudelet de Bierre
    - 108ème Régiment d'lnfanterie de Ligne
  - 1st Regiment des Dragons (attached from Klein's 1st Dragoon Div.)
- 4th Dragoon Division – General François Antoine Louis Bourcier
  - 1st Brigade – General of Brigade Louis Michel Antoine Sahuc
    - 15ème Régiment des Dragons (dragoons)
    - 17ème Régiment des Dragons
  - 2nd Brigade – General of Brigade Claude Joseph de Laplanche-Morthières
    - 18ème Régiment des Dragons
    - 19ème Régiment des Dragons
  - 3rd Brigade – General of Brigade Jean Christophe Collin
    - 25ème Régiment des Dragons
    - 27ème Régiment des Dragons
- Corps Artillery (8x 8-pdr & 4x 6" howitzer)

=== IV Corps ===
Strength: 23,600 men and 35 guns. Marshal Nicolas Jean de Dieu Soult

- 1st Division – General of Division Louis Vincent Le Blond de Saint-Hilaire
  - 1st Brigade – General of Brigade Charles Antoine Morand
    - 10ème Régiment d'lnfanterie Légère
  - 2nd Brigade – General of Brigade Paul Thiébault
    - 14ème Régiment d'lnfanterie de Ligne
    - 36ème Régiment d'lnfanterie de Ligne
  - 3rd Brigade – General of Brigade Louis-Prix Varé
    - 43ème Régiment d'lnfanterie de Ligne (attached to Vandamme's Div. during battle)
    - 55ème Régiment d'lnfanterie de Ligne (attached to Vandamme's Div. during battle)
- 2nd Division – General of Division Dominique Joseph Rene Vandamme
  - 1st Brigade – General of Brigade Joseph François Ignace Maximilien Schiner
    - 24ème Régiment d'lnfanterie Légère
  - 2nd Brigade – General of Brigade Claude François Ferey
    - 4ème Régiment d'lnfanterie de Ligne
    - 28ème Régiment d'lnfanterie de Ligne
  - 3rd Brigade – General of Brigade Jacques Lazare Savettier de Candras
    - 46ème Régiment d'lnfanterie de Ligne
    - 57ème Régiment d'lnfanterie de Ligne
- 3rd Division – General of Division Claude Juste Alexandre Legrand
  - 1st Brigade – General of Brigade Pierre Hugues Victoire Merle
    - 26ème Régiment d'lnfanterie Légère
    - Tirailleurs du Pô (Italian light infantry)
    - Tirailleurs Corses (Corsican light infantry)
  - 2nd Brigade – General of Brigade Jean-Baptiste Michel Féry
    - 3ème Régiment d'lnfanterie de Ligne
  - 3rd Brigade – General of Brigade Victor Levasseur
    - 18ème Régiment d'lnfanterie de Ligne
    - 75ème Régiment d'lnfanterie de Ligne
- Light Cavalry Division – General of Brigade Pierre Margaron
  - 8ème Régiment de Hussards (Hussars)
  - 11ème Régiment de Chasseurs à Cheval
  - 26ème Régiment de Chasseurs à Cheval
- Corps Artillery – 35 guns (mostly 12-pdrs)

=== V Corps ===
Strength: 12,700 men and 20 guns. Marshal Jean Lannes

- 1st Division – General of Division Marie-François Auguste de Caffarelli du Falga (attached from 3rd Corps)
  - 1st Brigade – General of Brigade Georges-Henri Eppler
    - 13ème Régiment d'Infanterie Légère
  - 2nd Brigade – General of Brigade Joseph Laurent Demont
    - 17ème Régiment d'Infanterie de Ligne
    - 30ème Régiment d'Infanterie de Ligne
  - 3rd Brigade – General of Brigade Jean Louis Debilly
    - 51ème Régiment d'Infanterie de Ligne
    - 61ème Régiment d'Infanterie de Ligne
- 3rd Division – General of Division Louis Gabriel Suchet
  - 1st Brigade – General of Brigade Michel Claparède
    - 17ème Régiment d'Infanterie Légère
  - 2nd Brigade – General of Brigade Nicolas Léonard Beker
    - 34ème Régiment d'Infanterie de Ligne
    - 40ème Régiment d'Infanterie de Ligne
  - 3rd Brigade – General of Brigade Jean-Marie Valhubert
    - 64ème Régiment d'Infanterie de Ligne
    - 88ème Régiment d'Infanterie de Ligne
- Light Cavalry Division – General of Brigade Anne-François-Charles Trelliard
  - 1st Brigade – General of Brigade Anne-François-Charles Trelliard
    - 9ème Régiment de Hussards
    - 10ème Régiment de Hussards
  - 2nd Brigade – General of Brigade Jean-Louis-François Fauconnet
    - 13ème Chasseurs à Cheval
    - 21ème Chasseurs à Cheval
- Corps Artillery 20 guns (mostly 12-pdrs)

=== Grenadier Division ===
Strength: 5,700 men. General of Division Nicolas Oudinot (present, but convalescent) – effective command given to Grand Marshal of the Palace General of Division Géraud Duroc.

This famous, albeit provisional, formation was composed of elite companies from several regiments that were on garrison duty.

- Carabinier companies (equivalent to grenadiers in light infantry formations) from:

2ème, 3ème, 15ème, 28ème and Peale Régiments d'Infanterie Légère

- Grenadier companies from: 9éme, 13ème, 58ème and 81ème Régiments d'lnfanterie de Ligne

=== Cavalry Reserve ===
Strength: 7,400 sabres and 36 guns. Marshal Prince Joachim Murat

- 1st Heavy Cavalry Division – General of Division Étienne Marie Antoine Champion de Nansouty
  - 1st Brigade – General of Brigade Joseph Piston
    - 1er Régiment de Carabiniers à Cheval (205 in 3 sqns) – Colonel Cochois
    - 2ème Régiment de Carabiniers à Cheval (181 in 3 sqns) – Colonel Morin
  - 2nd Brigade – General of Brigade Armand Lebrun de La Houssaye
    - 2ème Régiment de Cuirassiers (304 in 3 sqns) – Colonel Yvendorff
    - 9ème Régiment de Cuirassiers (280 in 3 sqns) – Colonel Doumerc
  - 3rd Brigade – General of Brigade Antoine Louis Decrest de Saint-Germain
    - 3ème Régiment de Cuirassiers (333 in 3 sqns) – Colonel Preval
    - 12ème Régiment de Cuirassiers (277 in 3 sqns) – Colonel Belfort
  - Artillery: 4th Company, 2nd Artillery Regiment, 92 men.
- 2nd Heavy Cavalry Division – General of Division Jean-Joseph Ange d'Hautpoul
  - 1st Brigade – Colonel Jean-Baptiste Noirot
    - 1er Régiment de Cuirassiers (388 in 3 sqns) – Colonel Guiton
    - 5ème Régiment de Cuirassiers (375 in 3 sqns) – Colonel Noireau
  - 2nd Brigade – General of Brigade Raymond-Gaspard de Bonardi de Saint-Sulpice
    - 10ème Régiment de Cuirassiers (254 in 3 sqns) – Colonel Lataye
    - 11ème Régiment de Cuirassiers (327 in 3 sqns) – Colonel Fouler
  - Artillery: 4th Company, 2nd Artillery Regiment, 42 men
- 2nd Dragoon Division – General of Division Frédéric Henri Walther
  - 1st Brigade – General of Brigade Horace Sébastiani
    - 3ème Régiment de Dragons
    - 6ème Régiment de Dragons
  - 2nd Brigade – General of Brigade Dominique Mansuy Roget
    - 10ème Régiment de Dragons
    - 11ème Régiment de Dragons
  - 3rd Brigade – General of Brigade André Joseph Boussart
    - 13ème Régiment de Dragons
    - 22ème Régiment de Dragons
- 3rd Dragoon Division – General of Division Marc Antoine de Beaumont
  - 1st Brigade – General of Brigade Charles Joseph Boyé
    - 5ème Régiment de Dragons
    - 8ème Régiment de Dragons
  - 2nd Brigade – General of Brigade Nicolas Joseph Scalfort
    - 12ème Régiment de Dragons
    - 16ème Régiment de Dragons
    - 21ème Régiment de Dragons
- Light Cavalry Division – General of Division François Etienne de Kellermann
  - Detached from I Corps
- Light Cavalry Brigade – General of Brigade Édouard Jean Baptiste Milhaud
  - 16ème Régiment de Chasseurs à Cheval
  - 22ème Régiment de Chasseurs à Cheval
- Attached artillery – 36 guns in companies of artillerie à cheval (Horse-Artillery)

== Army of the Third Coalition ==
Opposing the French at Austerlitz were the combined imperial armies of Russia and Austria, under the nominal command of Tsar Alexander I and Emperor Francis II, respectively. However, overall field command was taken by the Russian General of the Infantry Mikhail Illarionovich Golenishchev-Kutuzov; the plan of attack adopted by the allies at Austerlitz belonged to the Austrian Chief of Staff Major General Franz von Weyrother. The Austrian forces were led by Lieutenant General Prince Johann von Liechtenstein. Total strength during the battle is approximately 85,400 men and 278 guns of all types.

=== The Russian Imperial Guard ===
Strength: 6,730 infantry, 3,700 horsemen, 100 Pioneers and 40 guns. Grand Duke Constantine

- Infantry of the Guard – Lieutenant-General Maliutin
- Infantry Brigade – Major-General L. Depreradovich
  - Preobrazhensky Regiment of Life Guards
  - Semenovsky Regiment of Life Guards
  - Izmaylovsky Regiment of Life Guards
  - Guard Jaeger Battalion
  - Leib-Grenadier Regiment – Major-General Lobanov
  - Guard Artillery Battery Nr. 1 (10x 12-pdr)
  - 2 Artillery Batteries (each 10x 6-pdr)
  - Pioneers of the Guard (1 company)
- Cavalry of the Guard – Lieutenant-General Kologrivov
  - Cavalry Brigade – Major-General Jankovich
    - Chevalier Guard Regiment (5 sqns)
    - Lifeguard Horse Regiment (5 sqns)
  - Cavalry Brigade – Major-General N. Depreradovich
    - Lifeguard Hussar Regiment (5 sqns)
    - Lifeguard Cossack Regiment
  - Guard Horse-Artillery Battery Nr. 1 (10x 6-pdr)

=== Advanced Guard of the Tsar's Army ===
Strength: 9,200 infantry, 4,500 horsemen and 42 guns. Lieutenant-General Peter I. Bagration
Infantry

- Infantry Brigade – Major-General Dolgorukov
  - 5th Jaeger Regiment – Major Pantenius
  - 6th Jaeger Regiment – Colonel Belokopytov
- Infantry Brigade – Major-General Nikolay Kamensky
  - Arkhangelgorod Regiment – Colonel Berlizeev
- Infantry Brigade – Major-General Engelhardt
  - Old Ingermanland Infantry Regiment
  - Pskov Infantry Regiment
- 2 Artillery Batteries (each 10 guns)

Cavalry

- Cavalry Brigade – Major-General Ludwig von Wittgenstein
  - Pavlograd Hussar Regiment
  - Mariupol Hussar Regiment
- Cavalry Brigade – Major-General Voropaitzky
  - The Empress Cuirassier Regiment (5 sqns) – Colonel Count de Witt
  - Tver Dragoon Regiment (5 sqns)
  - Saint Petersburg Dragoon Regiment (5 sqns)
- Cossack Brigade – Major-General Tschaplitz
  - Kiselev Cossack Regiment
  - Malakhov Cossack Regiment
  - Khanzhenkov Cossack Regiment
- Horse-Artillery Battery Nr. 1 (12x 6-pdr)
- Horse-Artillery Battery Nr. 4 (6x 6-pdr)
- (Austrian) Horse-Artillery Battery Nr. 5 (6x 6-pdr)

=== Advance Guard of General Friedrich Wilhelm von Buxhoeveden ===
Strength: 3,440 infantry, 3,440 horsemen and 12 light guns. Feldmarschall-Leutnant Michael von Kienmayer

- 1st Infantry Brigade – General-Major Georg Symon de Carneville
  - Brooder Grenz Infantry Regiment Nr. 7 (500 in 1 battalion)
  - 1st Szekler Grenz Infantry Regiment Nr. 14 (1,300 in 2 battalions)
  - 2nd Szekler Grenz Infantry Regiment Nr. 15 (1,300 in 2 battalions)
  - Pioneers (340 in 3 companies)
- 1st Cavalry Brigade – General-Major Karl Wilhelm von Stutterheim
  - O'Reilly Chevau-léger Regiment Nr. 3 (900 in 8 squadrons)
  - Merveldt Uhlan Regiment Nr. 1 (40 in 1 troop)
- 2nd Cavalry Brigade – General-Major Johann Nepomuk von Nostitz-Rieneck
  - Schwarzenberg Uhlan Regiment Nr. 2 (100 in one-half squadron)
  - Hessen-Homburg Hussar Regiment Nr. 4 (600 in 6 squadrons) – Colonel Freiherr von Mohr
- 3rd Cavalry Brigade – General-Major Moritz von Liechtenstein
  - Szekler Hussar Regiment Nr. 11 (800 in 8 squadrons) – Colonel Gabriel Geringer von Odenburg
  - Sysoev Cossack Regiment
  - Melentev Cossack Regiment
- Horse-Artillery Battery Nr. 1 (6x 6-pdr)
- Horse-Artillery Battery Nr. 2 (6x 6-pdr)

=== First column ===
Strength: 13,240 infantry, 250 cavalry, 40 light and 24 heavy guns. Lieutenant-General Dmitry Dokhturov

- 1st Infantry Brigade – Major-General Friedrich von Löwis of Menar
  - 7th Jäger Regiment (1 battalion) – Colonel Pavel P. Tolbukhin
  - New Ingermanland Infantry Regiment (3 battalions)
  - Yaroslav Infantry Regiment (2 battalions)
- 2nd Infantry Brigade – Major-General Urusov
  - Vladimir Infantry Regiment
  - Bryansk Infantry Regiment – Lieutenant-Colonel Nikolai K. Rubanov
  - Vyatka Infantry Regiment
  - Moscow Infantry Regiment
  - Kiev Grenadier Regiment
- Pioneers (1 company)
- Denisov Cossack Regiment
- (Russian) Heavy Battery Nr. 1 (12x 12-pdr)
- (Russian) Heavy Battery Nr. 2 (12x 12-pdr)
- 4 Artillery Batteries (each 10 guns)

=== Second column ===
Strength: 11,250 infantry, 300 horsemen, and 30 light guns. Lieutenant-General Louis Alexandre Andrault de Langeron

- 1st Infantry Brigade – Major-General Zakhar Dmitrievich Olsufiev
  - Viborg Infantry Regiment
  - Perm Infantry Regiment
  - Kursk Infantry Regiment
- 2nd Infantry Brigade – Major-General Sergei Mikhailovich Kamensky
  - Ryazhsk Infantry Regiment
  - Phanagoria Grenadier Regiment
- Pioneers (1 company)
- St. Petersburg Dragoon Regiment
- Isayev Cossack Regiment
- 3 Artillery Batteries (each 10 guns)

=== Third column ===
Strength: 7,700 infantry and 30 light guns. Lieutenant General I. Przybyszewski

- 1st Infantry Brigade – Major-General Ivan I. Muller (or Miller)
  - 7th Jaeger Regiment (2 battalions)
  - 8th Jaeger Regiment
  - Galicia Infantry Regiment
- 2nd Infantry Brigade – Major-General Selekhov
  - Butyrsky Infantry Regiment – Lieutenant-Colonel Treskin M. L`vov
  - Podolia Infantry Regiment
  - Narva Infantry Regiment
- Pioneers (1 company)
- 3 Artillery Batteries (each 10 guns)

=== Fourth column ===
Strength: 13,900 infantry, 52 light and 24 heavy guns. Lieutenant-General Mikhail Miloradovich and Feldmarschall-Leutnant Johann Kollowrat

- Advanced Guard – Lieutenant-Colonel Monakhtin
  - Novgorod Infantry Regiment (1 battalion)
  - Apsheron Infantry Regiment (1 battalion)
  - Archduke John Dragoon Regiment Nr. 1 (2 sqns)
- 1st Infantry Brigade – Major-General Vodniansky
  - Novgorod Infantry Regiment (2 battalions)
  - Apsheron Infantry Regiment (2 battalions)
  - Little Russia Grenadier Regiment
  - Smolensk Infantry Regiment (2 battalions)
- 2nd Infantry Brigade – General-Major Heinrich von Rottermund
  - Kaunitz Infantry Regiment Nr. 20 (900 in 1 battalion)
  - Salzburg Infantry Regiment Nr. 23 (3,000 in 6 battalions)
  - Auersperg Infantry Regiment Nr. 24 (600 in 1 battalion)
- 3rd Infantry Brigade – General-Major Franz von Jurczek (or Jirčik)
  - Kaiser Infantry Regiment Nr. 1 (1,000 in 1 battalion)
  - Czartoryski Infantry Regiment Nr. 9 (600 in 1 battalion)
  - Lindenau Infantry Regiment Nr. 29 (400 in 1 battalion)
  - Württemberg Infantry Regiment Nr. 38 (500 in 1 battalion)
  - Kerpen Infantry Regiment Nr. 49 (700 in 1 battalion)
  - Reuss-Greitz Infantry Regiment Nr. 55 (600 in 1 battalion)
  - Beaulieu Infantry Regiment Nr. 58 (500 in 1 battalion)
  - Vienna Jäger (300 in 2 companies)
- Pioneers (340 in 2 companies)
- Artillery
  - 4 Artillery Batteries (each 6 guns)
  - 2 (Russian) Artillery Batteries (each 10 guns)
  - (Russian) Heavy Battery Nr. 3 (12x 12-pdr)
  - Heavy Battery Nr. 1 (6x 12-pdr)
  - Heavy Battery Nr. 2 (6x 12-pdr)

=== Fifth (cavalry) column ===
Strength: 5,375 horsemen, 24 light pieces. Feldmarschall-Leutnant Prince Johann von Liechtenstein with Feldmarschall-Leutnant Ludwig Prinz zu Hohenlohe-Bartenstein and Lieutenant-General Alexander Essen

- 1st Cavalry Brigade – General-Major Johann Karl Caramelli
  - Nassau Cuirassier Regiment Nr. 5 (300 in 6 sqns) – Colonel Friedrich von Minutillo
  - Lorraine Cuirassier Regiment Nr. 7 (300 in 6 sqns) – Colonel Clemens Freiherr von Thunefeld
- 2nd Cavalry Brigade – General-Major Johann Weber von Treuenfels
  - Kaiser Cuirassier Regiment Nr. 1 (500 in 8 sqns) – Colonel Wilhelm von Motzen
- 3rd Cavalry Brigade – Major-General Gladkov
  - Grand Duke Constantine Uhlan Regiment Nr. 3 – Major-General Meller-Zakomelski
  - Gordeev Cossack Regiment
  - Isayev Cossack Regiment
  - Denisov Cossack Regiment
- 4th Cavalry Brigade Lieutenant-General Adjutant F. P. Uvarov
  - Chernigov Dragoon Regiment (5 sqns)
  - Kharkov Dragoon Regiment (5 sqns)
  - Elisabetgrad Hussar Regiment
- (Russian) Horse-Artillery Battery Nr. 2 (12x 6-pdr)
- (Russian) Horse-Artillery Battery Nr. 3 (12x 6-pdr)
- Horse-Artillery Battery Nr. 3 (6x 6-pdr)
