= Kiselyov =

Kiselyov/Kiseliov/Kiselev (Russian: Киселёв; masculine) or Kiselyova/ Kiseleva (Киселёва; feminine) is a Russian surname, derived from the word "kissel". It may refer to:

- Aharon Moshe Kiselev (1866–1949), Manchurian rabbi
- Alexander Kiselyov, several people
- Alexey Kiselyov, several people
- Andrey Kiselyov (1852–1940), Russian and Soviet mathematician
- Axel Kicillof, Argentine politician
- Dmitri Kiselev (born 1989), Russian ice dancer
- Dmitrii Kiselev, Russian handball player
- Dmitry Kiselyov (born 1954), Russian television presenter and propagandist
- Dmitry Kiselyov (film director)
- Larisa Kiselyova (born 1970), Russian handball player
- Mariya Kiselyova (born 1974), Russian swimmer
- Mikhail Kiselyov (born 1986), Russian politician
- Nikolay Kiselyov, several people:
  - Nikolay Kiselyov (soldier) (1913–1974), Soviet soldier, prisoner of war and partisan commander, Righteous Among the Nations
  - Nikolay Kiselyov (athlete) (1939–2005), Soviet Nordic combined skier, silver medalist at the 1964 Winter Olympics
  - Nikolay Kiselyov (footballer) (born 1946), Soviet international footballer and manager
  - Nikolay Kiselyov (politician) (born 1950), Russian politician, former Governor of Arkhangelsk Oblast
  - Nikolai Dmitrievich Kiselev (1802–1869), Russian diplomat and Privy Councilor
- Pavel Kiselyov (1788–1872), Russian general and politician
- Porfiriia Kiselyova (1855–1905), spiritual leader of the Ioannite sect of Russian Orthodox Church
- Sergey Kiselyov, several people:
  - Sergey Kiselyov (historian) (1905–1962), Soviet historian and archeologist
  - Sergey Semyonovich Kiselyov (1910–1943), Soviet army officer and Hero of the Soviet Union
  - Sergey Kiselyov (footballer) (born 1976), Russian professional footballer
- Tikhon Kiselyov (1917–1983), Soviet statesman and party figure
- Vladimir Kiselyov, Soviet shot put athlete
- Yelena Kiselyova (1878–1974), Russian painter
- Yevgeny Kiselyov (born 1956), Russian journalist
