= Joseph Chinard =

French sculptor (1756–1813)

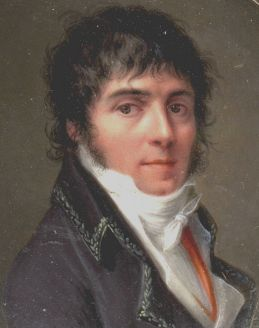
Joseph Chinard, miniature by Jean François Soiron

Joseph Chinard (Lyon, 12 February 1756 — Lyon 20 June 1813) was a French sculptor who worked in a Neoclassical style that was infused with naturalism and sentiment.

== Life ==
He received his early training in Lyon, as a painter, in the government-supported École Royale de Dessin, then worked with a local sculptor. His work at Lyon drew the attention of a patron who sent him to Rome, 1784–87. He sent back to Lyon copies of antiquities. In Rome he won a prize from the Accademia di San Luca, a signal honour for a non-Italian: his prize-winning sculpture, a terracotta Perseus and Andromeda remains in the collection of the Accademia.

He returned to Rome again in 1791, when his activities sometimes drew the attention of the authorities, especially given his espousal of Revolutionary ideas during the French Revolution; in 1791 he was interned in the Castel Sant'Angelo for two months, on the orders of the Pope, for an action that were viewed as subversive, the exhibition in terracotta of a model for the base of a candelabrum in which Apollo trampled underfoot Superstition. On his release in December 1792, he was expelled and returned to Dijon.

His marble Bust of Madame de Verninac was shown in plaster at the Salon of 1800 and in marble (illustrated) at the Salon of 1808. Chinard made only infrequent trips to Paris, dividing his time between Lyon and Italy. On one occasion in Paris he produced the bust of Mme Récamier (now at the J. Paul Getty Museum), which was reproduced in marble.

Chinard sculpted a terra cotta bust of Pierre-Pomponne-Amédée Pocholle, which was exhibited in the Exposition Universelle of 1878 at the Palais du Trocadéro, in the section of Portraits Nationaux (catalogue number 440). The town of Lyon commissioned Chinard to make the bust in appreciation for Pocholle's even-handed treatment of the town during his government service there in 1794. When Pocholle became sous-prefét of Neufchâtel-en-Bray in 1804, he took the bust with him, and then gave the bust to his sister, the widowed Mrs. Delile, when he went into exile in 1816. She in turn gave the bust to Mr. Mabire, who later donated it to the newly established museum of Neufchâtel-en-Bray in 1832. The Bulletin des Musées de France, 1er année, no. 11, novembre 1929, includes a photograph of the bust.

Much of his public sculpture in Lyon was lost during the Revolution. His intimate terracotta or marble family allegories adapted conventions of funeral monuments to present realistic allegories of family affection.

Interest in Chinard was revived with a retrospective of his sculpture at the Musée des Arts Décoratifs, Paris, in 1909–10.

Chinard's work may be seen in various museum collections, including those of the Louvre, the Musée des Beaux-Arts de Lyon, the Metropolitan Museum of Art and the National Gallery of Art, Washington

== Works ==
- Laocoön and His Sons - Museum of Fine Arts of Lyon
- Saints Augustine and Paul, Museum of Fine Arts, Boston
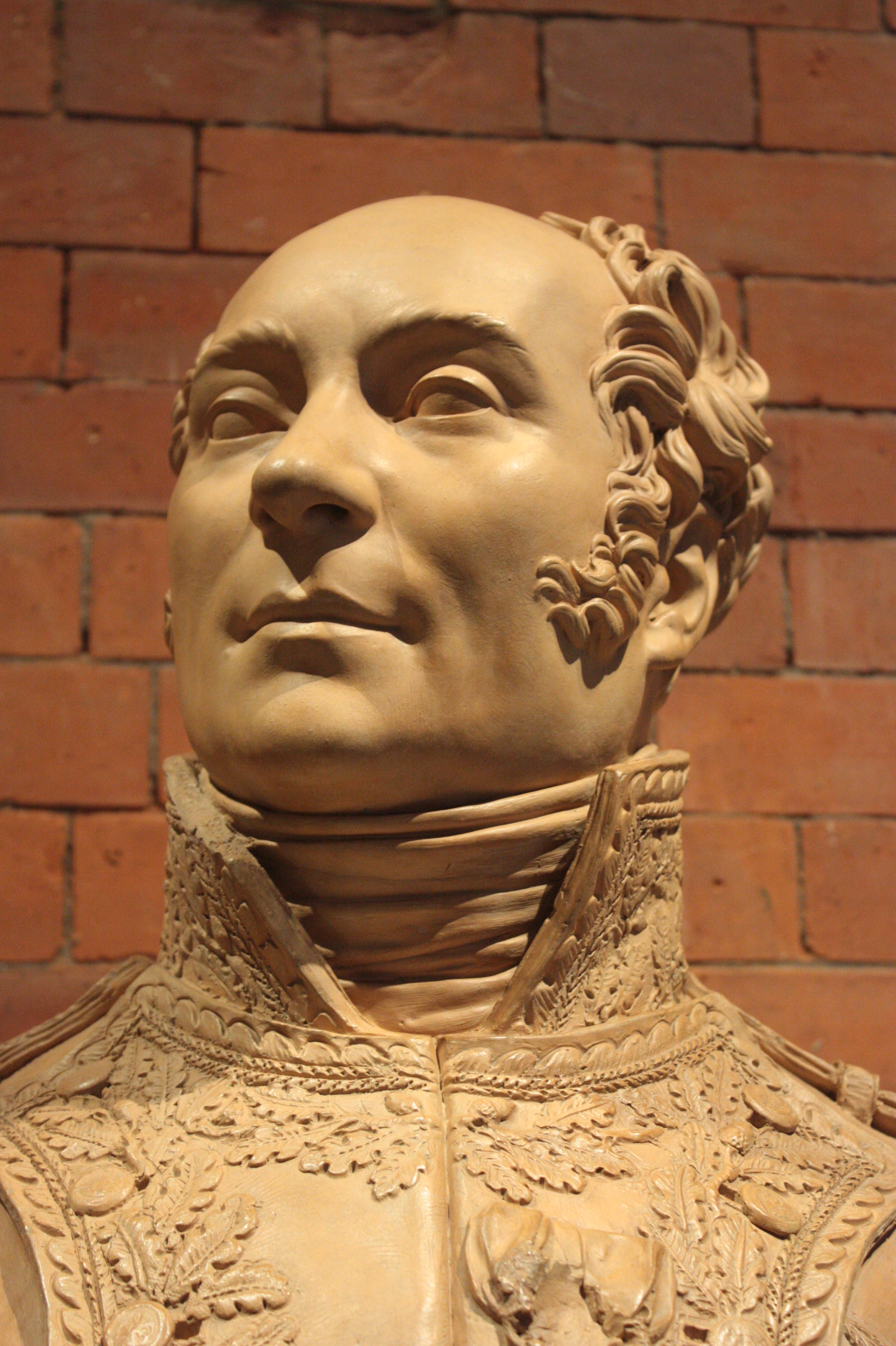
General Joseph Piston, 1812

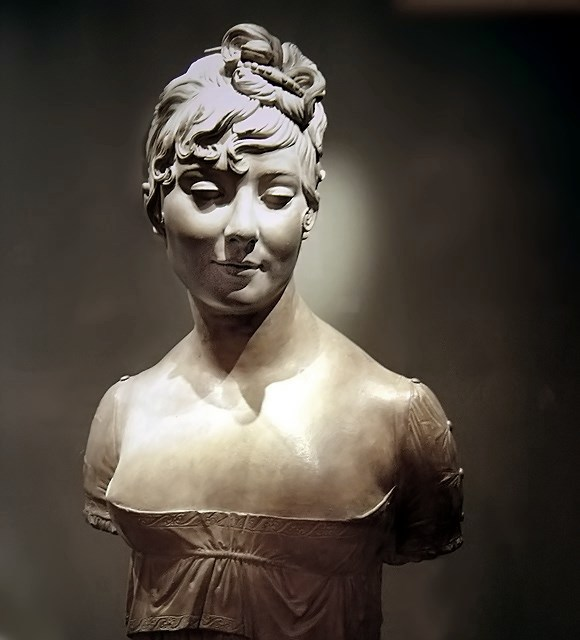
Unknown bust, 1802, Louvre

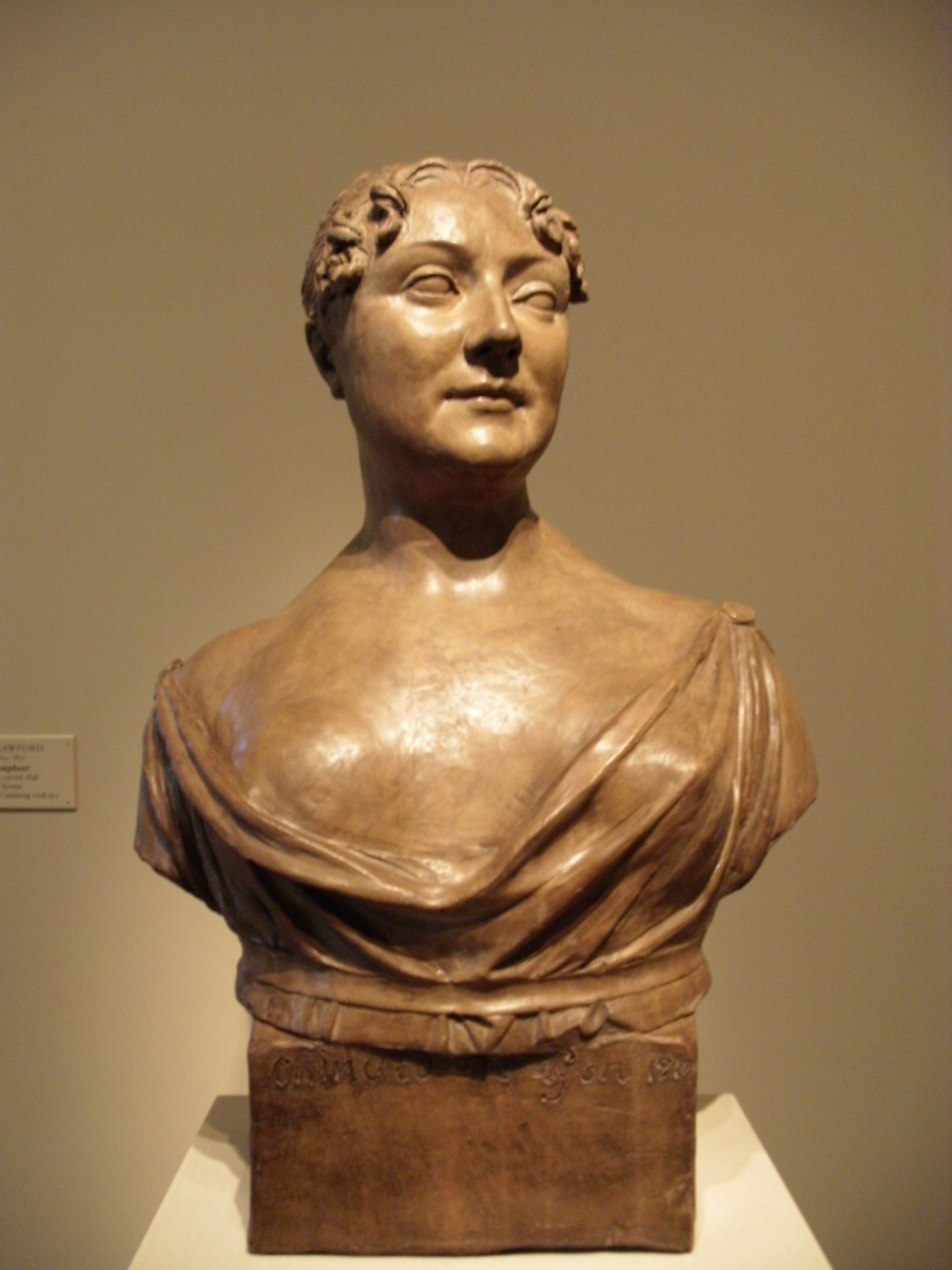
A Lady, 1816, National Gallery of Art, Washington D.C.

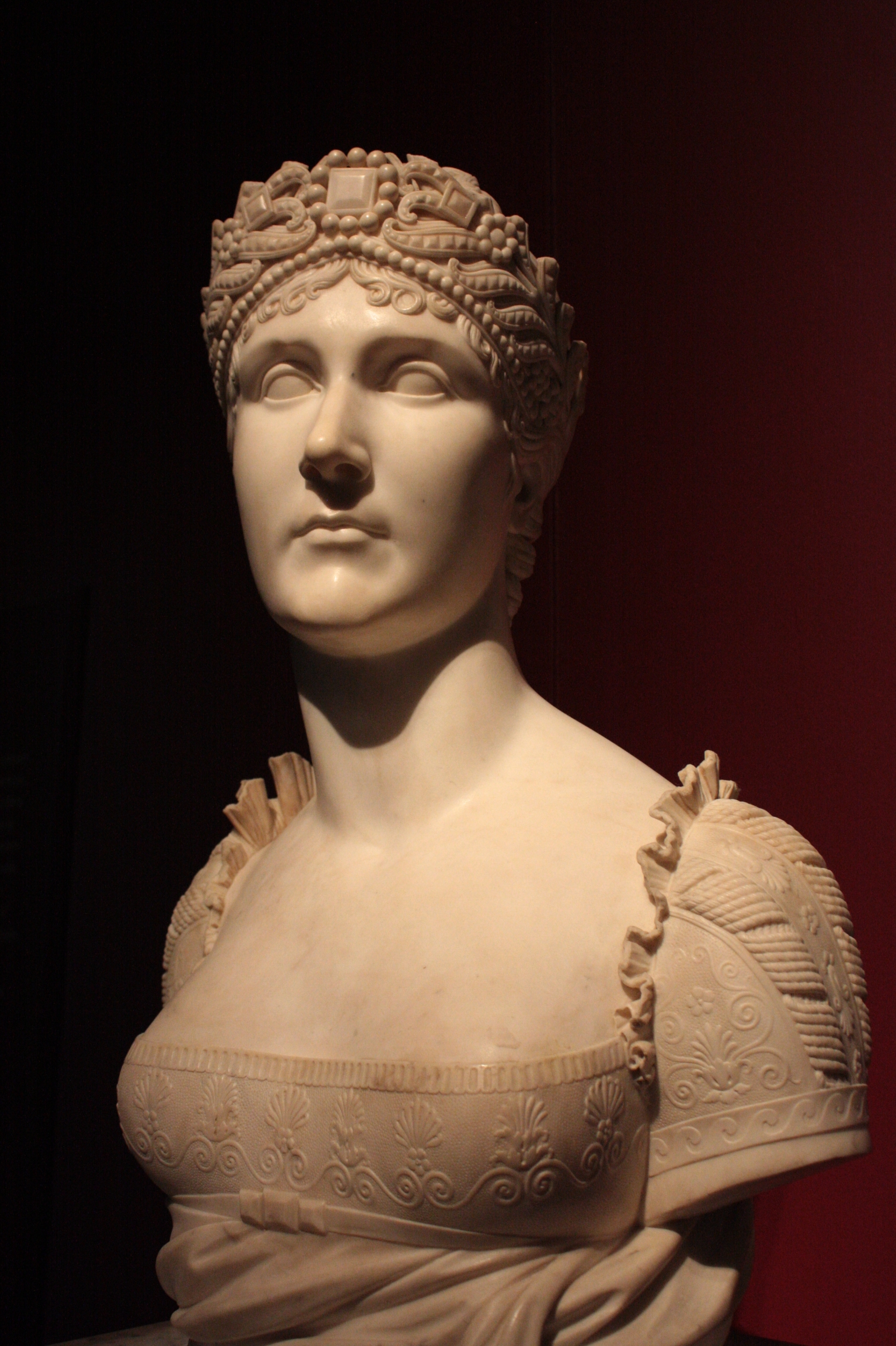
Empress Josephine, 1808, Victoria and Albert Museum

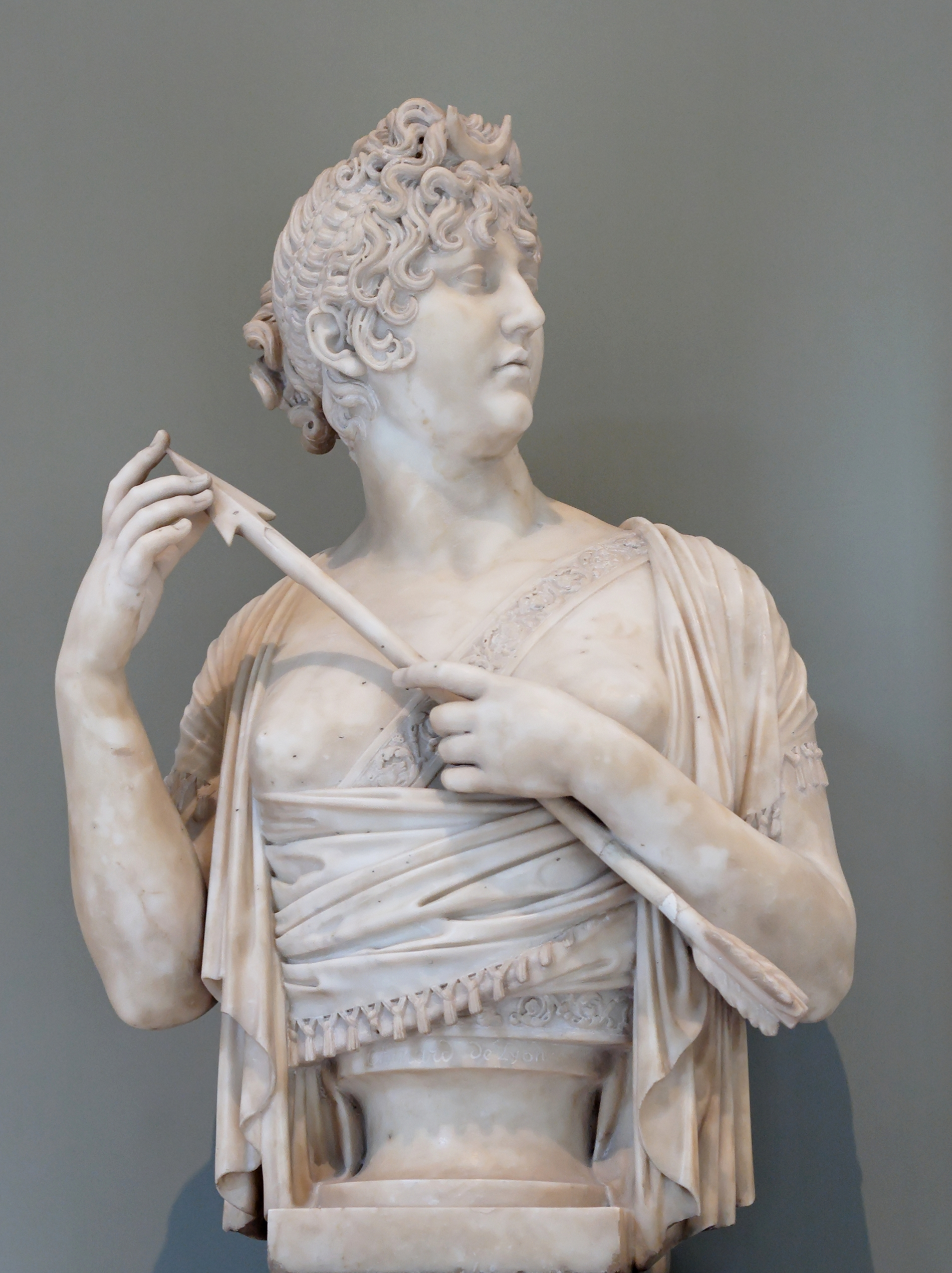
Mme. de Verninac as Diana the Huntress, 1800s, Louvre
