= Laocoön and His Sons (Chinard) =

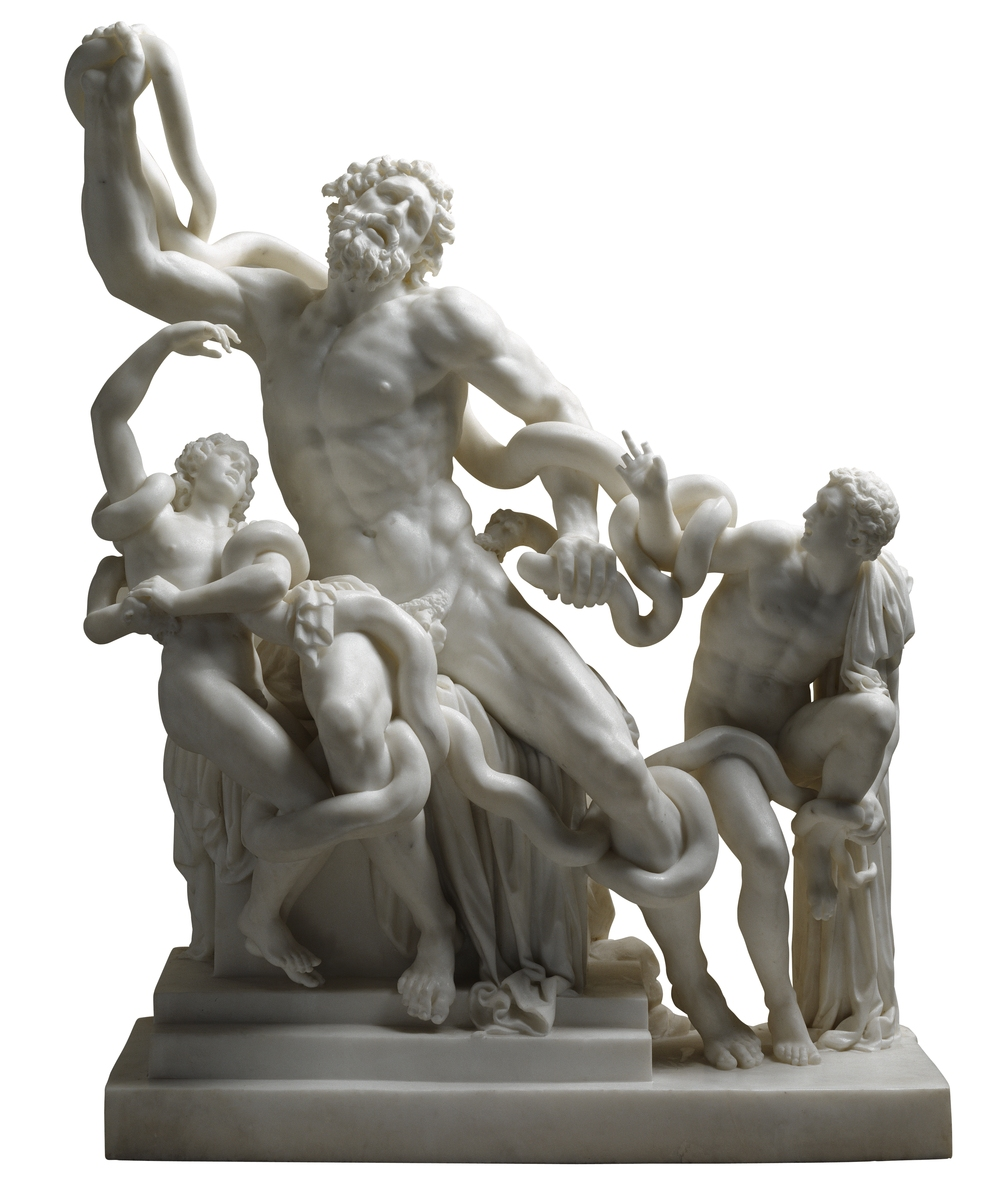

Laocoön and His Sons is a 0.83 m high marble sculpture by Joseph Chinard, now in the Museum of Fine Arts of Lyon. It is a reduced-scale copy of the ancient Laocoön and His Sons. He received the inspiration for it during a trip to Rome in the 1740s, where he observed the methods of Doccia porcelain.

== Sources ==
- Catalogue de l'exposition D'après l'Antique no 92, 16 octobre 2000 - 15 janvier 2001, Jean-Pierre Cuzin, Jean-René Gaborit, Alain Pasquier.
