= Alexander Kiselyov =

Alexander Kiselyov (alternatively spelled Kiselev) is the name of:

- Alexander Kiselyov (painter) (1838–1911), Russian landscape painter
- Alexander Kiselev (mathematician), 2012 Guggenheim Fellowships award recipient
- Alexander Kiselyov (businessman), CEO of Svyazinvest, Russia's largest telecommunications holding company

== See also ==
- Kiselyov
