= Yelena Kiselyova =

Russian painter

- Born: Yelena Andreyevna Kiselyova; 27 October [O.S. 15 October] 1878; Voronezh, Russian Empire
- Died: 8 July 1974 (aged 95); Belgrade, Yugoslavia
- Education: Lev Solovyov; Ilya Repin
- Alma mater: Bestuzhev Courses; Imperial Academy of Arts

Yelena Andreyevna Kiselyova (Russian: Елена Андреевна Киселёва; 27 October [O.S. 15 October] 1878 - 8 July 1974) was a Russian painter. She was one of the main exponents of the post-impressionist genre in Russia . She is known for her passion for portraits and the figure of women.

== Life ==
Kiselyova was born in Voronezh on 27 October 1878. She was the daughter of mathematician Andrey Kiselyov and Maria Eduardovna. Andrei Petrovich was a teacher at a Voronezh public educational institute. They opened a school for the poorest children on their Otrádnoye estate, which after the revolution was to become an orphanage. From 1922 the family lived in Leningrad.

Kiselyova received private drawing lessons from Mikhail Ponomarev. She would later study at the city drawing school under the instruction of Lev Solovyov. She later studied at the Mariinskaya Women's High School and managed to graduate with a gold medal, to enter the Bestuzhev courses in Saint Petersburg.

She decided to study mathematics, but in 1898 she decided to dedicate herself to the artistic world and studied at the Superior School of Art of the Imperial Academy of Arts. She would later study in the studio of Ilya Repin. Kiselyova was a favorite student, so in 1903 she entrusted her work together with Yevgeniya Maleshevskaya for a series of dioramas for the bicentennial of Saint Petersburg. In 1907, she studied in Paris.

After the October Revolution, she lived in Odessa. In February 1920, she emigrated to the Kingdom of Yugoslavia, where her husband got a job at the University of Belgrade. In 1926 they received Yugoslav citizenship.
