= Mounted Carabiniers (France) =

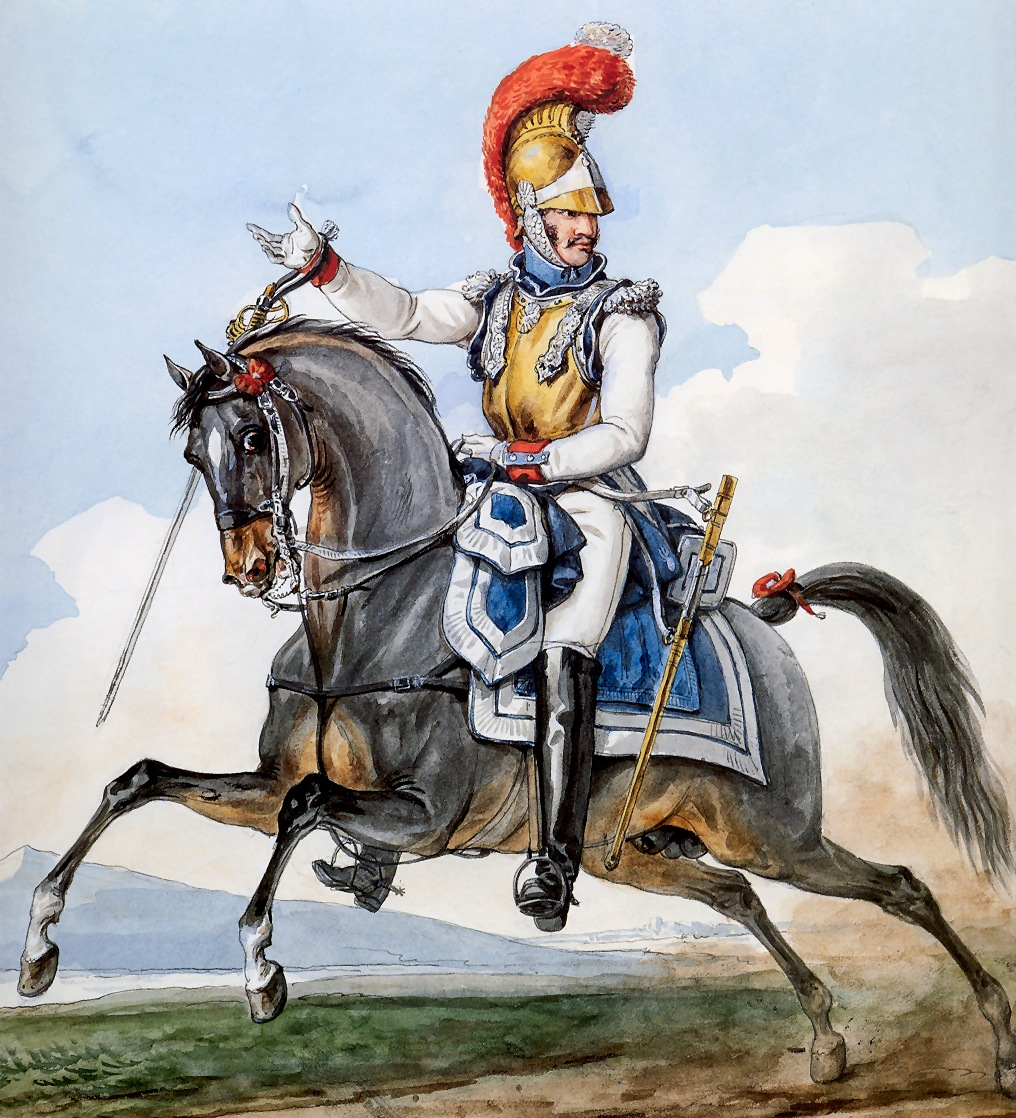
- A 1st Regiment of Carabiniers soldier in 1812
- Active: 1693–1871
- Country: France
- Branch: French Army
- Type: Heavy cavalry
- Role: Shock action
- Engagements: Nine Years' War; Seven Years' War; French Revolutionary Wars; Napoleonic Wars; Franco-Prussian War

Commanders
- Notable commanders: Jean-Louis-Brigitte Espagne; Joseph Piston; Jean-Marie Defrance; Amable-Guy Blancard

Mounted Carabiniers were a type of French cavalry unit. Their origins date back to the mid-16th century, when they were created as elite elements of the French light cavalry, armed with carbines but then gradually evolved towards semi-independent status during the 18th century. They only became independent units as late as 1788, when a two-regiment heavy cavalry corps was created. From the French Revolutionary Wars onwards, they were the senior heavy cavalry regiments in the French army, rose to prominence during the Napoleonic Wars and were disbanded in 1871, after the fall of the Second French Empire.

== Ancien Régime ==
The French carabiniers are first mentioned at the battle of Neerwinden in 1693 commanded by Prince de Conti. Although their original role was that of a mounted police similar to the Gendarmes, as combat troops they were first took the form of separate companies within each cavalry regiments on 29 October 1691 under Louis XIV. Only later was an independent regiment or cavalerie de reserve established in 1693 under the command of Duc du Maine. However at that time all French cavalry other than the gendarmes were called light cavalry, and their first name was Corps royal des carabiniers, organised by brigading of four squadrons commanded by a lieutenant-colonel.

The Corps was enlarged to ten squadrons by the start of the Seven Years' War. Their depot was in Strasbourg, where it remained for a century. On 13 May 1758, the Corps was renamed Royal carabiniers de monsieur le Comte de Provence. By 1762, the Corps was enlarged to five brigades of thirty squadrons, but was reduced to two regiments in 1788.

== Revolutionary and Napoleonic Wars ==
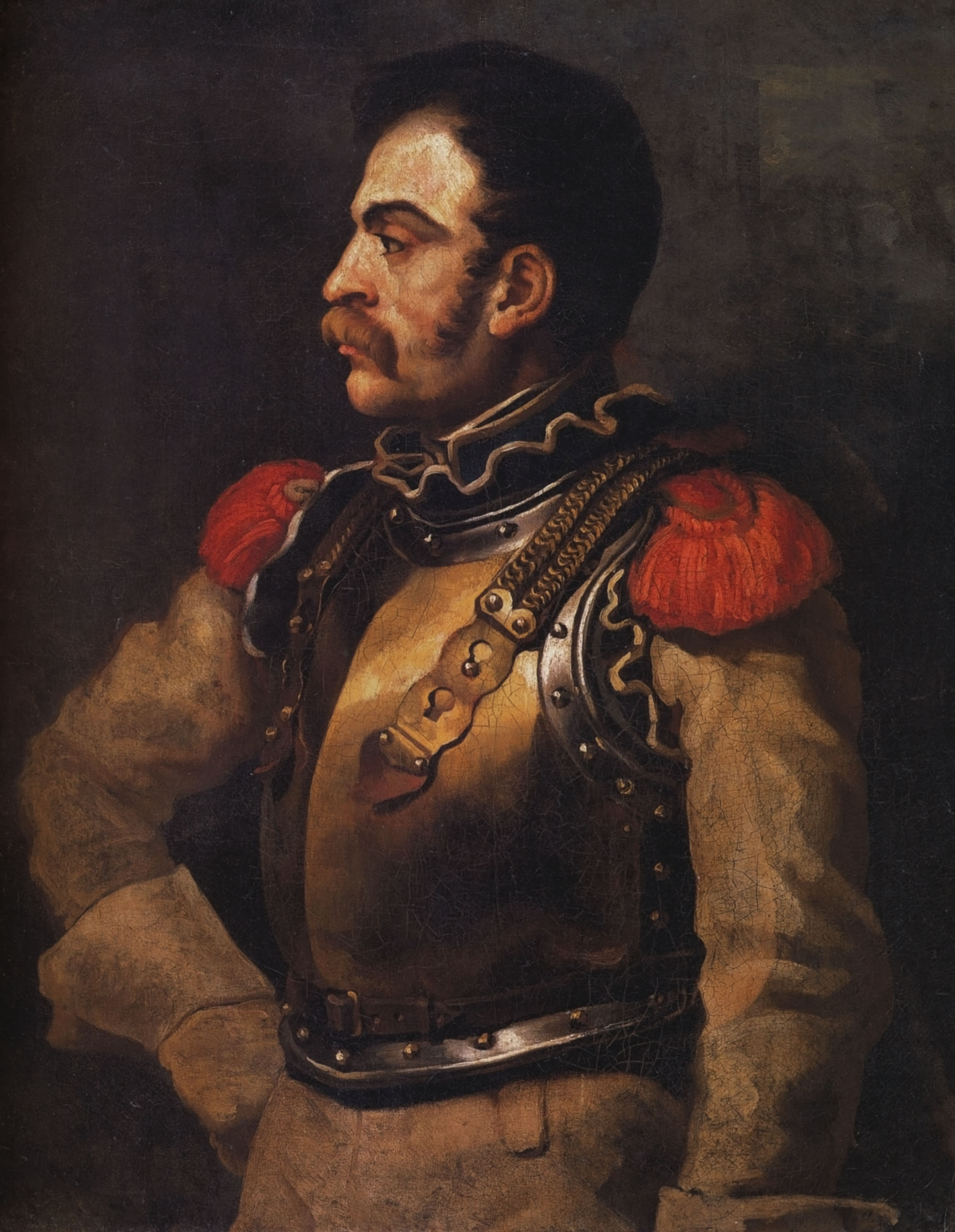
Portrait of a Carabinier-à-cheval by Théodore Géricault (c. 1812)

The 1st and 2nd Carabiniers-à-Cheval were created in 1788, as regiments of heavy cavalry. They participated with distinction in the French Revolutionary Wars and Napoleonic Wars. Their uniform was described by the Etat militaire de l'an X (1802): "National blue costume and scarlet lapels, blue collar, bearskin hat, yellow bandolier and belt, with white plait on the edges. Horse equipage: saddle à la française, blue cover with white plait on the edges, a grenade in the corners, the ornaments of the bridle stamped with a grenade." Before 1810, the Carabiniers-à-Cheval did not wear a cuirass.

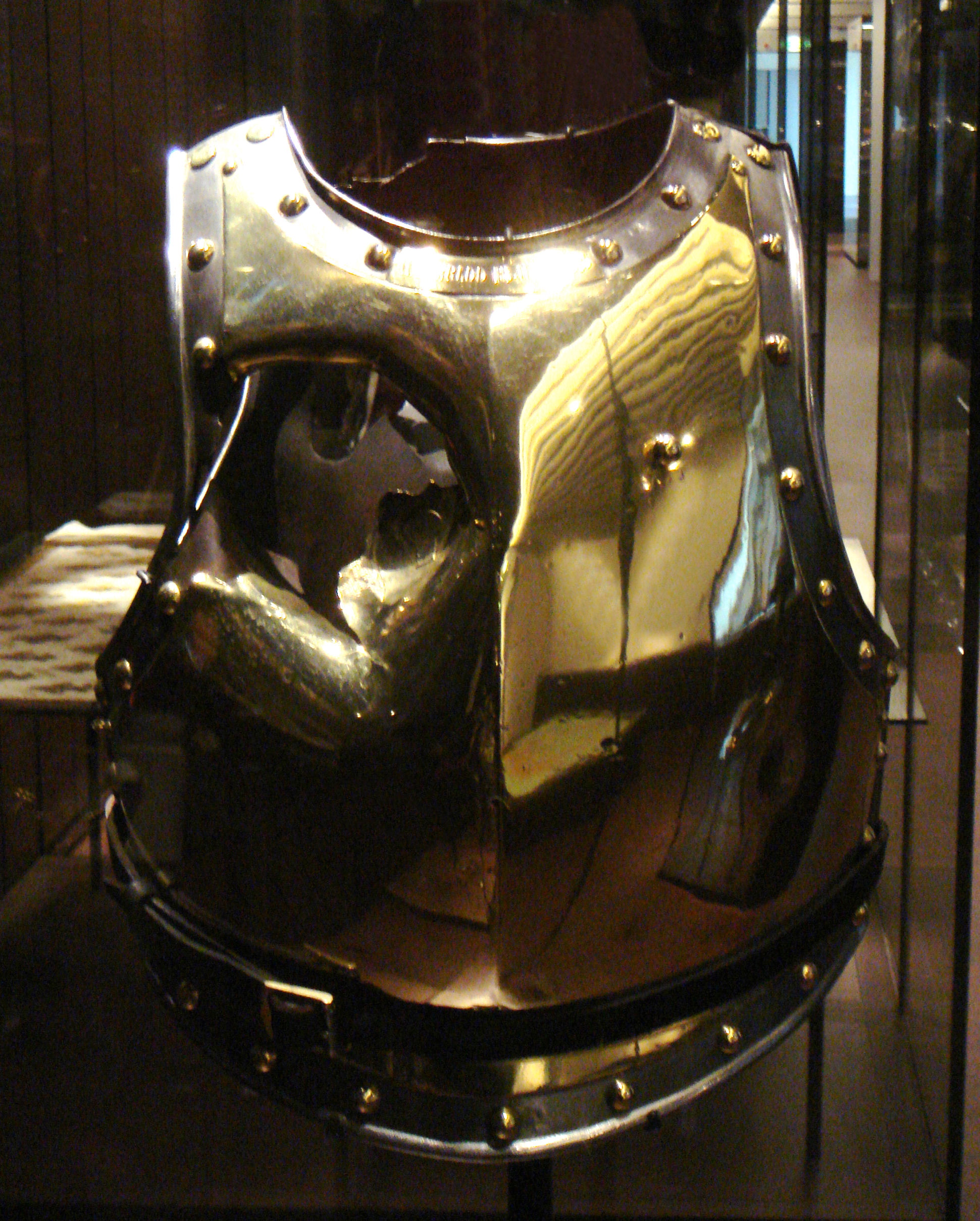
Carabinier-à-Cheval cuirass holed by a cannonball at Waterloo, belonging to Antoine Fauveau (Musée de l'Armée).

The decree of 24 December 1809 altered the uniform of the carabiniers: white costume, double steel cuirass (breastplate and backplate) covered with brass sheathing (copper for officers), helmet with a peak and which covered the back of the neck, with a golden-yellow copper crest decorated with a chenille made of scarlet bristle. Their armament included a carbine, a sabre (straight-bladed before c. 1811, then "à la Montmorency" – with a very slight curve) and a pair of pistols.

== 19th century ==
Carabiniers were again raised in the form of two regiments by 1824, with their distinctive style of helmet being temporarily adopted by the cuirassiers also. The Carabiniers were present in Paris in June 1848 for the creation of the French Second Republic when nine regiments were brought in to maintain peace, the first time in 200 years that carabiniers were again serving as military police. From 1852, during the Second French Empire, the Carabiniers were a part of the military but did not serve in the Crimean War. They saw service again in 1870 as a single regiment, but now as part of the Imperial Guard. Following the Franco-Prussian War the Carabiniers were amalgamated with the 11th Cuirassier Regiment on 4 February 1871.

The 1st-11th Cuirassier Regiment of the modern French Army can accordingly trace its origin, in part, to the 19th century Carabiniers. By coincidence the present day regiment is stationed in Carpiagne within Provence, once the domain of their former commander.

== Units ==
- 1e Régiment des Carabinier
- 2ème Régiment des Carabinier

== Uniform evolution ==
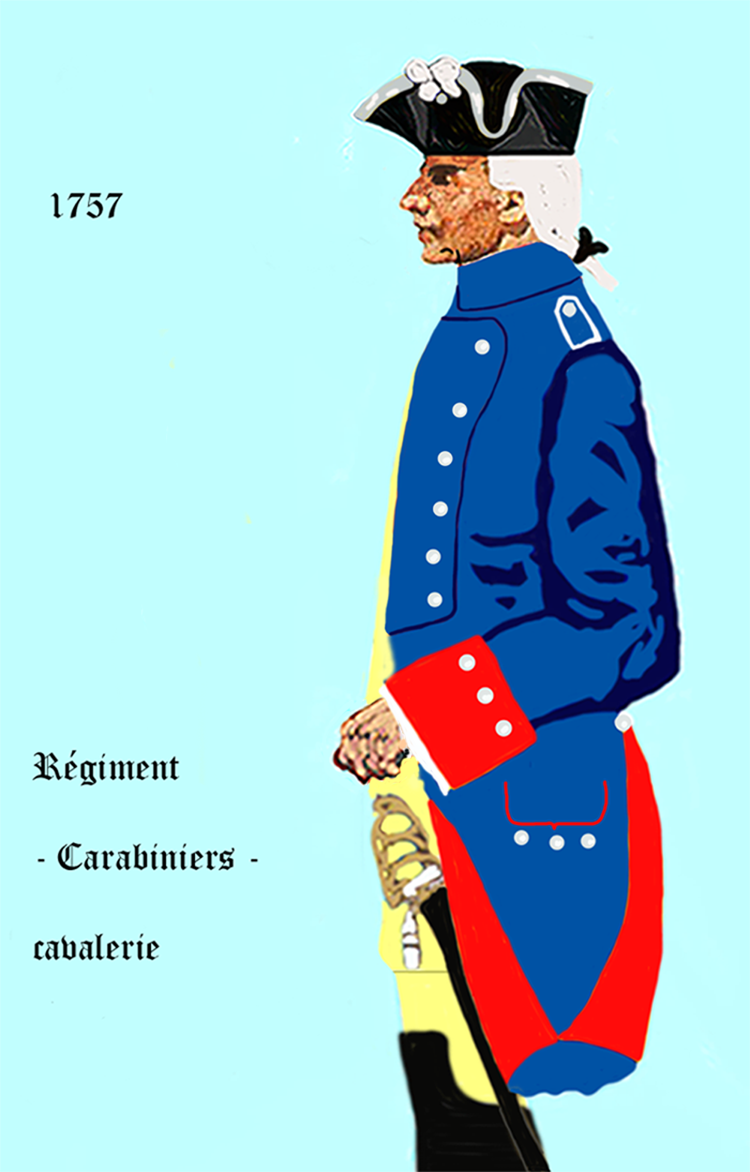
Uniform of the Regiment ″Carabiniers cavalerie″ as of 1757

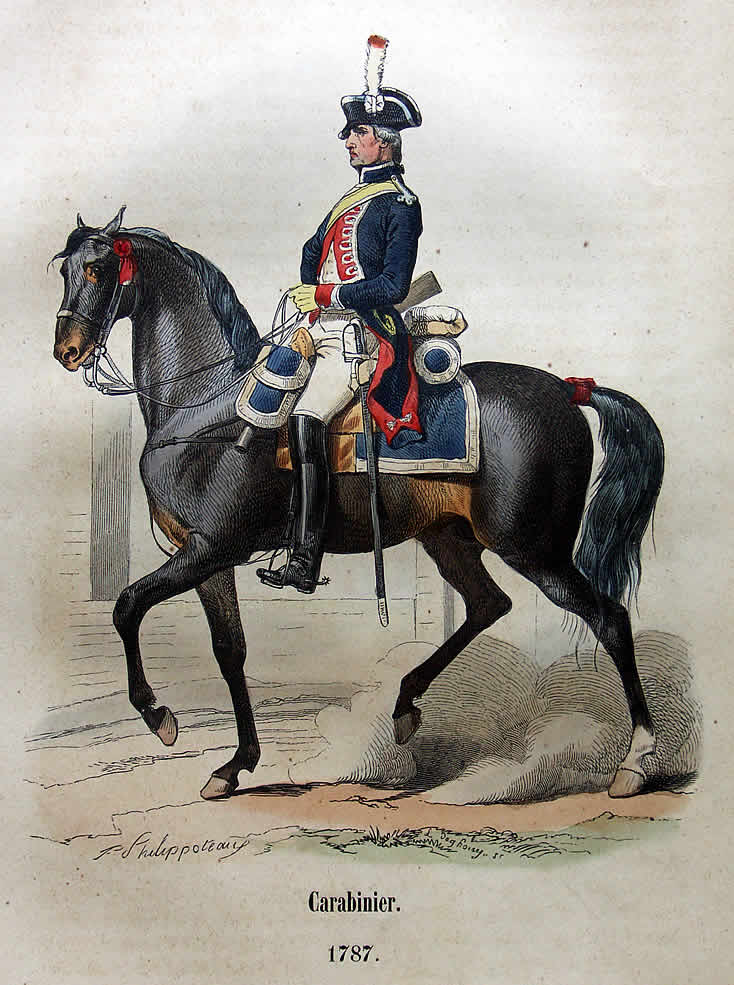
Pre-revolutionary Carabinier-à-cheval (1787).

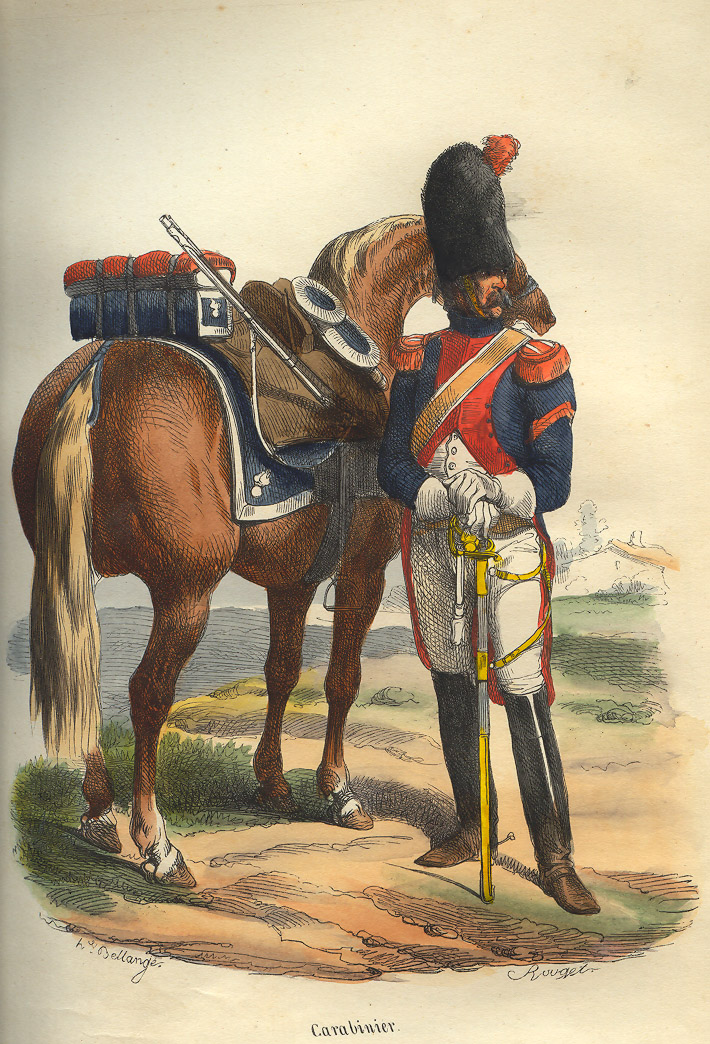
Trooper of the Carabiniers-à-cheval in pre-1809 uniform.

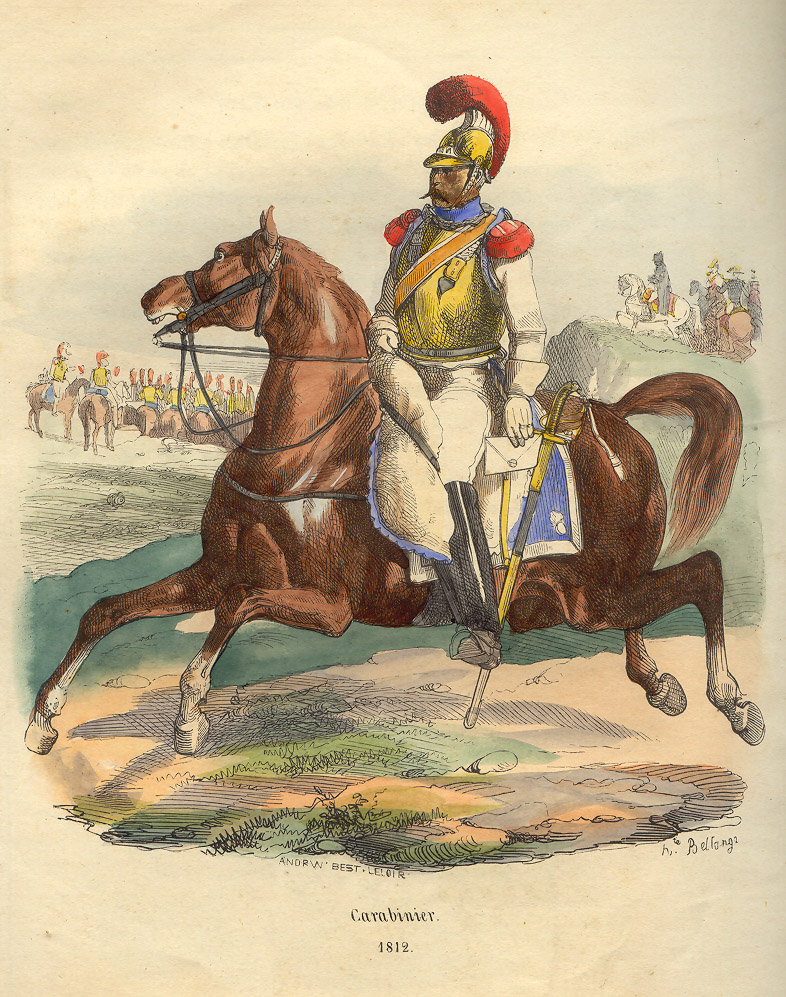
Trooper of the Carabiniers-à-cheval in post-1809 uniform

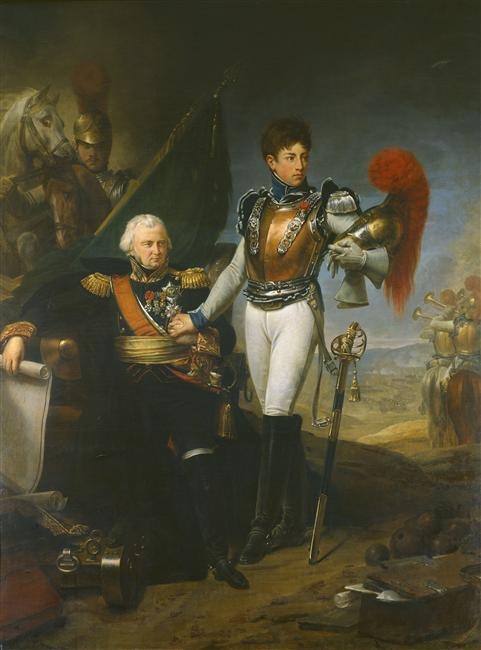
General Lariboisière and his son, an officer of the Carabinier-à-cheval who died during the battle of Borodino.

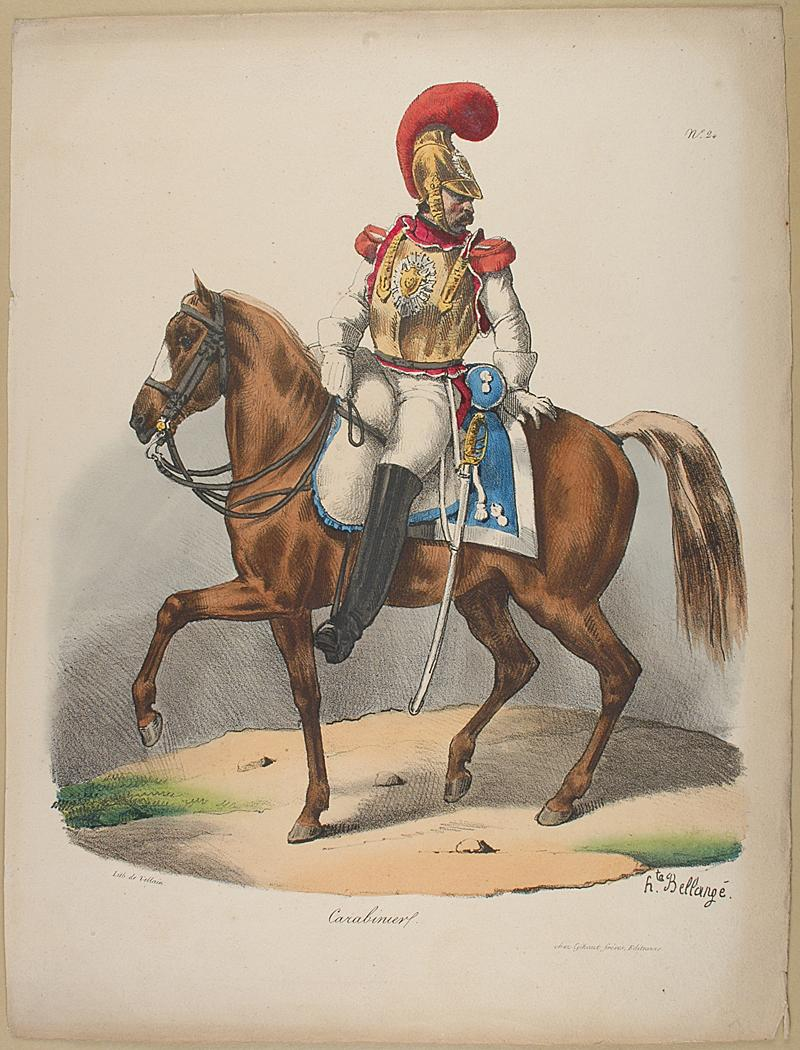
Carabiniers-à-Cheval, Bourbon Restauration, 1815–1830.

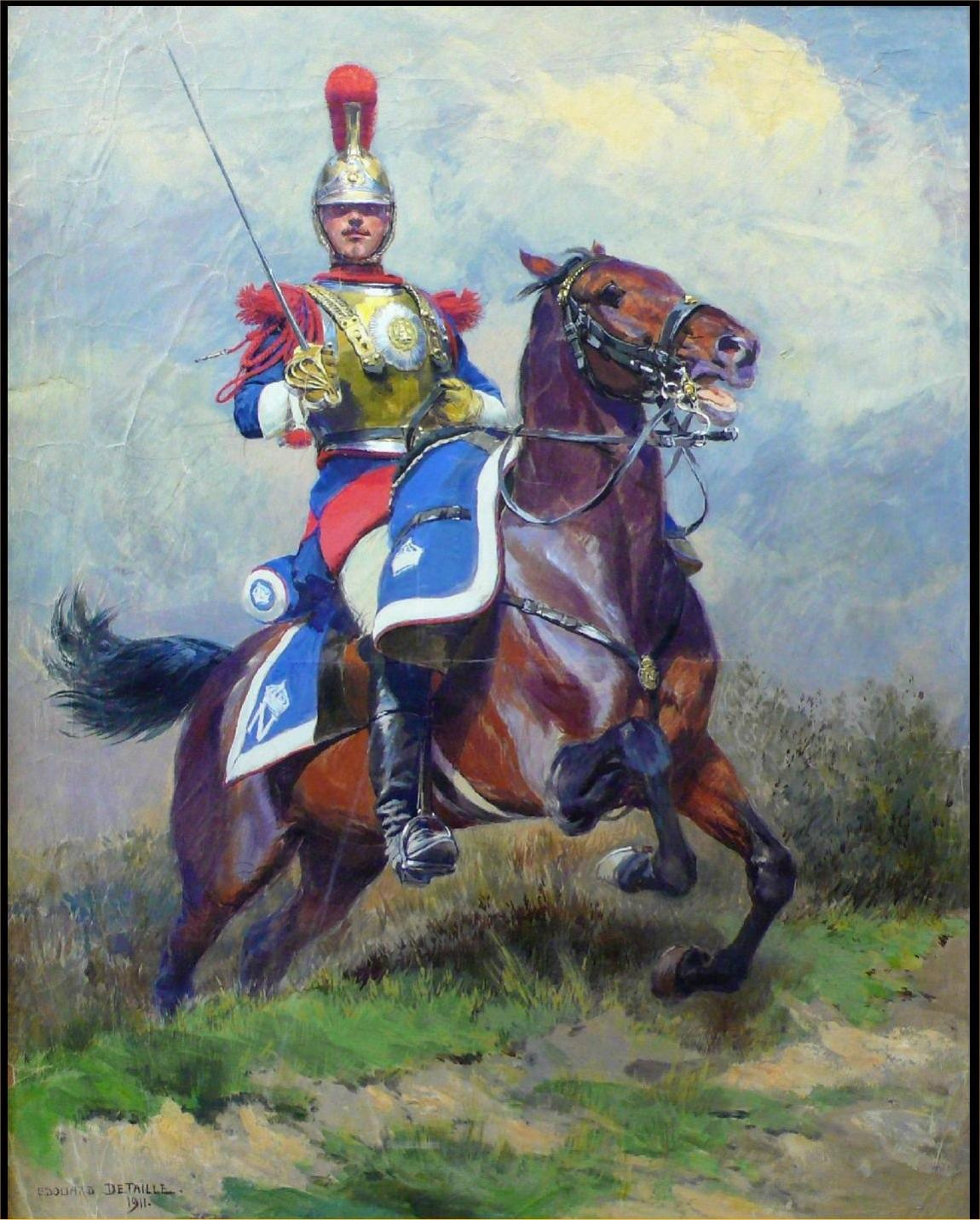
Carabiniers-à-Cheval, Second French Empire, 1852–1870.

== See also ==
- Uniform of the 1st squadron of the 1st regiment of Carabinier-à-cheval, in 1815, on "Les uniformes pendant la campagne des Cent Jours"
- Dragoon
