= Aleksei Kiselyov =

Aleksei Kiselyov may refer to:

- Aleksei Kiselyov (boxer) (1938–2005), Soviet Olympic boxer
- Aleksei Kiselyov (politician) (1879–1937), Russian Soviet politician
