= Andrey Kiselyov =

Russian and Soviet mathematician

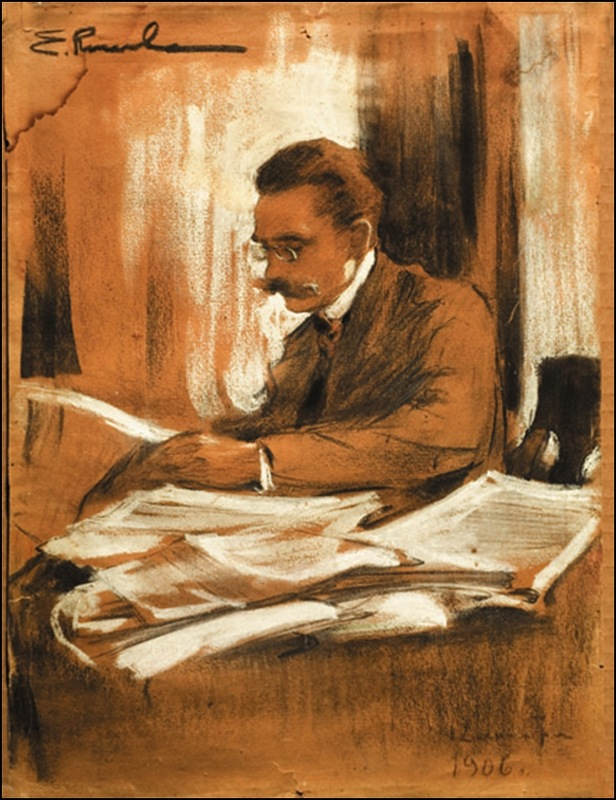
- Portrait by his daughter Yelena Kiselyova
- Born: Andrey Petrovich Kiselyov; December 12, 1852; Mtsensk, Oryol Governorate, Russian Empire
- Died: November 8, 1940 (aged 87); Leningrad, RSFSR, Soviet Union

Andrey Petrovich Kiselyov (Russian: Андрей Петрович Киселёв; December 12, 1852 – November 8, 1940) was a Russian and Soviet mathematician.

== Biography ==
Kiselyov attended the district school in Mtsensk and later enrolled at the Gymnasium in Oryol, the main city in the region. He graduated from the Gymnasium in 1871 with the gold medal and, in the same year, entered the Physics and Mathematics Faculty of St Petersburg University. In 1875, Kiselyov graduated from the university with a degree that allowed him to teach in a Gymnasium. He taught mathematics, mechanics, and drawing. It was at that time when he started writing his own textbooks.

Of the many textbooks he wrote, three became the staple of school mathematics texts in Russia for many years: Systematic Arithmetic Course for Secondary Schools (1884), Elementary Algebra (1888), and Elementary Geometry (1892-1893). These textbooks remained in use during the Soviet times. They were praised for clarity and good logical organization, despite having some logical gaps that were beyond the understanding of an ordinary student. Kiselyov himself suggested that the properties required of a good textbook were precision, simplicity, and conciseness. By the 1950s Kiselyov's Geometry was still in widespread use.

In the early 2000s these three titles were re-issued primarily to acquaint teachers of secondary schools with the style of mathematics education employed a century ago. Since then, these textbooks have seen an increased interest from teachers and students alike.
