= Joseph Piston =

French general

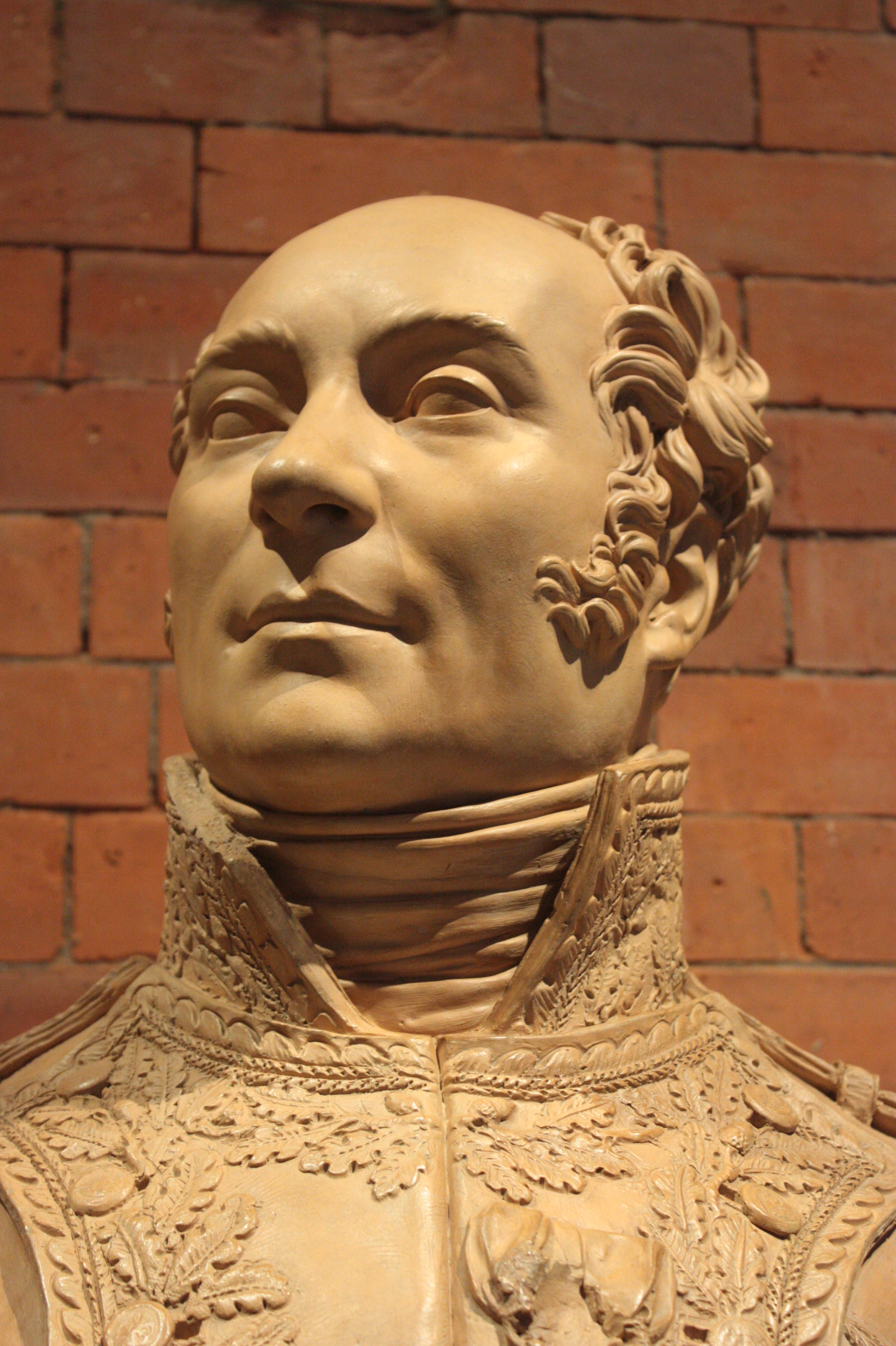
- Born: 1754; Lyon, France
- Died: 1831 (aged 76–77)
- Military career
- Allegiance: Kingdom of France (1791-1792), French First Republic, First French Empire
- Branch: Cavalry
- Rank: General of Division
- Commands: Carabiniers-à-Cheval
- Conflicts: French Revolutionary Wars; Napoleonic Wars
- Awards: Baron of the Empire

Joseph Piston (French pronunciation: [ʒozɛf pistɔ̃]; 1754–1831), baron of the Empire, was a French general who served during the French Revolutionary Wars and Napoleonic Wars.

== Life ==
The son of a merchant from Lyon, Piston joined the army and in 1793 rose to the rank of general of brigade, commanding cavalry in the French Revolutionary Army. General of division Étienne Marie Antoine Champion de Nansouty appreciated his skills as a cavalryman and Piston would serve in Nansouty's heavy cavalry division of the Cavalry Reserve during the War of the Third Coalition. In this capacity, Piston would charge at the battle of Austerlitz, leading his brigade of the 1st and 2nd Carabiniers-à-Cheval regiments (six squadrons, 386 men) against the Austrian and Russian cavalry. During the battle, his 1st regiment, under the command of Colonel Cochois lost 2 men killed and 24 wounded and his 2nd regiment, under Colonel Morin lost 17 men wounded. Piston was promoted to the rank of general of division shortly after the battle. He retired from active service in 1808.

== Sources ==
- Smith, Digby G. Great Cavalry Charges of the Napoleonic Wars, Greenhill Books London, ISBN 1-85367-541-5
- (in French) Tulard, Jean - "Dictionnaire Napoléon”; vol. 2, Librairie Arthème Fayard, 1999, ISBN 2-213-60485-1
